= Educational Psychology: A Century of Contributions =

Book edited by Barry Zimmerman and Dale Schunk

Educational Psychology: A Century of Contributions is a book edited by Barry Zimmerman and Dale Schunk in which each chapter presents a biography of an eminent scholar whose work has had a significant influence on the field of educational psychology. It is one of the few examples of published educational psychology historiography. The book was supported by the Educational Psychology Division of the American Psychological Association (Division 15). A committee of eight educational psychologists (David Berliner, Anita Woolfolk Hoy, Richard Mayer, Wilbert J. McKeachie, Michael Pressley, Richard Snow, Claire Ellen Weinstein, and Joanna Williams) selected the following biographical subjects.

- Albert Bandura 1925–2021
- Alfred Binet 1857–1911
- Benjamin Bloom 1913–1999
- Ann Brown 1943–1999
- Jerome Bruner 1915–2016
- Lee Cronbach 1916–2001
- John Dewey 1859–1952
- Nathaniel Gage 1917–2008
- Robert Gagné 1916–2002
- William James 1842–1910
- Maria Montessori 1870–1952
- Jean Piaget 1896–1980
- Herbert A. Simon 1916–2001
- Burrhus Frederic Skinner 1904–1990
- Charles Spearman 1863–1945
- Lewis Terman 1877–1956
- Edward L. Thorndike 1874–1949
- Lev Semenovich Vygotsky 1896–1934
