= Current Issues in Education =

- Discipline: Education
- Language: English
- Edited by: Ivonne Lujano Vilchis

Publication details
- History: 1998–present
- Publisher: Mary Lou Fulton Teachers College (United States)
- Frequency: Triannually
- Open access: Yes
- License: CC-BY-SA

Standard abbreviations
- ISO 4: Curr. Issues Educ.

Indexing
- ISSN: 1099-839X
- LCCN: sn98004512
- OCLC no.: 39224056

Links
- Journal homepage; Online access; Online archive

Current Issues in Education is a peer-reviewed open access academic journal sponsored by Arizona State University's Mary Lou Fulton Teachers College. The journal is run by graduate students and covers all aspects of education. The journal is abstracted and indexed in the Directory of Open Access Journals and ERIH PLUS.

== History ==
The journal was established in 1998 by faculty advisers David Berliner, Jim Middleton, and Gene V. Glass (Arizona State University) and editor-in-chief Leslie Poynor. It ceased operation at the close of 2006 and underwent reorganization in 2007. Faculty advisors Finbarr Sloane (University of Colorado Boulder) and Sarah Brem (Arizona State University) and then-newly appointed editors Lori Ellingford and Jeffrey Johnson restarted the journal in December 2008.

The journal went on publishing hiatus in 2017. From 2018 to 2019 the publishing platform was upgraded and new faculty advisors Leigh Graves Wolf (Arizona State University) and Josephine Marsh (Arizona State University) were appointed. Under the direction of student editor Neelakshi Tewari the journal relaunched in 2020 and has resumed publication.
