= Education Review =

Education Review/Resenhas Educativas/Reseñas Educativas
- Language: English, Spanish, Portuguese

Publication details
- History: 1994 to present
- Publisher: Mary Lou Fulton College for Teaching and Learning Innovation, Arizona State University (United States)
- Open access: Yes

Standard abbreviations
- ISO 4: Educ. Rev.

Indexing
- ISSN: 1094-5296

Links
- Journal homepage

Education Review (ISSN: 1094-5296) is an open-access academic journal publishing reviews of books in the field of education. It was established in 1998 by Gene V. Glass, Nicholas Burbules (University of Illinois at Urbana–Champaign), and Kate Corby (Michigan State University). The journal publishes peer-reviewed essay reviews and reviews of recent scholarly books. The journal publishes books written in English, Spanish, and Portuguese spanning a wide range of education scholarship and practice across the globe. In addition, the journal publishes "Acquired Wisdom", peer-reviewed autobiographical essays highlighting the intellectual development and pedagogical legacies of esteemed educational researchers. Education Review is a signatory to the Budapest Open Access Initiative.

The journal has been served by a succession of editors since its inception:

Editors for English

- Gene V. Glass Arizona State University (1998–2012, 2024– )
- Nicholas Burbules University of Illinois Urbana-Champaign (1998–2000)
- Kate Corby, Brief Reviews Michigan State University (1998–2005)
- Melissa Cast-Brede, Co-Editor University of Nebraska at Omaha (1998– )
- David J. Blacker University of Delaware (2012–2014)
- Gustavo Fishman Arizona State University (2015–2023)

Editors for Spanish and Portuguese

- Gustavo Fishman Arizona State University (1998– )
- Andréa Barbosa Gouveia, Associação Nacional de Pós-Graduação e Pesquisa em Educação, Brazil (2019–2023)
- Karine Morgan, Associação Nacional de Pós-Graduação e Pesquisa em Educação, Brazil (2020– )

Editors for "Acquired Wisdom"

- Sigmund Tobias New York University (2016–2018)
- J. D. Fletcher Institute for Defense Analyses (2016–2018)
- David C. Berliner Arizona State University (2016–2018)
- Stacey J. Lee University of Wisconsin-Madison (2023–2025)
- Phil Winne Simon Fraser University (2019–2023)
- Frederick Erickson University of California, Los Angeles (2019–2025)
- Sonia Nieto University of Massachusetts Amherst (2019–2022)
- Gene V. Glass Arizona State University (2024– )

Managing Editors

- Stephanie McBride-Schreiner Arizona State University (2015– ).
- Adriana Ester Reichert Palu, Associação Nacional de Pós-Graduação e Pesquisa em Educação, Brazil (2020 – )

Education Review/Reseñas Educativas is supported by the Scholarly Communications Group at the Mary Lou Fulton Teachers College at Arizona State University and the Associação Nacional de Pós-Graduação e Pesquisa em Educação. The journal was supported by the National Education Policy Center (https://nepc.colorado.edu) from 2010 until 2015 and from 2012 until 2014 by the College of Education and Human Services of the University of Delaware.

The journal is hosted by the Public Knowledge Project a non-profit research initiative that is focused on the importance of making the results of publicly funded research freely available through open access policies.
