= Lois Knowles =

Lois Knowles (1903–1990) was the first woman to become a full professor in the College of Education at the University of Missouri. Dr. Knowles advocated for more women in higher education and co-authored an innovative textbook at the time, Seeing Through Arithmetic.

== Biography ==
Knowles was born in 1903 in the Oklahoma Territory. Her father homesteaded, but unsuccessfully. The family moved to Clinton, Missouri, where Knowles graduated from Clinton High, in 1921. She attended the University of Missouri, and by 1931, had earned bachelor's and master's degrees there. In 1941, she earned her doctorate. Knowles became a teacher and worked in Clinton and Sedalia, Missouri and also at the Duluth, Minnesota State Teachers College. She returned to the University of Missouri in 1934.

Knowles worked for the College of Education at the University of Missouri for 37 years and was awarded the Distinguished Faculty Award in 1968. She retired from the university in 1971. She also taught for some time at the university lab school. At the University of Missouri, Knowles was an advocate for equality for women and was the first woman to become a full professor in the College of Education. She was also the first female faculty member in Kappa Delta Pi.

Knowles died on January 8, 1990. She is buried at Calvary Episcopal Church Cemetery in Columbia, Missouri. Knowles lives on through her Math Education Scholarship and Endowed Faculty Fellowship. A plaque celebrating the memory and accomplishments hangs in Townsend hall in the College of Education at the University of Missouri.
