= Kappa Delta Pi =

American honor society for education

- ΚΔΠ
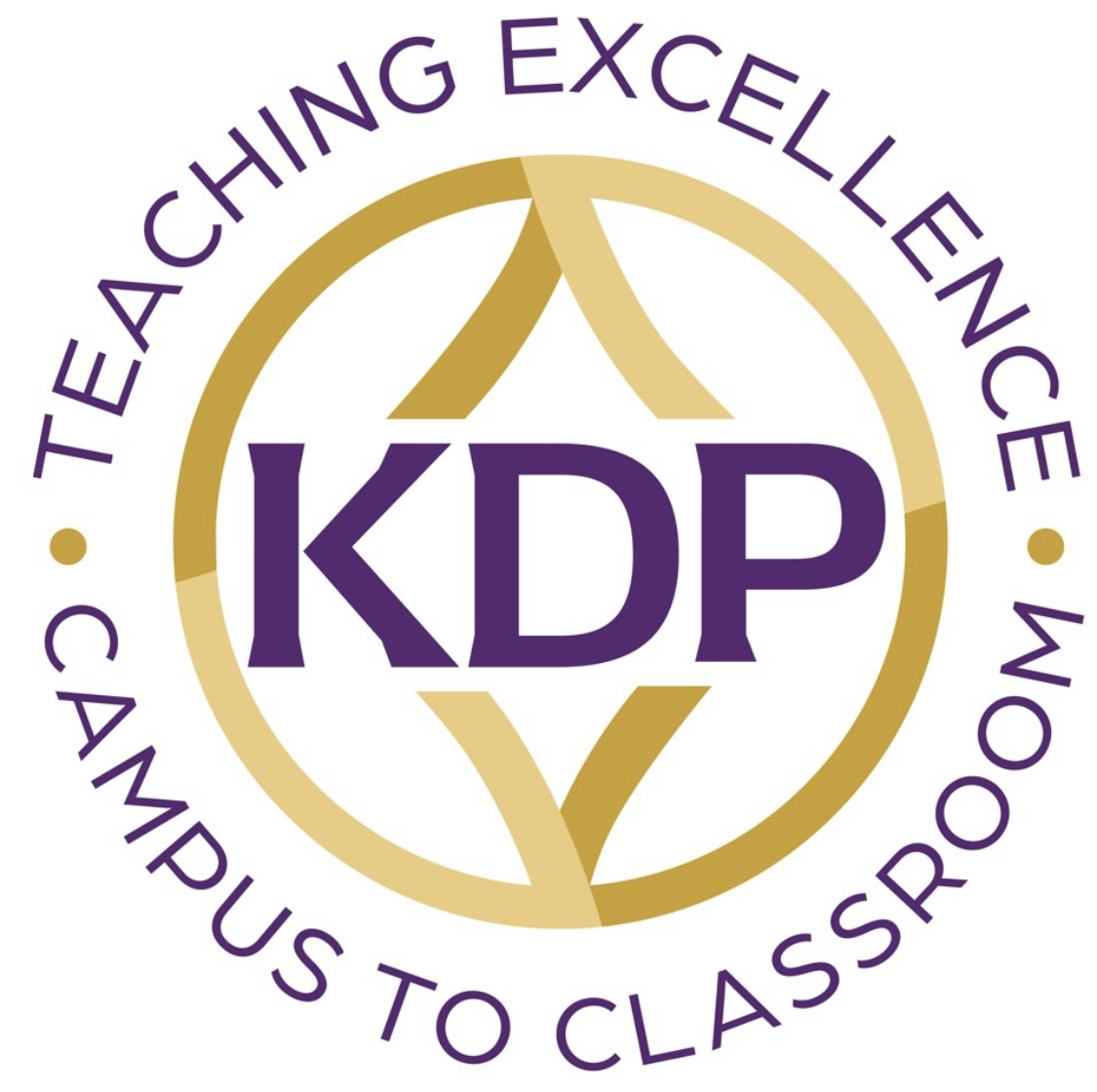
- Founded: March 8, 1911; 115 years ago University of Illinois
- Type: Honor
- Affiliation: Independent
- Former affiliation: ACHS
- Status: Active
- Emphasis: Education
- Scope: International
- Motto: "Knowledge. Duty. Power."
- Pillars: Community, Belonging, Leadership, Celebration
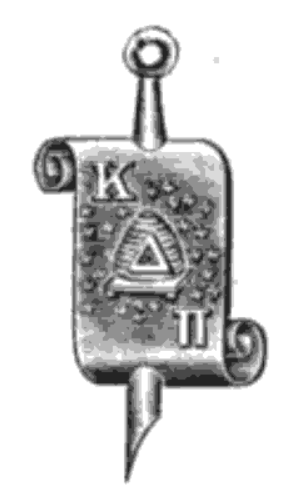
- Member badge
- Colors: Purple and Gold
- Flower: Violet
- Publication: The Educational Forum
- Chapters: 543 active
- Members: 20,000+ active 1,200,000 lifetime
- Headquarters: PO Box 681008; Indianapolis, Indiana 46268; United States
- Website: www.kdp.org

Kappa Delta Pi Honor Society in Education (ΚΔΠ or KDP) is an American honor society for education. It was formed in 1911 at the University of Illinois Urbana-Champaign as one of the first discipline-specific honor societies.

== History ==
Kappa Delta Pi grew out of the Illinois Education Club, founded by Dr. William Bagley at the University of Illinois in 1909. In May 1909, the club affiliated with Pi Kappa Mu, with plans on becoming a chapter. However, when Pi Kappa Mu began plans to merge with Phi Delta Kappa (PDK International), the Illinois Education Club withdrew its merger application as this meant that it would have to give up its coeducational status.

Instead, Bagley and the club's members formed the first chapter of Kappa Delta Pi, a coeducational national honorary educational fraternity. Kappa Delta Pi was formed as an educational fraternity that would provide a fellowship for education students and promote excellence in education. Alpha chapter was installed at the University of Illinois on March 8, 1911. The fraternity was incorporated with the State of Illinois on June 8, 1911.

A second chapter, Beta, was established at the University of Colorado in 1912. This was followed by Gamma chapter at the University of Oklahoma in 1915 and Delta at the University of Texas in 1916.

Its Laureate chapter was established in February 1924 to honor people who had made outstanding contributions to the development of professional education, similar to the National Academy of Science of the American Academy of Arts and Letters. John Dewey was inducted as the first member of the society's Laureate chapter.

By 1930, Kappa Delta Pi had chartered 62 chapters. In 1932, it changed from being a "fraternity" to a "society". The society's publication, The Educational Forum, was first published in 1936.

By 1963, the society had initiated 177,782 members and had 294 active chapters, 12 inactive chapters, and 16 alumni chapters. Kappa Delta Pi was a member of the Association of College Honor Societies from 1974 to 2008.

As of 2025, Kappa Delta Pi has more than 20,000 active members and more than one million initiates.

== Symbols ==
The name Kappa Delta Pi was selected from its motto "Knowledge, Duty, Power". The society's core values or pillars are Community, Belonging, Leadership, and Celebration. Its colors are purple and gold. Its flower is the violet.

Kappa Delta Pi's insignia is a gold key that is shaped like a scroll, pierced by a stylus, and bears the Greek letters "ΚΔΠ", with the letter "Δ" placed on top of a beehive. The scroll represents ancient scrolls of papyrus, the earliest documents of learning. The stylus symbolizes the first tool used to make letters and symbols, and the beehive represents toil. The insignia was produced as a key for men and a pin for women.

== Membership ==
Membership is open only to the top twenty percent of those entering the education field. In addition, undergraduates must have a 3.0 GPA and graduate students a 3.50 GPA. Membership for active professionals varies.

The society's Laureate Chapter is limited to sixty living members at any time.

== Activities ==
Kappa Delta Pi holds annual regional meetings and a biennial convocation where it conducts organizational business. The society also sponsors an awards program and national service projects.The society holds annual regional meetings and a biennial convocation where it conducts organizational business and provides professional development opportunities.

Kappa Delta Pi published the scholarly journal The Educational Forum and the weekly online weekly The Teacher Advocate. It also published the peer-reviewed The Kappa Delta Pi Record from 1964 to 2023. It also produces The Rooted Teacher Podcast.

The society's educational foundation and local chapters distribute multiple scholarships to members. Local chapters provide opportunities for networking, leadership training, community service, and professional development. Members can also participate in professional development through the Kappa Delta Pi website.

== Governance ==
Kappa Delta Pi is led by a national board of directors, drawn from the society's three standing committees. The society's national office in Indianapolis, Indiana.

== Chapters ==
As of 2025, Kappa Delta Pi has chartered more than 860 chapters, with 543 active collegiate chapters and four active professional or alumni chapters.

== Notable people ==
=== Notable members ===
- Merry Ann Thompson Wright, president general of the Daughters of the American Revolution
- Ruth Westheimer, professor, sex therapist and talk show host.

=== Laureates ===
Since 1924, 293 eminent educators have been named to Kappa Delta Pi's Laureate chapter.

- Grace Abbott (1936), social worker and director of the United States Children's Bureau
- Arthur S. Adams (1959), president of the University of New Hampshire
- Jane Addams (1932), settlement activist, reformer, social worker, and sociologist
- John Adams (1926), education scholar who was rector of Campbeltown Grammar School, rector of the Free Church Training College, and principal of the new London Day Training College
- Mortimer J. Adler (1992), philosopher who taught at Columbia University and the University of Chicago; encyclopedist who served as chairman of the Encyclopædia Britannica board of editors
- Edwin Alderman (1926), president of the University of Virginia
- Florence E. Allen (1944), Associate Justice of the Ohio Supreme Court and senior and chief judge of the United States Court of Appeals for the Sixth CircuitJames Rowland Angell (1933), psychologist and 16th President of Yale University
- Michael Apple (2011), educational theorist and professor emeritus of Curriculum and Instruction and Educational Policy Studies at the University of Wisconsin–Madison School of Education
- Frank Aydelotte (1953), president of Swarthmore College
- Bill Ayers (2000), co-founded the militant organization the Weather Underground; professor in the College of Education at the University of Illinois at Chicago
- William Bagley (1928) director of the School of Education at the University of Illinois and professor of education at Teachers College, Columbia University
- Liberty Hyde Bailey (1945), horticulturist, reformer of rural life, and cofounder of the American Society for Horticultural Science
- Stephen Ball (2015), sociologist and former Karl Mannheim Professor of Sociology of Education at the Institute of Education of University College London
- Harold R. W. Benjamin (1949), educator and writer
- David Berliner (1997), professor and dean of the Mary Lou Fulton Institute and Graduate School of Education
- Martha Berry (1941), founder of Berry College
- Benjamin Bloom (1984), educational psychologist
- Boyd Henry Bode (1936), professor at the University of Illinois at Urbana-Champaign and Ohio State University known for his work on philosophy of education
- Derek Bok (1997), president of Harvard University and Dean of Harvard Law School
- Ernest L. Boyer (1982), United States Commissioner of Education, chancellor of the State University of New York, and president of the Carnegie Foundation for the Advancement of Teaching
- John Brademas (1990), Majority Whip of the United States House of Representative and chairman of the board of the Federal Reserve Bank of New York
- Theodore Brameld (1972), philosopher and educator who supported the educational philosophy of social reconstructionism
- Harry Broudy (1968), professor of the philosophy of education University of Illinois at Urbana-Champaign
- George Washington Carver (1942), botanist and professor at the Tuskegee Institute who promoted alternative crops to cotton and methods to prevent soil depletion
- James B. Conant (1942) chemist
- John Dewey (1925) philosopher, psychologist, and educational reformer
- Albert Einstein (1950), theoretical physicist known for developing the theory of relativity
- J. William Fulbright (1956) United States Senator and U.S. House of Representatives
- Howard Gardner (1961) developmental psychologist
- Henry A. Giroux (1997) scholar and cultural critic
- Maxine Greene (1988), philosopher
- Robert Maynard Hutchins (1946), philosopher
- William Heard Kilpatrick (1926), pedagogue
- Alfie Kohn (2003), author and lecturer
- Jonathan Kozol (1997), activist and educator
- Margaret Mead (1962), cultural anthropologist, author, and speaker
- Nel Noddings (1994), feminist, philosopher, and educator
- Jean Piaget (1974), psychologist known for his work on child development
- Eleanor Roosevelt (1949), diplomat, activist, and First Lady of the United States
