= Mary Lou Fulton Institute and Graduate School of Education =

Former Arizona State University department

Coordinates: 33.43°N 111.93°W

The Mary Lou Fulton Institute and Graduate School of Education (known as FIGSE) at Arizona State University was established in 1954. It disestablished in 2010 by Provost Elizabeth Capaldi amidst strong objections from faculty, students, and relevant professional organizations. FIGSE is sometimes confused with ASU's Mary Lou Fulton Teachers College, which was renamed from the regional teaching-intensive West campus College of Teacher Education and Leadership (CTEL) at the same time the historic FIGSE was disestablished.

== History ==
Arizona State University was established in 1885 as the Territorial Normal School at Tempe in the Arizona Territory. The Normal School was charged with providing "instruction of persons, both male and female, in the art of teaching, and in all the various branches that pertain to a good common school education; also, to give instruction in the mechanical arts and in husbandry and agricultural chemistry, in the fundamental law of the United States, and in what regards the rights and duties of citizens." An effort by the alumni association changed the name of the institution to Tempe State Teachers College in 1925, and offered its first graduate degree, the Masters in Education, in 1937. Although courses were offered in other academic and professional disciplines, the school remained fundamentally a teachers college until 1945 when it was renamed Arizona State College.

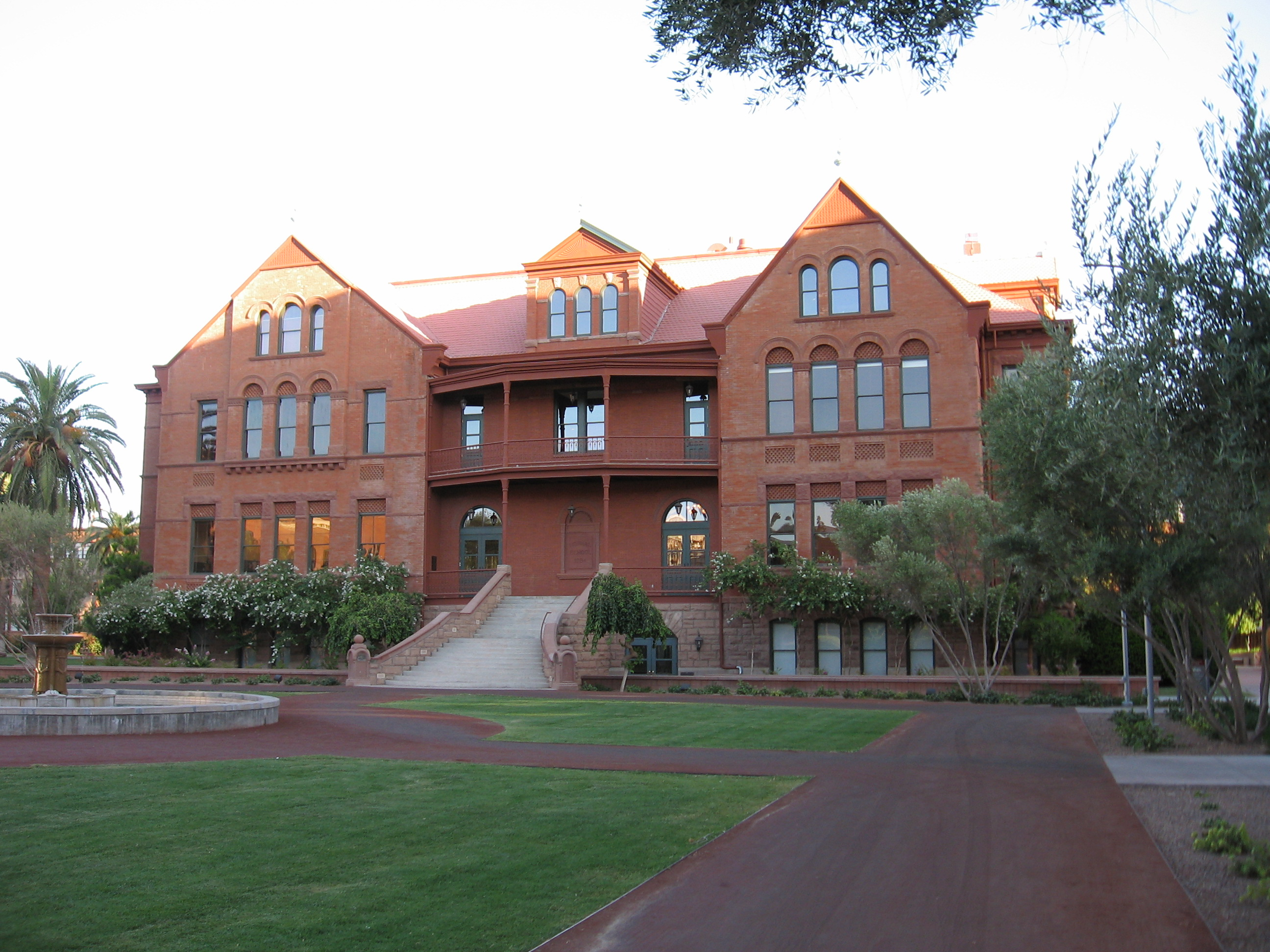
Territorial Normal School at Tempe, now ASU's Old Main

In 1954, the Arizona Board of Regents established four colleges within the institution: Liberal Arts, Education, Applied Arts and Sciences, and Business and Public Administration. Under the leadership of ASU President Grady Gammage, deans were appointed to oversee the administration of each new college.

Guy D. McGrath was appointed as the founding dean of ASU's College of Education, serving from 1954 to 1968. The college remained focused on teacher preparation until the mid-1980s, when Dean Gladys Styles Johnston, as part of the institution's efforts to achieve Carnegie's Research I status, recruited and appointed some of the nation's top education scholars, including Thomas Barone, David Berliner, Gene V Glass, and Mary Lee Smith. Currently, Barone, Berliner, Glass and Smith are emeritus education professors at ASU.

David C. Berliner was appointed as dean in 1997 and began a massive effort to hire new faculty. Berliner recruited Gene V Glass to serve as his associate dean for research and Gale Hackett as his associate dean for academic programs and personnel. Berliner and Glass, both former presidents of the American Educational Research Association (AERA), successfully leveraged their high visibility as education researchers to build the faculty of the College of Education. By the end of his tenure as dean, Berliner had been responsible for hiring approximately 25% of the college faculty, primarily exceptional junior scholars. Berliner and Glass were outspoken critics of the state's education policies; by taking their criticisms and concerns to the public, they created some irritation among state lawmakers and especially the state superintendent of public instruction, Lisa Graham Keegan. Berliner hired a number of progressive faculty who believed in public advocacy, further aggravating lawmakers and future superintendents, such as conservative Tom Horne.

Eugene Garcia was recruited to serve as the college's next dean in 2002, having just finished a successful run as the dean of UC Berkeley's Graduate School of Education. Garcia continued to build the college's national ranking and status with the addition of new faculty talent, increased external research funding, and increased faculty and student diversity. In 2003, Garcia was given the additional role of Vice President for University-School Partnerships in which he coordinated university-wide K-12 education efforts. Under Garcia's leadership, the College of Education obtained a generous $50 million endowment from Mary Lou Fulton, an ASU College of Education alumna and successful Arizona businesswoman. In 2006. Garcia continued the college's engagement in state policy debates, and also worked within the state's education leadership to improve policy decisions. He was appointed by Governor Janet Napolitano to serve on the state's ELL Task Force, a working group charged with implementing new state law regarding the education of English language learners. Garcia maintained his position as a university vice president after he stepped down from the deanship in 2006.

George Hynd was appointed as dean and senior vice provost for education and innovation in January, 2008, serving for two years. The economic downturn of that year resulted in large budget reductions for the university. In response, the university reorganized several units, including education. The name of the Mary Lou Fulton College of Education was changed to the Mary Lou Fulton Institute and Graduate School of Education (FIGSE), with a new mission to focus exclusively on research and graduate education programs. All undergraduate teacher education programs across the various campuses of the university were consolidated under the College of Teacher Education and Leadership (CTEL). CTEL, headquartered on the West campus, was originally established to meet the needs of teacher education in the West valley.

George Hynd resigned in December, 2009, to serve as provost of the College of Charleston. He was succeeded by interim dean Jim Rund. Rund served as interim dean for one semester, overseeing the disestablishment of FIGSE in May, 2010. In addition, Rund continued serving in his prior position as ASU Senior Vice President for Educational Outreach and Student Services.

Berliner and Glass retired when FIGSE was distablished in spring, 2010; Garcia retired a year later as vice president for schools and community relations. They continue to serve as emeritus professors.

== Faculty and rankings ==
FIGSE was highly ranked by U.S. News & World Report for eleven consecutive years preceding its disestablishment. In 2010, the year it was disestablished, FIGSE ranked as the 25th best school of education in the United States among public universities, and was ranked 36th best among both public and private institutions. Arizona State University's graduate education programs retained this ranking when U.S. News & World Report ranked Mary Lou Fulton Teachers College 25th among public graduate schools of education and 35th among all public and private graduate programs in the field in its 2012 rankings. FIGSE achieved its highest ranking in 2003 at 10th best among public institutions and 16th best among both publics and privates. In addition, its specialty programs in educational psychology, counseling, education policy, and curriculum and instruction were typically ranked in the top 15 nationally.

The Faculty Scholarly Productivity Index ranked FIGSE faculty as among the most productive in the nation, and the most productive at Arizona State University. In 2007, faculty in Curriculum and Instruction and Education Leadership and Administration ranked 4th and 6th, respectively, in productivity, out-producing faculty in any other unit within the Arizona State University.

At the time of its disestablishment, FIGSE was home to three Regents Professor, three endowed chairs, two NSF Early Career Scholars, four NAE/Spencer Postdoctoral Fellows, and one Presidential Early Career Award Winner. FIGSE was tied with the University of Wisconsin–Madison, the University of Pittsburgh, and the University of Pennsylvania for number of faculty with membership in the National Academy of Education (David Berliner, Michelene T. H. Chi, James Gee, and Gene V Glass), with only nine institutions boasting higher counts (Stanford, Harvard, Michigan, Chicago, Berkeley, New York University, CU Boulder, UCLA, and Columbia University's Teachers College).

U.S. News & World Report historical rankings of the Mary Lou Fulton Institute and Graduate School of Education, 1998–2010.

| Year | Among public GSEs | Among all GSEs |
|---|---|---|
| 1999 | 18 | 24 |
| 2000 | 12 | 17 |
| 2002 | 18 | 28 |
| 2003 | 10 | 16 |
| 2004 | 15 | 22 |
| 2005 | 26 | 35 |
| 2006 | 23 | 32 |
| 2007 | 21 | 31 |
| 2008 | 21 | 31 |
| 2009 | 14 | 24 |

In 2010 and 2011, the U.S. News rankings reflected the newly formed Mary Lou Fulton Teachers College; the 2010 rank was 35th, and the 2011 rank was 26th among all graduate schools of education.

== Organization and programs ==
In 2008, the three divisions of the Mary Lou Fulton College of Education (Curriculum and Instruction, Psychology in Education, and Education Leadership and Policy Studies) were reorganized into two new divisions: Advanced Studies in Education Policy, Leadership, and Curriculum; and Advanced Studies in Learning, Technology and Psychology in Education.

FIGSE offered a number of doctoral and masters programs.

Doctoral

- Applied Linguistics PhD
- Counseling Psychology PhD
- Curriculum and Instruction PhD, with concentrations in
  - Art Education
  - Curriculum Studies
  - Early Childhood Education
  - Engineering Education
  - English Education
  - Language and Literacy
  - Mathematics Education
  - Physical Education Pedagogy
  - Science Education
  - Special Education
- Educational Administration and Supervision EdD
- Educational Leadership and Policy Studies PhD
- Educational Psychology PhD, with concentrations in
  - Learning
  - Measurement, Statistics, and Methodological Studies
  - Life-Span Developmental Psychology
  - School Psychology
- Educational Technology PhD
- Higher and Postsecondary Education EdD

Masters

FIGSE offered several masters programs, including Curriculum and Instruction, Counseling Psychology, and others.

== Disestablishment ==
In April 2010, in response to an order from the Arizona Board of Regents (ABOR) made at its March meeting to cut 2.75% from the university's salary budget, Provost Elizabeth Phillips submitted a plan to university President Michael Crow to disestablish the Mary Lou Fulton Institute and Graduate School of Education. The plan also proposed the disestablishment or merger of other university units. The university estimated that the disestablishment of FIGSE would save $1,292,000 in salaries, although no faculty would be terminated. An external search for a new dean was underway at the time of the proposed closure. The University of Arizona, under the same budget reduction mandate from the Board of Regents, imposed a hiring freeze and tiered furloughs to meet its obligation. ASU had lost more than $108 million since 2008, and President Crow was reluctant to impose additional furloughs, which reduced salaries by $24 million the prior year. In a statement to the ASU community, President Crow wrote, "We understand the situation the state faces. During the next 30 days, we will be reviewing implementation measures to try to minimize disruption to our faculty and staff and keep them focused on providing exceptional service and education for Arizona students and their families."

The disestablishment of FIGSE was controversial, as it was opposed by FIGSE's faculty and students, and protested by the American Educational Research Association (AERA) in a letter sent to the University Provost.

Representing the FIGSE faculty, Professor Beth Blue Swadener made the following remarks to the ASU Faculty Senate on May 3, 2010, as the body considered whether or not to support the proposal:

I am substituting today for Carlos Ovando, who is in Denver at the American Educational Research Association annual meeting, where the FIGSE faculty and students have contributed to a total of 181 sessions.

During the meetings, two of our faculty colleagues were inducted as AERA Fellows, and one received a lifetime achievement award. Everywhere I went during the meetings I was asked about two things: Arizona's new immigration law and the disestablishment of the Mary Lou Fulton Institute and Graduate School at ASU, or "FIGSE."

While it is now too late to stop the latter, I believe it is important to go on record as opposed to not only the decision made by the administration, but to raise concerns about the process, and the lack of faculty consultation or representation. You have had the opportunity to read both the faculty and student statements concerning maintaining the integrity and high rankings of our graduate programs in education. As faculty, you can imagine that suddenly being told we were "free agents" and should not plan potential moves together with our program colleagues has led to fragmentation, loss of some very strong colleagues, and a lack of transparency and accurate information. Within this very challenging climate and short timeline, we have all worked hard to maintain program integrity and support our students.

We have also sought to support the 32 staff losing jobs, following the loss of 37 staff last year, in a reorganization of our college.

The larger context of concern to Senate is governance-- each time such major changes are made without faculty consultation or input, it has immediate and far-reaching impacts on our programs and, moreover, erodes traditions of faculty governance by making our work environment a more corporate, top-down space. As one colleague at AERA put it, "I thought ASU was a 21st Century New American University, but it looks more like a 19th Century factory with a boss controlling the workers!" Our sister institutions responded to the ABOR mandate in far less dramatic ways with future tiered furloughs (at UA) and closed searches and non-replacement measures at NAU. When I spoke with deans from both universities at the AERA meeting, they said that their presidents simply didn't view this as requiring any extreme measures.

Thus, while recognizing that it is too late to change the disestablishment of our Institute and Graduate School, I respectfully request that you vote "No" on this measure and thereby signal our university faculty's stand on the flawed process by which this action was taken, and the importance of faculty governance in such matters.

The ASU Faculty Senate voted against the proposed disestablishment, with 73 votes against the motion, 20 in favor, and 6 abstentions. On a related vote at the same meeting, the senate opposed the renaming of CTEL as the Mary Lou Fulton Teachers College by 75 to 18, with 5 abstentions.

Despite senate opposition, the Arizona Board of Regents approved Capaldi's proposal, and FIGSE was disestablished in May 2010. At the time, a majority of FIGSE faculty joined the College of Liberal Arts and Sciences, the School of Engineering, and a few other units. Today, 85 percent of former faculty members are affiliated and/or teaching courses for the Mary Lou Fulton Teachers College.

All FIGSE doctoral programs moved to the newly named Teachers College, except Applied Linguistics, which moved to the College of Liberal Arts and Sciences, and Counseling Psychology, which moved to the School of Letters and Sciences.

Carol D. Lee, president of the American Educational Research Association (AERA), sent a letter on behalf of the organization, urging ASU to reconsider:

Dear Provost Capaldi:

We are writing to you on behalf of the American Educational Research Association (AERA) to express our concerns about pending decisions that could reduce the vitality and significance of scholarship and training in education research at Arizona State University. AERA is the national interdisciplinary research association of approximately 25,000 scholars who undertake research in education. Founded in 1916, AERA aims to advance knowledge about education, to encourage scholarly inquiry related to education, and to promote the use of research to improve education and serve the public good. We are aware that many universities like ASU face stringent economic times and need to arrive at strategies that permit transformation and change consonant with mission and purpose. In considering fields of study and scholarship for higher education institutions, it would seem to be a priority for our nation to invest in the next generation of scholars and scholarship addressing the scientific study of education and learning and the policies and practices that shape educational outcomes from early education to the workforce. ASU has been the home to a community of highly productive faculty members known for the significance of their education research, the quality of their teaching and mentoring, and their professional service. Large numbers of your faculty are leading contributors to this field—publishing in the most competitive and highly ranked journals, holding prominent editorships, and serving as scientific advisors on committees nationally and internationally. For many years, Arizona State has enjoyed visibility as an environment that supports research and training of excellence in education research. We write, now, out of a concern that, while scholarship and training in education are important scientific and policy priorities to our nation, they may come to have a diminished role and presence at ASU through the proposed reorganization. Although we realize that talented faculty and their students are likely to be retained in any reorganization, the university's commitment to this arena of interdisciplinary scholarship will be seriously eroded were identifiable graduate programs to be disestablished and essentially eliminated at ASU.

We just quite recently learned of this turn of events and realize that we write at the eleventh hour. Nonetheless, we also are aware that you are strong in your commitment to vibrant interdisciplinary fields of inquiry and training. We believe that, with more time to examine the question and the quality of your graduate programs, ASU will be better situated to reach a decision that serves your institutional goals and that of the nation.

Therefore, we urge that you defer such action until options and opportunities can be fully identified and assessed.

We would welcome the opportunity to help in any way we can.

Sincerely,

Carol D. Lee, PhD, AERA 2010 President

Felice J. Levine, PhD, Executive Director

Arizona State University Executive Vice President and Provost Elizabeth D. Capaldi sent a letter dated April 20, 2010, in response to the letter from Carol D. Lee and Felice J. Levine.

Dear Dr. Lee and Dr. Levine:

Thank you for your letter noting concerns about Arizona State University's recent reorganization in our colleges of Education. Let me begin first by clarifying some erroneous information noted in your letter. Absolutely no graduate degree programs in education are being discontinued or disestablished as a result of this reorganization. Over the past three years of massive budget cuts in Arizona, we have been steadfast in our commitment to protect faculty lines and academic programs. This reorganization, like others we have undertaken, is an administration reorganization that reaps significant budget saving and also has the effect of reorganizing faculty into intellectual clusters that can continue to build on existing strengths and also forge new and important directions.

I am sharing with you a recent article published in Change that outlines what we have continued to try to accomplish through such reorganization at Arizona State University without compromising quality.

On a related note, as you may know, many of our doctoral programs are highly ranked. These rankings are based on the quality of the degree program and not the organizational umbrella under which the programs find themselves. We value the quality of research and educational vision that the majority of our faculties in education provide. We believe that this quality will continue to improve as our faculties from across the university coalesce around significant educational issues to be addressed in the decades ahead.

As you know, change can be very difficult. In the multiple reorganizations we have already put in place, faculty come to understand that there can be many wonderful new opportunities for them to explore with new colleagues and new programs. At the very core of much of these reorganizations has been an increased interdisciplinary synergy, with new programmatic opportunities for our students that would not have emerged in the traditional structures that were in place.

I am sorry you were misinformed.

Sincerely,

Elizabeth D. Capaldi,

Executive Vice President and Provost

Although no graduate education programs were disestablished concurrently with the disestablishment of FIGSE, the University immediately reorganized and restructured all education graduate programs, severely reducing options for majors, and eliminating all graduate programs specifically focused on the education of immigrant and Native students. FIGSE faculty reassigned to other units were not permitted to develop new programs, and were required to teach for Teachers College, with no right of participation in program management. By the end of 2011, more than a dozen senior FIGSE faculty had left ASU as a result of the reorganization,. Program rankings dropped dramatically for the College as well as for specific program areas.

== Teachers college ==
After FIGSE was disestablished, ASU shifted responsibility for nearly all graduate programs in education to the College of Teacher Education and Leadership (CTEL), which was established in 1985 on ASU's West campus. The Mary Lou Fulton endowment and much of the budgetary resources of FIGSE were transferred to CTEL, which was renamed Mary Lou Fulton Teachers College. U.S. News & World Report ranked Teachers College 16th among public graduate schools of education and 26th among all public and private graduate programs in the field. Last year ASU's graduate education programs ranked 25th and 35th respectively.

== List of deans of the Institute and Graduate School of Education (1955-2010) ==
| # | Name | Term began | Term ended |
|---|---|---|---|
| 1 | Guy D. McGrath | 1955 | 1968 |
| 2 | Harry K. Newburn | 1968 | 1969 |
| 3 | Del D. Weber | 1969 | 1978 |
| 4 | Robert Stout | 1978 | 1985 |
| 5 | Raymond Kulhavy, Interim | 1985 | December 1985 |
| 6 | Gladys Styles Johnston | January 1986 | 1991 |
| 7 | L. Dean Webb | 1991 | 1992 |
| 8 | Leonard A. Valverde | 1992 | 1997 |
| 9 | David Berliner | 1997 | 2001 |
| 10 | Sarah Hudelson, Interim | 2001 | 2002 |
| 11 | Eugene Garcia | 2002 | 2006 |
| 12 | Sarah Hudelson, Interim | 2006 | December 2007 |
| 13 | George Hynd | January 2008 | December 2009 |
| 14 | James Rund, Interim | January 2010 | May 2010 |
