= Kuder =

Kuder is a surname. Notable people with the surname include:

- Andrew Kuder (1838–1899), American soldier
- Aaron Kuder, American comic book artist and writer
- G. Frederic Kuder (1903–2000), American counseling psychologist and psychometrician
- Jeremiah Kuder (1835–1916), American soldier

== See also ==
- Kuder–Richardson Formula 20
