= 74th Indiana Infantry Regiment =

74th Regiment, Indiana Volunteer Infantry
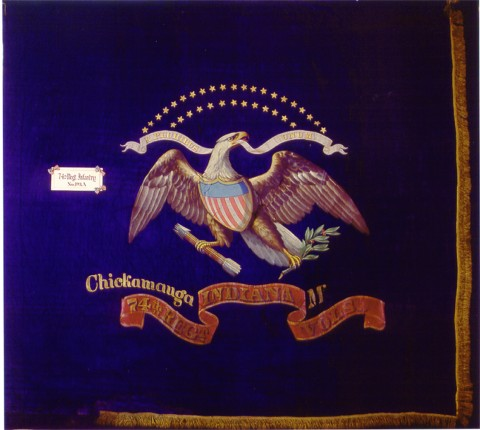
- Regimental battle flag of the 74th Indiana
- Active: August 21, 1862 – June 9, 1865
- Country: United States
- Allegiance: Union
- Branch: Infantry
- Engagements: Battle of Perryville; Battle of Stones River; Tullahoma Campaign; Battle of Chickamauga; Siege of Chattanooga; Battle of Missionary Ridge; Atlanta campaign Battle of Resaca; Battle of Kennesaw Mountain; Siege of Atlanta; Battle of Jonesborough; Sherman's March to the Sea; Carolinas campaign Battle of Bentonville

The 74th Indiana Infantry Regiment, officially known as the 74th Regiment, Indiana Volunteer Infantry, was an infantry regiment that served in the Union Army during the American Civil War.

== History ==
The 74th Indiana Infantry was organized at Fort Wayne, Indiana and mustered in for a three-year enlistment on August 21, 1862, under the command of Colonel Charles W. Chapman.

The regiment was attached to 2nd Brigade, 1st Division, Army of the Ohio, September 1862. 2nd Brigade, 1st Division, III Corps, Army of the Ohio, to November 1862. 2nd Brigade, 3rd Division, Center, XIV Corps, Army of the Cumberland, to January 1863. 2nd Brigade, 3rd Division, XIV Corps, to October 1863. 3rd Brigade, 3rd Division, XIV Corps, to June 1865.

The 74th Indiana Infantry mustered out of service at Washington, D.C., on June 9, 1865.

=== Chickamauga ===
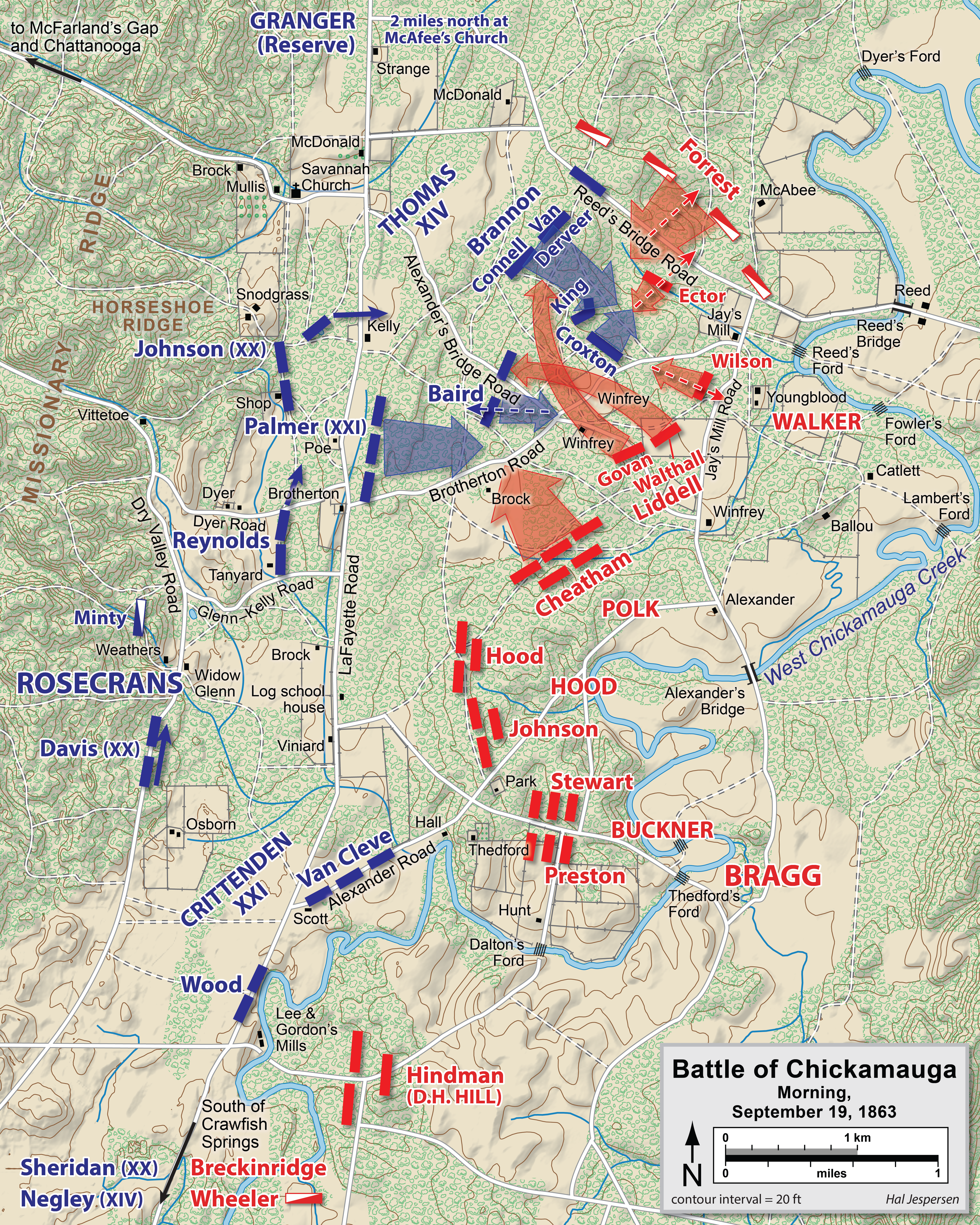
Actions at Chickamauga on the morning of 19 September

As the Battle of Chickamauga began on the morning of 19 September, George Henry Thomas sent John Croxton's brigade to capture a Confederate brigade reported by Colonel Daniel McCook to be trapped on the west side of Chickamauga Creek. The brigade moved down a parallel trail between the Reed's Bridge road and the Brotherton road, forming line of battle in an adjacent pine forest. The 74th Indiana held the right of the line, with the 10th Indiana to its left. With Croxton's brigade, the regiment fired engaged the 10th Confederate Cavalry of Henry Davidson's brigade, who were scouting the area, routing it before the Confederates came closer than rifle range. The brigade then resumed the advance, being halted by the dismounted cavalry of Davidson's brigade in forested terrain at the base of a ridge west of Jay's Mill Road, where the opposing forces exchanged fire. Despite poor visibility, the fire of Croxton's brigade caused Davidson's brigade to thrice temporarily retreat from the ridge.

When Claudius Wilson's Georgia Brigade, sent in to bolster the Confederate defense, attacked across the Brotherton road shortly after 09:00, they were spotted by Chapman, but his order for the right flank companies to retreat to face the Confederate advance was misunderstood as an order intended for the entire regiment, causing a general retreat. However, Croxton prevented the Confederates from taking advantage of this by shifting the 10th Kentucky from the brigade left to the right. After a volley from the 10th Kentucky stopped Wilson's advance, Chapman reformed the regiment on their right. Due to exhaustion after having fought for two hours, Croxton's regiments retreated nevertheless, albeit slowly. They were relieved by Colonel John H. King's Regular brigade before 11:00 and went to the rear to draw ammunition, having exhausted their supply of 60 rounds per man in the fighting.

After quickly receiving a new issue of ammunition, Croxton's brigade returned to the action after Benjamin Scribner's brigade was attacked, positioned on the crest of a ridge 400 yards northwest of King's brigade. As Croxton could not see the entire brigade of six regiments, he delegated command of its right half to Chapman. The brigade exchanged fire with Daniel Govan's Arkansas brigade for about a half hour before Chapman decided to preempt what he believed was an attack on the brigade right by Govan's brigade arising from the latter's deployment of skirmishers by ordering a charge. As the regiments came down the slope of the ridge, Chapman's horse was killed by a bullet, breaking its rider's arm in the fall. The Arkansans broke under the pressure and Govan's brigade retreated, allowing Croxton's brigade to recapture the abandoned guns of Van Pelt's and Flansburg's batteries. The retreat of Govan's brigade from the Union attack exposed St. John Liddell's brigade, which was also forced to retreat. Croxton's brigade continued to advance toward the Winfrey Farm, running into John K. Jackson's Confederate brigade, which they engaged for thirty minutes before retreating due to exhaustion from five nearly uninterrupted hours of combat. After the brigade entered the forest west of the Brotherton road, Jackson's advance was stopped by August Willich's brigade, and Croxton's brigade ended its fighting for 19 September.

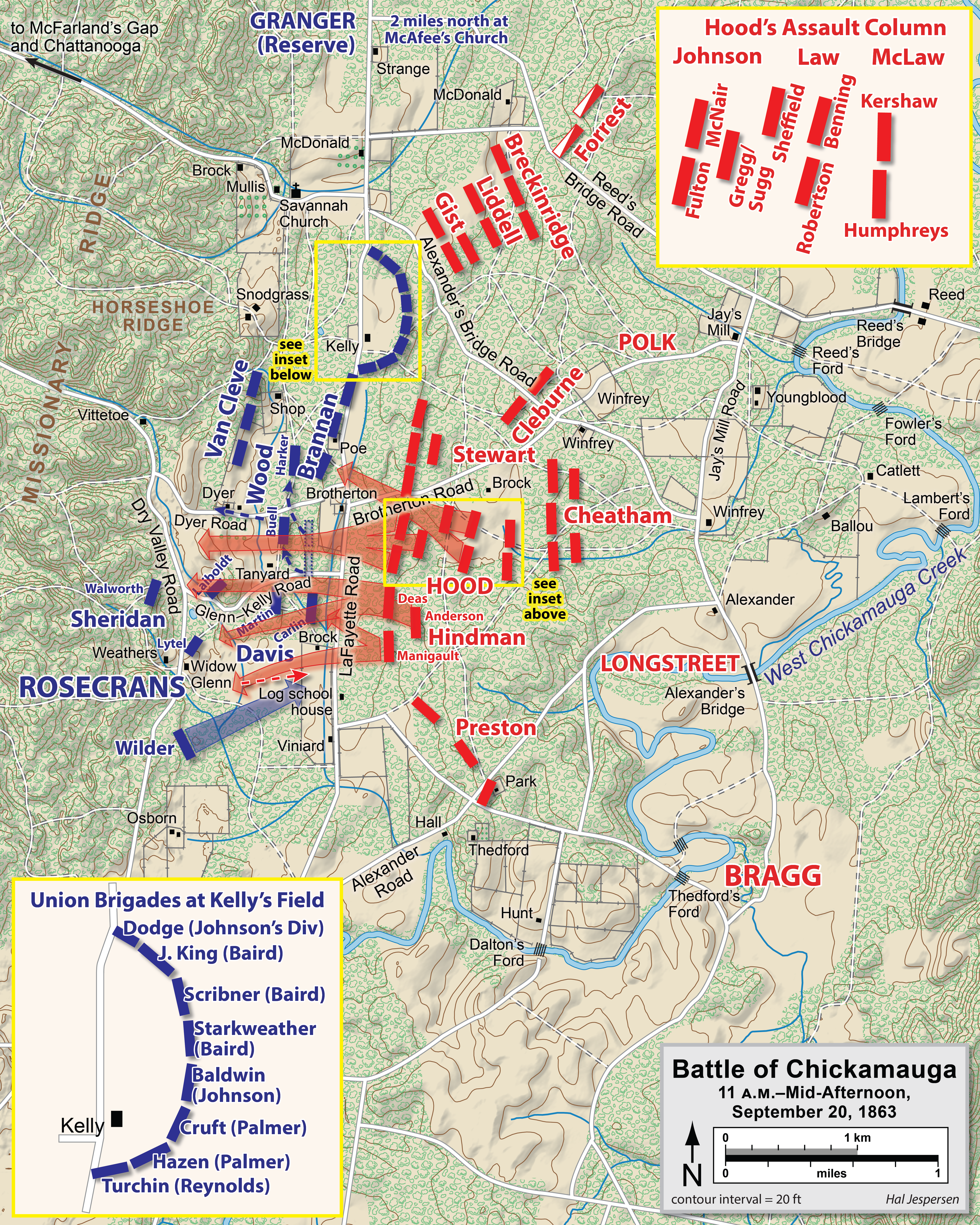
Longstreet's attack

On 20 September, the 10th and 74th Indiana repulsed the attack of John Brown's Tennessee Brigade in the Poe field. After James Longstreet's attack routed much of Brannan's Division, Croxton's brigade changed front, with the 10th and 74th Indiana taking position on the left of Battery C, 1st Ohio Light Artillery. During the subsequent attack of Henry Benning's Georgia Brigade, Croxton was wounded and the right of the brigade disintegrated. While the latter fled into the Dyer Field, 10th Indiana Lieutenant Colonel Marsh Taylor led his regiment and the 74th in an orderly retreat to the lines of John Reynolds' Division.

== Detailed service ==
Moved to Louisville, Kentucky, August 22, then to Bowling Green, Kentucky, and duty there until September 5. Moved to Louisville, Kentucky, September 5, 1862. (Companies C and K at siege of Munfordville, Kentucky, September 14–17. Captured September 17. Exchanged November 17, and rejoined regiment at Castillian, Tennessee, December 4, 1862.) Pursuit of Bragg into Kentucky October 1–15. Battle of Perryville, October 8. March to Gallatin, Tenn.. and duty there and at Castillian until January 1863. Operations against Morgan December 22, 1862, to January 2, 1863. Boston December 29, 1862. Moved to Nashville, Tennessee, January 13, 1863, then to Murfreesboro, and duty there until June. Expedition toward Columbia March 4–14. Tullahoma Campaign June 23-July 7. Hoover's Gap June 24–26. Tullahoma June 29–30. Occupation of middle Tennessee until August 16. Passage of the Cumberland Mountains and Tennessee River and Chickamauga Campaign August 16-September 22. Battle of Chickamauga, September 19–21. Siege of Chattanooga, September 24-November 23. Before Chattanooga September 22–26. Chattanooga-Ringgold Campaign November 23–27. Orchard Knob November 23–24. Missionary Ridge November 25. Pursuit to Ringgold November 26–27. Demonstration on Dalton, Georgia, February 22–27, 1864. Tunnel Hill, Buzzard's Roost Gap, and Rocky Raced Ridge, February 23–25. Atlanta Campaign May 1-September 8. Demonstrations on Rocky Faced Ridge May 8–11. Battle of Resaca May 14–15. Advance on Dallas May 18–25. Operations on Pumpkin Vine Creek and battles about Dallas, New Hope Church, and Allatoona Hills May 25-June 5. Operations about Marietta and against Kennesaw Mountain June 10-July 2. Pine Hill June 11–14. Lost Mountain June 15–17. Assault on Kennesaw June 27. Ruff's Station July 4. Chattahoochie River July 5–17. Peachtree Creek July 19–20. Siege of Atlanta July 22-August 25. Utoy Creek August 5–7. Flank movement on Jonesboro August 25–30. Battle of Jonesboro August 31-September 1. Lovejoy's Station September 2–6. Operations against Hood in northern Georgia and northern Alabama September 29-November 3. Kingston, Georgia, November 8 and 10. March to the sea November 15-December 10. Siege of Savannah December 10–21. Campaign of the Carolinas January to April, 1865. Fayetteville, North Carolina, March 11. Averysboro March 16. Battle of Bentonville March 19–21. Occupation of Goldsboro March 24. Advance on Raleigh April 10–14. Occupation of Raleigh April 14. Bennett's House April 26. Surrender of Johnston and his army. March to Washington, D.C., via Richmond, Virginia, April 29-May 19. Grand Review of the Armies May 24.

== Casualties ==
The regiment lost a total of 274 men during service; 5 officers and 86 enlisted men killed or mortally wounded, 2 officers and 181 enlisted men died of disease.

== Commanders ==
- Colonel Charles W. Chapman
- Lieutenant Colonel Myron Baker - commanded at the battle of Chickamauga

== Notable members ==
- 2nd Lieutenant Orville T. Chamberlain, Company G - Medal of Honor recipient for action at the battle of Chickamauga
- Lieutenant Jeremiah Kuder, Company A - Medal of Honor recipient for action at the battle of Jonesboro

== See also ==
- List of Indiana Civil War regiments
- Indiana in the Civil War
