= Conesus, New York =

- Town
- Location within New York Location within the United States
- Coordinates: 42°43′9″N 77°40′29″W
- Country: United States
- State: New York
- County: Livingston

Government
  - Type: Town Council
  - Town Supervisor: Brenda B. Donahue (R)
  - Town Council: Members' List: • Richard P. Bell (R); • Donald W. Wester (R); • Ronald Steenblok (R); • Timothy A. Beardslee (R)

Area
  - Total: 35.87 sq mi (92.90 km^{2})
  - Land: 32.89 sq mi (85.19 km^{2})
  - Water: 2.98 sq mi (7.72 km^{2})
- Elevation: 1,407 ft (429 m)

Population (2010)
  - Total: 2,473
  - Estimate (2016): 2,409
  - Density: 73.2/sq mi (28.28/km^{2})
- Time zone: UTC-5 (Eastern (EST))
  - Summer (DST): UTC-4 (EDT)
- ZIP code: 14435
- Area code: 585
- FIPS code: 36-051-17618
- GNIS feature ID: 0978858
- Website: www.town.conesus.ny.us

Conesus, originally /kəˈniːsəs/, now more commonly /kəˈniːʃəs/, is a town in Livingston County, New York, United States. The population was 2,473 at the 2010 census. The name is said to be derived from a Seneca word, Ga-ne-a-sos, translated as “place of nanny berries"

Conesus is on the county's east border, is bordered in part by Conesus Lake and Hemlock Lake, and is north of Dansville.

== History ==
Settlement began circa 1795. In 1819, Conesus was formed from parts of the towns of Groveland and Livonia as the town Freeport. The name was changed to "Bowersville" in March 1825 and was changed to "Conesus" a month later.

Conesus is home to the former St. Michael's Mission, a school for Catholic priests that operated from the 1930s until the 1970s. The sprawling complex on Mission Road is now owned by an evangelical Christian church from Colorado Springs.

The town is also the location of O-Neh-Da Vineyard, which has roots back to 1872 and is one of the last wineries in the country to make sacramental wine from their own vineyards.

The Conesus Amusement Hall, Kellerman Log Cabin, Payne Cobblestone House, and Sliker Cobblestone House are listed on the National Register of Historic Places.

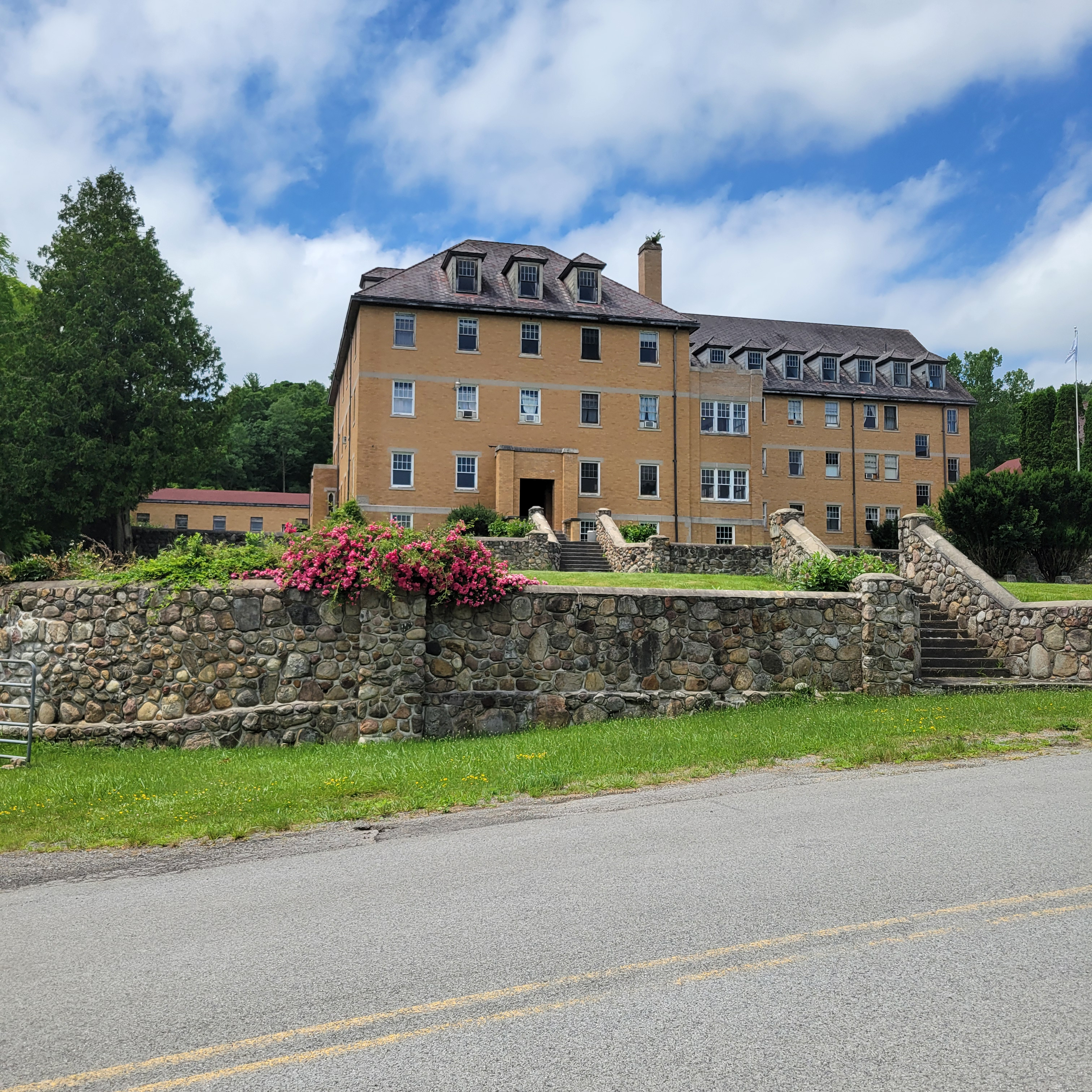
Building formerly known as St. Michael's Mission in 2024

== Geography ==
According to the United States Census Bureau, the town has a total area of 35.9 square miles (92.9 km^{2}), of which 32.9 square miles (85.2 km^{2}) are land and 3.0 square miles (7.7 km^{2}), or 8.31%, are water.

Conesus Lake is on the west border of the town, and Hemlock Lake is on the east border of the town. Both lakes are considered minor Finger Lakes. The east town line is the border of Ontario County. Several communities, including Sunny Shores, Excelsior Springs, and Walkleys Landing, are located on the east shore of Conesus Lake in the town. There is no housing along the shore of Hemlock Lake, because it is owned by the city of Rochester for its water supply.

New York State Route 15 is an important north-south highway, which intersects the former New York State Route 255 at Conesus village.

=== Adjacent towns and areas ===
(Clockwise)

- Livonia
- Canadice
- Springwater; Sparta
- Groveland; Geneseo

== Demographics ==
Historical population
Census	Pop.	Note	%±
1820	1,288		—
1830	1,690		31.2%
1840	1,654		−2.1%
1850	1,418		−14.3%
1860	1,443		1.8%
1870	1,362		−5.6%
1880	1,397		2.6%
1890	1,196		−14.4%
1900	1,149		−3.9%
1910	937		−18.5%
1920	814		−13.1%
1930	832		2.2%
1940	809		−2.8%
1950	809		0.0%
1960	1,221		50.9%
1970	1,533		25.6%
1980	1,970		28.5%
1990	2,196		11.5%
2000	2,353		7.1%
2010	2,473		5.1%
2016 (est.)	2,409	▼	−2.6%
U.S. Decennial Census

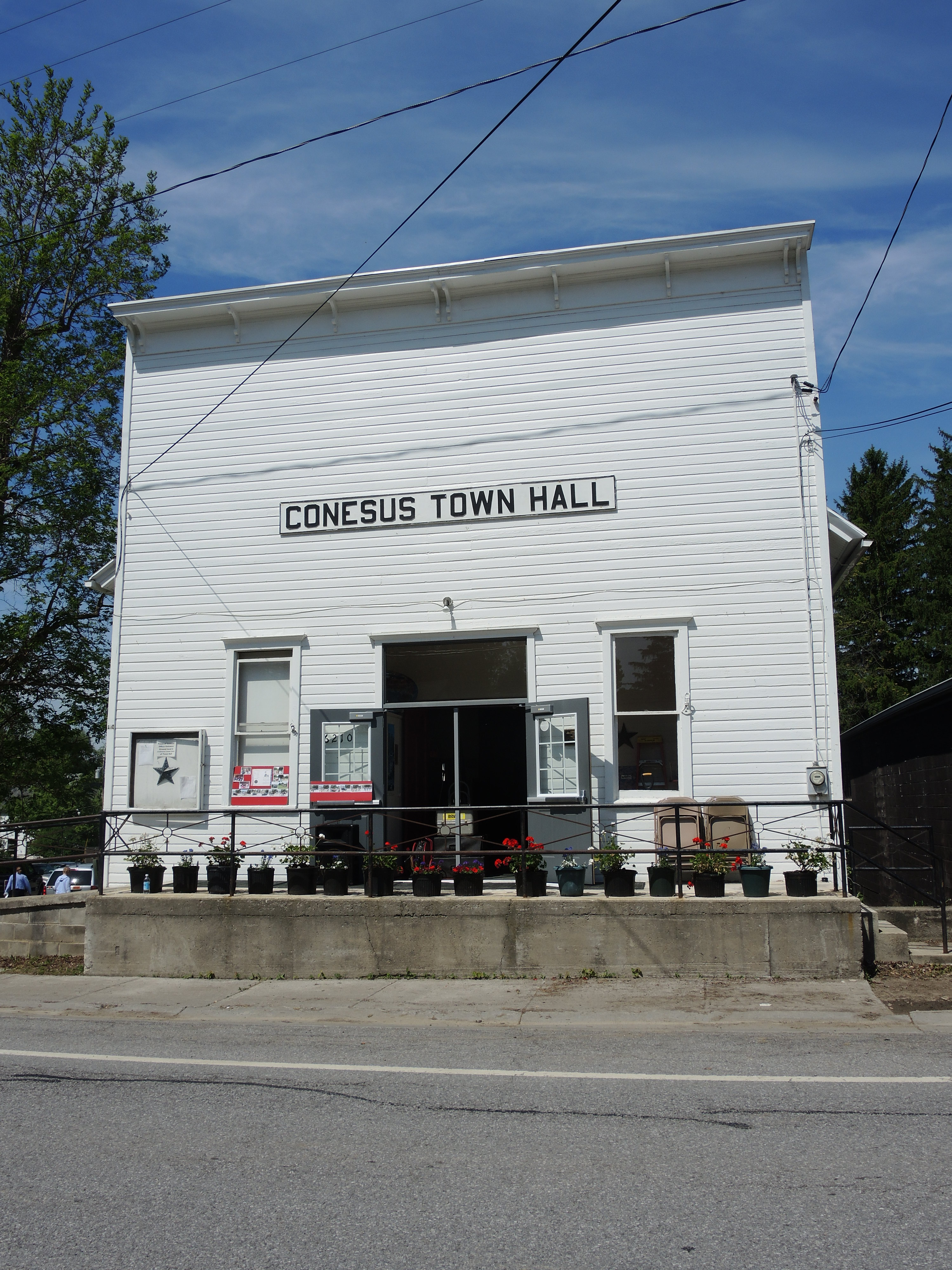
Conesus town hall

As of the census of 2000, there were 2,353 people, 869 households, and 662 families residing in the town. The population density was 71.5 inhabitants per square mile (27.6/km^{2}). There were 983 housing units at an average density of 29.9 per square mile (11.5/km^{2}). The racial makeup of the town was 98.43% White, 0.17% African American, 0.34% Native American, 0.04% Asian, 0.13% from other races, and 0.89% from two or more races. Hispanic or Latino of any race were 0.21% of the population.

There were 869 households, out of which 38.7% had children under the age of 18 living with them, 63.6% were married couples living together, 7.9% had a female householder with no husband present, and 23.8% were non-families. 18.2% of all households were made up of individuals, and 7.1% had someone living alone who was 65 years of age or older. The average household size was 2.69 and the average family size was 3.05.

In the town, the population was spread out, with 27.4% under the age of 18, 6.2% from 18 to 24, 31.0% from 25 to 44, 25.8% from 45 to 64, and 9.6% who were 65 years of age or older. The median age was 38 years. For every 100 females, there were 97.7 males. For every 100 females age 18 and over, there were 96.4 males.

The median income for a household in the town was $48,200, and the median income for a family was $53,125. Males had a median income of $40,313 versus $25,000 for females. The per capita income for the town was $22,773. About 3.9% of families and 5.3% of the population were below the poverty line, including 7.0% of those under age 18 and 3.5% of those age 65 or over.

== Notable people ==
- Andrew Kuder, soldier who fought in the American Civil War.
- Frederick D. Losey, Shakespearian scholar and elocutionist
- Daniel Shays, a leader of Shays' Rebellion

== Communities and locations in Conesus ==
- Conesus – The hamlet of Conesus on NY-15.
- Conesus Inlet – A stream draining into the south part of Conesus Lake.
- Conesus Inlet Fish and Wildlife Management Area – A conservation area at the south end of Conesus Lake.
- Crocketts Corners – A location north of Conesus village on NY-15.
- Excelsior Springs – A location on Conesus Lake, north of Walkleys Landing.
- Foots Corners – A hamlet north of Conesus village on NY-15.
- McMillan Creek – A stream flowing through Conesus village and terminating in Conesus Lake.
- Sunny Shores – A location on the north town line by Conesus Lake.
- Union Corners – A former community in the town.
- Walkleys Landing – A hamlet at the south end of Conesus Lake.
- Websters Crossing – A hamlet by the south town line on NY-15 and McMillan Creek.

All of the hamlets listed on the shore of Conesus Lake are part of the Conesus Lake census-designated place.
