= Lawrence Hubert =

American psychologist

Lawrence J. Hubert (born 23 May 1944) is an American psychologist and statistician.

Hubert earned a doctorate from Stanford University under Lee Cronbach and Patrick Suppes, and held professorships in psychology (later as Lyle H. Lanier Professor) and statistics at the University of Illinois at Urbana–Champaign. Hubert was elected a foreign member of the Royal Netherlands Academy of Arts and Sciences in 2007. The Psychometric Society gave him the Career Award for Lifetime Achievement in 2015.
