= Kellerman Log Cabin =

Historic house in New York, United States

- U.S. National Register of Historic Places
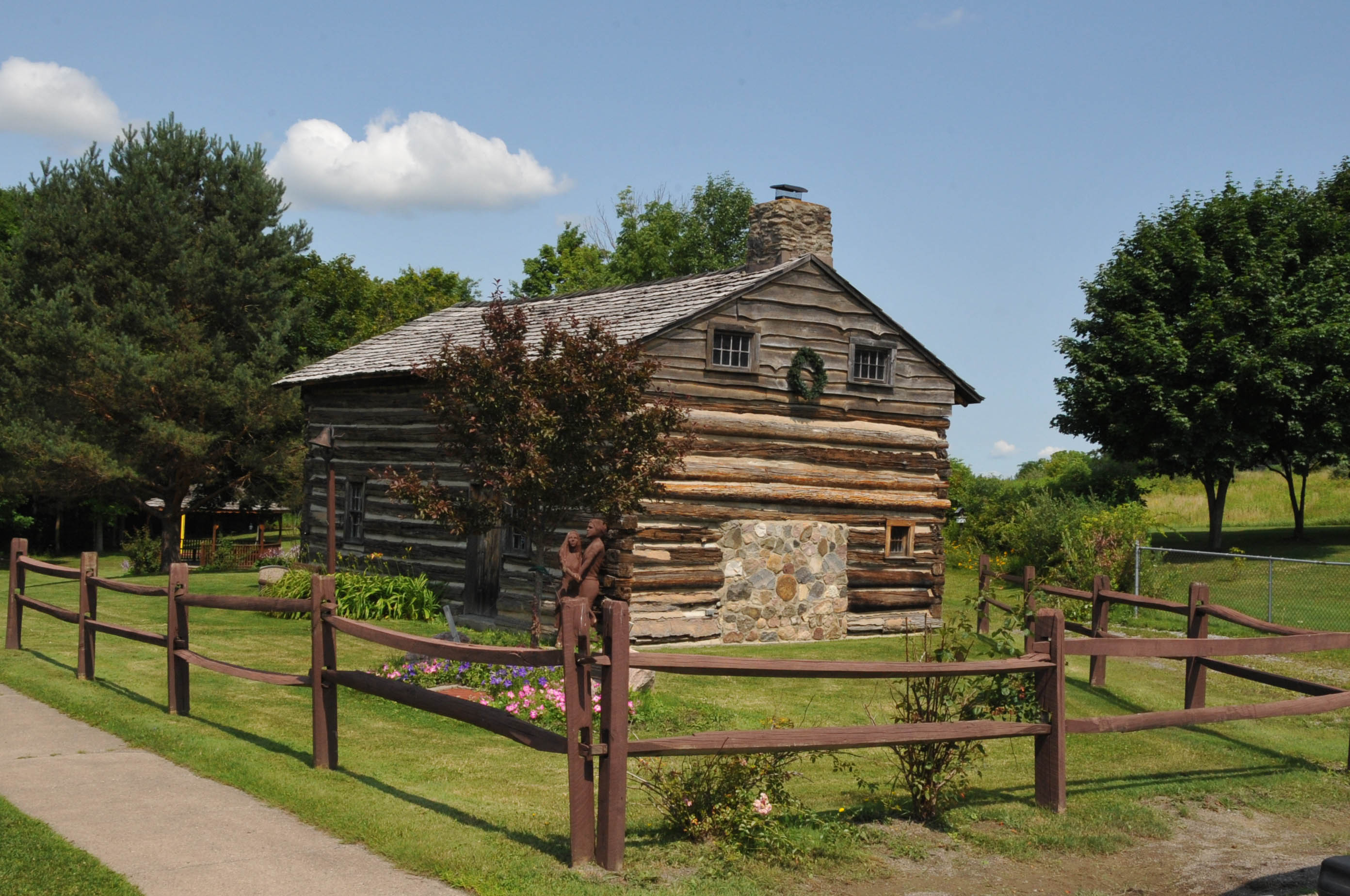

- Location within New York Location within the United States
- Nearest city: Conesus, New York
- Coordinates: 42°43′35″N 77°40′30″W
- Area: 0.1 acres (0.040 ha)
- Architectural style: squared-log cabin
- NRHP reference No.: 05001615
- Added to NRHP: February 1, 2006

Kellerman Log Cabin is a historic home located at Conesus in Livingston County, New York. It is a one-story, 20 foot by 24 foot building with a large partially exposed fieldstone chimney. It is constructed of stacked adzed logs with dovetail corner joints and mud chinking. It was built in 1816 by Isaac Kellerman. It is a rare settlement era log cabin, and one of five surviving log cabins in the upper Genesee Valley. In 1978, it was moved from its original site to a public park and now houses Ganeasos History Keepers, a local history organization.

It was listed on the National Register of Historic Places in 2007.
