= Frederick D. Losey =

American academic and elocutionist (1886–1932)

- Born: Frederick Douglas Losey; November 6, 1886; Conesus, New York, US
- Died: June 5, 1932 (aged 45); New York City, New York, US
- Other name: Fred D. Losey
- Education: University of Rochester, B.A., 1891; Harvard University, M.A., 1899
- Occupations: Elocutionist; Academic
- Employer(s): Syracuse University; University of Alabama; University of Nebraska; Columbia University
- Known for: Shakespearian scholar and elocutionist
- Honours: Honorary Ph.D., Syracuse University

Frederick Douglas Losey (November 6, 1866 – June 5, 1932) was an American Shakespearian scholar and elocutionist. He was the head of rhetoric and public speaking at Syracuse University and also taught at the University of Alabama. He was considered "America's greatest interpreter of Shakespeare." During the 1920s, he was also "as well known as the celebrities of the professional stage."

== Early life and education ==
Losey was born in Conesus, New York, the son of Elizabeth Frances (née Knapp) and Jesse Bradford Losey, a doctor who was a cavalry surgeon during the American Civil War.

Losey attended the University of Rochester, graduating with honors in 1891. There, he was a member of the Fraternity of Delta Psi (St. Anthony Hall) and Phi Beta Kappa. He was also president of this class. He then took classes at the National School of Oratory in Philadelphia. He then attended Harvard University, receiving a Master of Arts degree in English, graduating in 1899. This was followed by another year of advanced study at Harvard.

In 1926, he received an honorary Ph.D. from Syracuse University.

== Career ==
=== Elocutionist ===
In 1888, Losey began his career as an elocutionist, impersonator, and character actor who interpreted the classics for general audiences. During this period, his performances included poetry and short stories such as "Spellin' Down the Master" by Edward Eggleston, "A Man's a Man for A' That" by Robert Burns paired with "A Man's A Man For A' That" by Charles Mackay, and "The Defense of the Bride" by Anna Katherine Greene. He also performed the chariot race from the novel Ben-Hur and Oliver Twist by Charles Dickens, which was divided into acts.

=== Chautauqua circuit ===
In 1891, he was a speaker at the Chautauqua in Silver Lake, New York. In November 1892, Losey and his wife taught a course at the Camden, New York Chautauqua. The local newspaper said, "Mr. and Mrs. Losey are both artists and their entertainment was in our opinion the best ever given in Camden." He also was presenter for the Louisiana Chautauqua Society in July 1893 and the San Marcus Chautauqua in July 1894 in Texas. The latter reported, "Frederick D. Losey of New York carried his audiences by storm today...and is pronounced the greatest impersonator that has ever appeared on the Chautauqua platform in the state."

On February 17, 1896, he gave his Oliver Twist presentation to some 2,000 people at The New York Chautauqua in Chautauqua, New York, impersonating twelve characters. The newspaper said, "Mr. Losey is an artist. His versatility is something wonderful. The interest which he sustained in this intensely dramatic play, alone and without costume or scenery, testified to his power." In 1916, he presented a series of readings at The New York Chautauqua in Chautauqua, New York.

=== Teacher ===
In October 1892, Losey and his wife started giving classes and private lessons in elocution and physical culture two days a week in the studio in the Cox Building in Rochester. By February 1895, he had moved his studio to the Granite Building. Circa 1894, he was also a lecturer at the National School of Oratory in Philadelphia.

=== Academic ===
==== Syracuse University ====
After completing his M.A., Losey taught at Syracuse University for six years, from 1900 to 1906. The first year, he was an instructor of English. He was promoted to associate professor of English, a position he had for three years. For the final two years, he was a full professor and head of the department of rhetoric and public speaking, teaching classes in critical reading of Shakespeare, dramatic reading, English composition, publish speaking, and argumentation and debate.

While at Syracuse, he managed the University Debating Union and founded the Boar's Head Dramatic Society. In April 1904, he directed the dramatic society's first production, King Lear, and also performed the title role. For the production, Losey called upon modern Shakespearian scholarship and restored a few pages of the play that Edwin Booth admitted. The play was performed in Auburn, at The Lyceum in Rochester and the Wieting Opera House in Syracuse. However, in May 1904, the New York Dramatic Mirror noted that Syracuse was a Methodist institution, and the Methodist Church's Book of Discipline prohibits attending the theater. In November 1904, Losey put out a casting call for a production of Julius Caesar. He also directed The Taming of the Shrew and around nine other plays.

In June 1906, it was reported that Losey had resigned from Syracuse University "due to the decision of the faculty to graduate a man whom he declared deficient in studies." A few days later, Losey released the letter he sent to Chancellor Day, accusing the chancellor of "reinstating students that had been dismissed for deficiency," giving degrees against faculty recommendations, allowing abuses in athletics, and taking away power from the faculty. Under such circumstances, Losey was "obliged to resign." Day replied that he felt sure he would have the backing of the university's trustees. Furthermore, Day said, "Professor Lowry had chronic irritability; that the standard of scholarship was quite good before the professor joined the faculty..."

==== University of Nebraska ====
In December 1906, Losey was appointed adjunct professor of rhetoric by the University of Nebraska, filling the remainder of the spring 1907 semester. There, he was in charge of courses in elocution and public speaking, and also taught English composition. He also coached the senior play committee in their play for commencement.

==== University of Alabama ====
In the fall of 1906, Losey joined the faculty of the University of Alabama for nine years, from 1907 through 1916. Initially, he was the chair of a new department of public speaking. In 1908, he became an assistant professor of English, teaching English and elocution.

In 1907, he founded the student dramatic organization Blackfriars and served as its director. Their first show was The Taming of the Shrew which had an expensive and elaborate production in 1907. To raise the funds needed for the play, Losey gave a series of six Shakespearian recitals at the Elk's Auditorium, including Julius Caesar, Macbeth, and Othello. In 1908, the Blackfriars staged Macbeth, with Losey serving as director and performing the title role; Mrs. Losey played Lady Macbeth. In 1910, Blackfriars performed Twelfth Night under the direction of Losey who also took the role Sir Toby Belch. He directed the group in George Bernard Shaw's Candida in 1912. Blackfriars presented their shows in Tuscaloosa and in cities such as Birmingham, Huntsville, Meridian, Mobile, Montgomery, and Selma, becoming "a powerful force for amateur dramatics in the state." After Losey's tenure, Blackfriars continued under the leadership of Hudson Strode who found his love for theater while studying drama under Losey.

In December 1915, Dr. George H. Denny, president of the University of Alabama, declined to recommend Losey to the board of trustees for re-election to his position. Denny cited "temperamental unfitness" and also mentioned friction between Losey and Charles H. Barnwell, head of the English department. In response, Losey brought charges against Denny to the university's board in January 1916, maintaining he was being terminated because of personal animosity resulting from his questioning Denny about report cards, not because of his performance. Losey also sent their correspondences to the newspaper for publication, including his original claim that Denny was changing or obliterating grades on report cards to deceive parents. In one of the letters, Denny writes, "You have searched my record for sixteen years in the attempt to discover evidence against me; ...you seek to not only to punish me for my temerity in addressing a protest to you, but also to destroy every chance for my future in university work in that you seek my dismissal rather than my resignation." During the hearing with the board, Dr. Barnwell admitted that Losey was right about Denny's treatment of report cards. Nevertheless, Losey's request for more time to gather evidence and witnesses was denied. Ultimately, the board sustained Denny and asked Losey to resign.

==== Columbia University ====
Losey taught summer school at Columbia University in 1915. He taught two class—interpretation of literature and methods of debate. He returned to Columbia for the summer session in 1916.

=== Shakespearian recitals ===
Despite being a professor with a "vivid personality," Losey left academia in 1916 and devoted his time to Shakespearian lectures and recitals. One newspaper reported, "Professor Losey's love for the great literature, particularly for Shakespeare: his profound belief in democracy, and his conviction that the best that had been said or thought in the word is the rightful heritage of the common man, led him to abandon the university classroom after sixteen years of teaching and enter a wider educational field as lecturer and author."

Losey traveled to every state in the union, performing dramatic readings and lectures for hundreds of audiences consisting of students, high school teachers, literary clubs, college professors, and the general public. He spoke at churches, colleges, opera houses, schools, and YMCAs. During World War I, he lectured at the Army Educational Corps in France. He also lectured at the Brooklyn Institute from 1918 to 1919. In 1922, he participated in teacher institutes for Pennsylvania's Department of Public Instruction, helping to "make a noticeable improvement in the teaching staff....

Losey's readings of Shakespeare included "a keen appreciation of dramatic effect...[with] sharply-chiseled portrayals." One of his lectures was "Macbeth: Inevitability of Consequences." A critic noted that this performance revealed "the art and human passion that the academic study of the text fails to disclose." He also discussed King Lear as a lesson in parenthood and "King Lear: The Redemption of a Great Soul." Another lecture covered "Shakespeare as a Moral and Religious Teacher." He also taught high school students about Hamlet, Julius Caesar, and Macbeth.

In December each year, he read A Christmas Carol by Charles Dickens at various colleges. This tradition may have started on December 18, 1904 when he performed the story at the Central Baptist Church of Syracuse for a benefit held by Women's Society of the church.

Losey's last performance was given on April 27, 1932, at Colgate University.

== Publications ==
Losey edited the Complete Poetic and Dramatic Works of Shakespeare, published in one volume by John C. Winston Company in 1926. This was commonly referred to as the "Losey Shakespeare." Losey wrote an introduction, biography, glossary, index to characters, and an interpretation to each play. This collection was issued in London in 1927 and 1932 as the Kingsway Shakespeare. It was also reissued in America in 1952.

A selection of his publications follows:

- Losey Frederick D. "The New Scholarship, a Basis for Fraternal Relations." The Phi Beta Kappa Key. 1915; 2(8): 376–381.
- Shakespeare, William. Complete Poetic and Dramatic Works of Shakespeare, Losey, Frederick D., editor. Philadelphia: John C. Winston Company, 1926.

== Personal ==
Losey married Marie L. Hale of Rochester, New York in 1890. She was also a graduate of the National School of Oratory and taught high school in Rochester before she was married. She performed as Marie Hale-Losey on the bill with her husband, reciting stories. The couple resided in Rochester, New York, moving to Massachusetts while he attended Harvard. They then moved to Syracuse and Tuscaloosa for his work. At Syracuse University, Marie was an associate professor of public speaking. In 1914, Marie became the first dean of women at the University of Alabama. They did not have any children.

Losey was a member of the National Arts Club in New York City and the Evening Card Club in Tuscaloosa. In 1896, he signed a petition challenging the Fraternity of Delta Psi for revoking the charter University of Rochester chapter. Losey performed in amateur theatrical productions on occasion. In April 1897, he played Timon in a production of Timon of Athens by the Rochester Shakespeare Society. In November 1899, he portrayed Martin Luther in The Story of the Reformation, or the Life of Luther at The Lyceum in Rochester.

In 1917, Losey started devoting half of his public speaking events in support of women's suffrage. He spoke on this topic at an open-air mass meeting in Hudson Falls, New York on October 27, 1917.

After being ill for several months from heart failure, he died at his home at 227 Riverside Drive in New York City at the age of 65 on June 5, 1932.
