= Fertilizers, Pills & Magnetic Strips =

2008 book by Gene V. Glass

- Author: Gene V Glass
- Language: English
- Genre: Non-fiction
- Publisher: Information Age Publishing
- Publication date: 2008
- Publication place: United States

Fertilizers, Pills & Magnetic Strips: The Fate of Public Education in America is a 2008 book published by Gene V Glass in which contemporary education debates are seen as the result of demographic and economic trends throughout the 20th Century. The book was published by Information Age Publishing, Inc. of Charlotte, North Carolina.
