= Conesus Amusement Hall =

- U.S. National Register of Historic Places
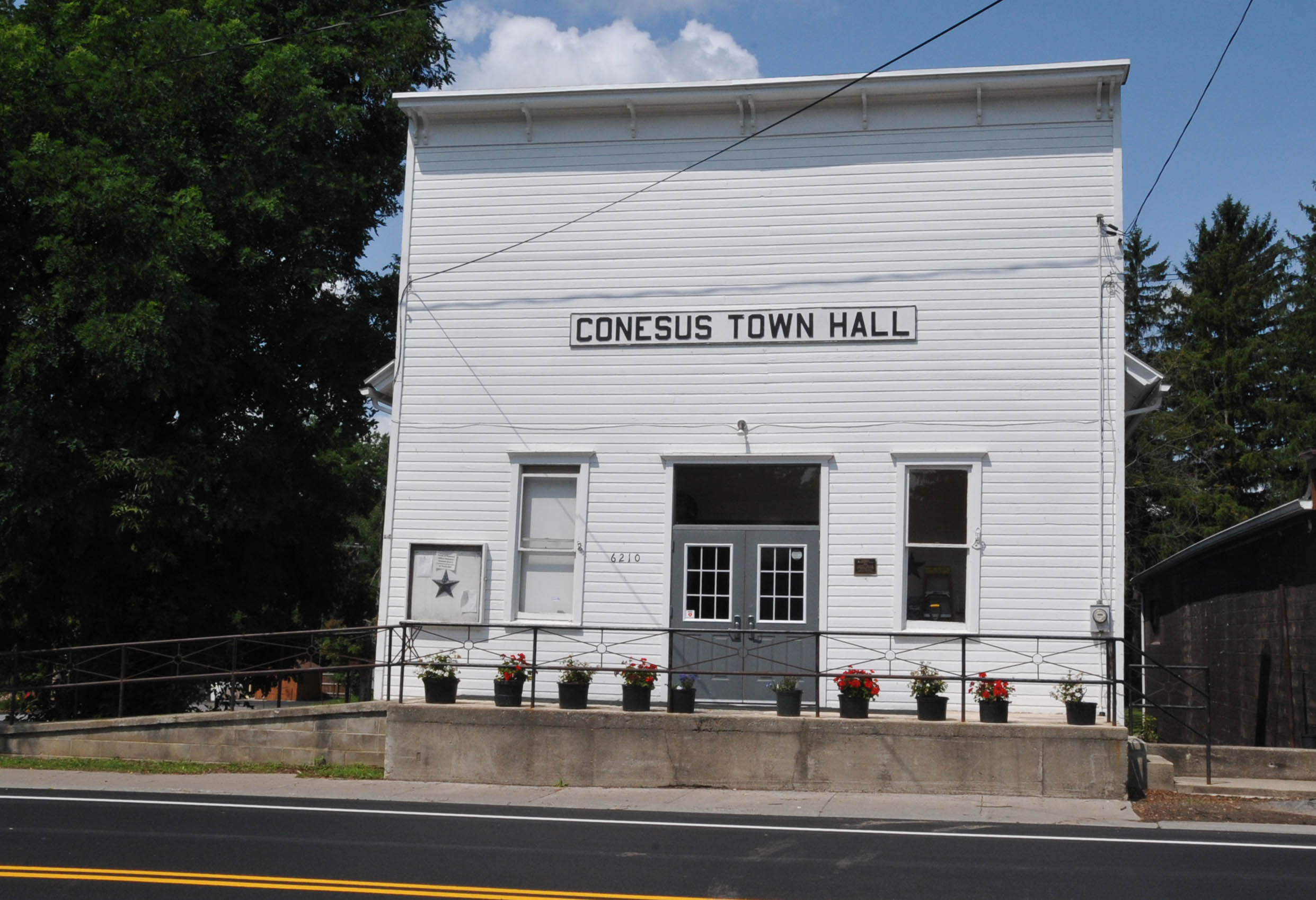

- Location within New York Location within the United States
- Location: 6210 S. Livonia Rd., Conesus, New York
- Coordinates: 42°43′15″N 77°40′35″W
- Area: 0.4 acres (0.16 ha)
- Built: 1888
- Architectural style: Queen Anne
- NRHP reference No.: 05000567
- Added to NRHP: June 10, 2005

Conesus Amusement Hall, now known as Conesus Town Hall, is a historic multi-purpose community hall located at Conesus in Livingston County, New York. It was completed in 1888 and is a 1-story, three-by-four-bay frame structure, approximately 30 feet by 70 feet. Since the 1980s, the hall has also served as the offices for the town government.

It was listed on the National Register of Historic Places in 2005.
