= Mary Lee Smith =

American researcher known for using meta-analysis for reporting research outcomes

- Born: Mary Lee Smith
- Education: University of Colorado Boulder
- Occupations: Professor, academic researcher
- Known for: Meta-analysis
- Notable work: The Benefits of Psychotherapy

Mary Lee Smith is an American researcher and academic, whose work spanned across fields from psychology, to research methodology, to education reform. She is a Regents' Professor Emeritus of education policy and measurement, statistics, and research methodology at Arizona State University. Smith, along with Gene Glass, were known for their pioneering work in using meta-analyses for reporting research outcomes.

== Education ==
Smith attended the University of Colorado Boulder on a scholarship for her undergraduate studies. Going against advice to become a high school teacher, Smith returned to the University of Colorado Boulder to earn a PhD in counseling psychology.

== Career ==
Following her doctorate, Smith joined the faculty at the University of Colorado in research methodology. There, she worked closely with Gene Glass in incorporating meta-analyses into research. Interviews conducted by Morton Hunt revealed that Smith worked along Glass in locating the studies, constructing the sample, assessing the materials, coding, and calculating effect sizes. Smith and Glass were later co-principal investigators on several important studies using meta-analyses in psychology, and together with Thomas Miller, published the book Benefits of Psychotherapy in 1980.

Later on, Smith became a faculty member at Arizona State University, where her research interests focused on school and education policy. She has published numerous publications on education policy, and published the book, Political Spectacle and the Fate of American Schools in 2003.

== Selected publications ==
- Smith, ML; Glass, GV (1977). "Meta-analysis of psychotherapy outcome studies". Am Psychol. 32 (9): 752–760. doi:10.1037/0003-066x.32.9.752. PMID 921048.
- Smith, ML (1980). "Sex bias in counseling and psychotherapy". Psychol Bull. 87 (2): 392–407. doi:10.1037/0033-2909.87.2.392. PMID 7375605.
- Smith, Mary Lee; Glass, Gene V.; Miller, Thomas I. (1980). The Benefits of Psychotherapy. Baltimore: The Johns Hopkins University Press. ISBN 0801823528.
- Smith, Mary Lee; Miller-Kahn, Linda; Heinecke, Walter; Jarvis, Patricia F. (2003). Political Spectacle and the Fate of American Schools. New York: Routledge. ISBN 0415932017.
