= Nicholas Burbules =

American philosopher

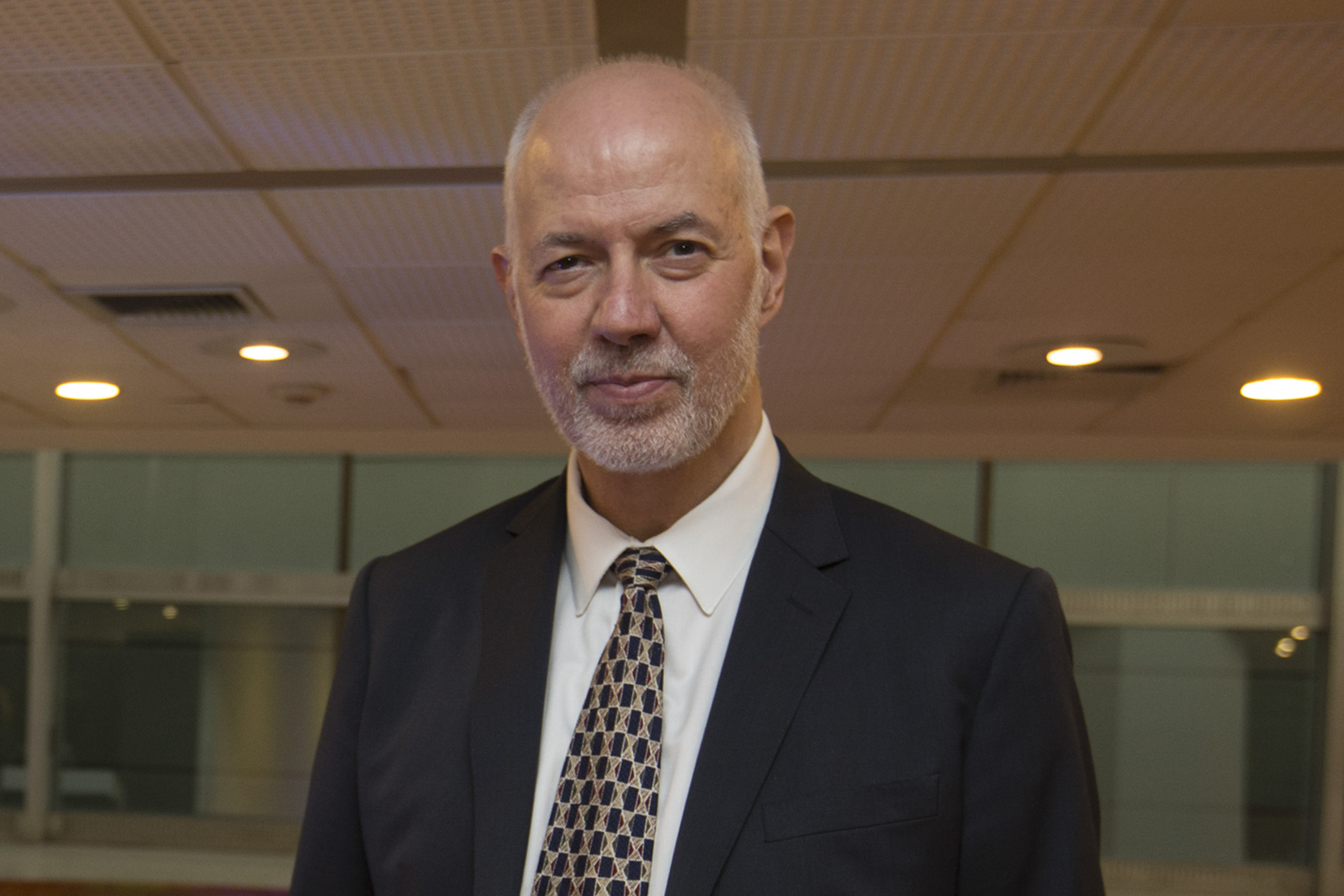

Philosophical work
- Era: Contemporary philosophy
- Region: Western Philosophy
- School: Pragmatism, Analytic
- Main interests: Philosophy of education Critical Theory; Political theory Philosophy of technology

Nicholas C. Burbules is Gutgsell Professor Emeritus of Education Policy, Organization and Leadership from the University of Illinois at Urbana-Champaign. He is the Education Director of the National Center for Principled Leadership and Research Ethics and served as Editor of the journal Educational Theory.

== Education ==
Nicholas Burbules earned a Bachelor of Arts degree in Religious Studies from Grinnell College in 1975, a Master of Arts degree in Philosophy from Stanford University in 1979, and a Doctor of Philosophy degree in Philosophy of Education from Stanford University in 1983.

== Work ==
Nicholas Burbules was a professor in the Department of Education Policy, Organization and Leadership from 1989-2024 at the University of Illinois at Urbana-Champaign.

Prior to his work at the University of Illinois, Burbules was a professor in the Department of Educational Studies at the University of Utah from 1983-1989.

Nicholas Burbules served as Editor of Educational Theory for more than twenty-five years, from 1992-2013, and then again from 2019-2024, helped establish Education Review in 1998, and served as President of the Philosophy of Education Society in 2001. Burbules's publications include seven books, nine edited books, and over 200 journal articles and book chapters on topics including dialogue, ethics, technology, educational research, and critical theory. He helps write a recurring column in Inside Higher Ed.

== Honors and awards ==
- Appointed to Gutgsell Professorship, University of Illinois (2009–2024).
- Recipient, James and Helen Merritt Foundation Award for Outstanding Contributions to the Philosophy of Education (2004).

== Selected publications ==
- Kohli, Wendy; Burbules, Nicholas C. (2012). Feminisms and educational research. Lanham: Rowman & Littlefield Publishers. p. 120. ISBN 9781442214675.
- Peters, Michael A.; Burbules, Nicholas C.; Smeyers, Paul (17 November 2015). Showing and Doing (0 ed.). Routledge. ISBN 978-1-317-25215-3.
- Peters, Michael; Burbules, Nicholas C. (2004). Poststructuralism and Educational Research. Philosophy, Theory, and Educational Research Series. Lanham, MD: Rowman & Littlefield Publishers. ISBN 978-0-8476-9119-7.
- Burbules, Nicholas C.; Phillips, D. C. (2000). Postpositivism and Educational Research. Rowman & Littlefield Publishers. ISBN 978-1-4422-0270-2.
- Burbules, Nicholas C. (1993). Dialogue in Teaching: Theory and Practice. Advances in contemporary educational thought. New York: Teachers College Press. ISBN 978-0-8077-3242-7.
