= Payne Cobblestone House =

Historic house in New York, United States

- U.S. National Register of Historic Places
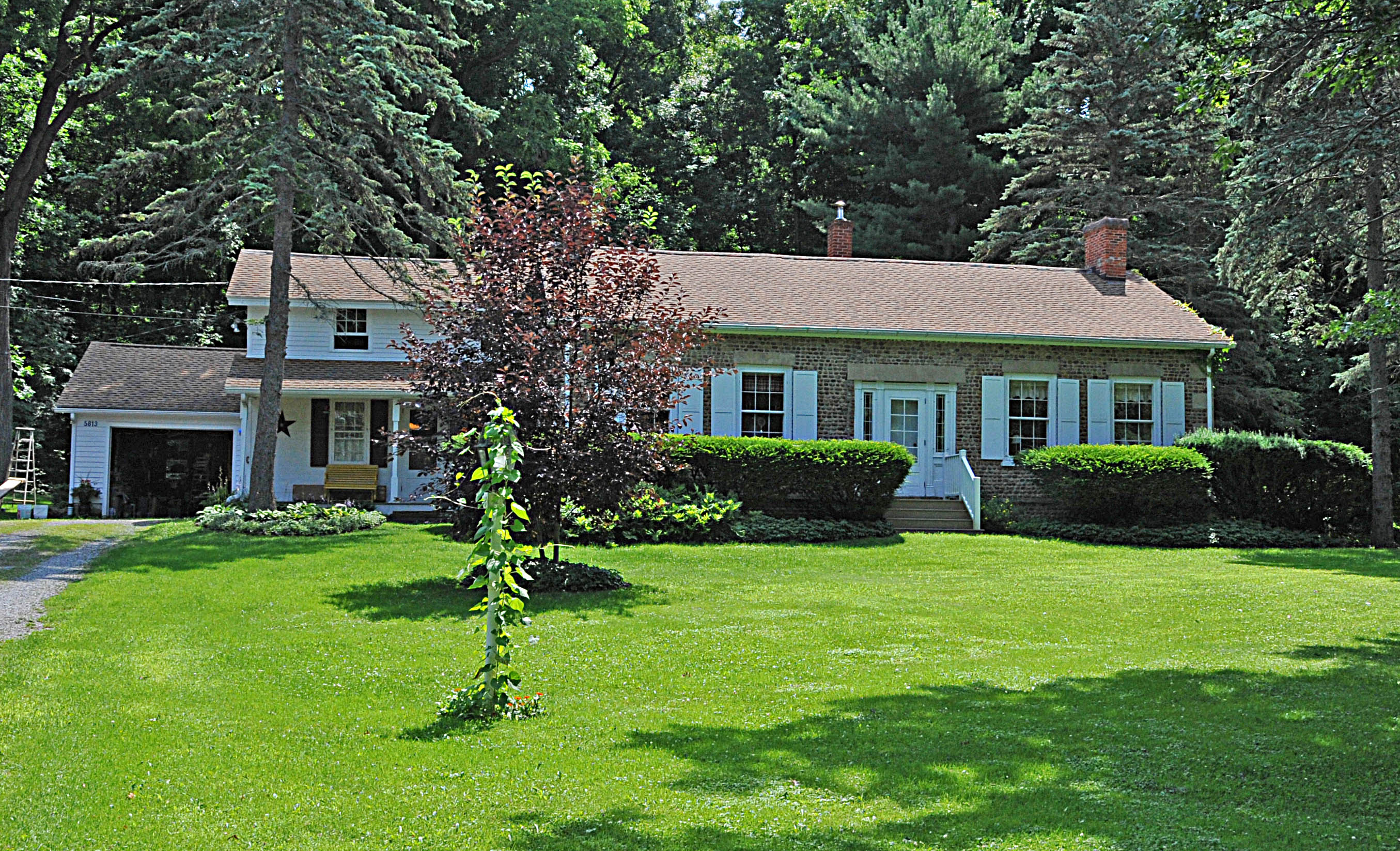

- Location within New York Location within the United States
- Nearest city: Conesus, New York
- Coordinates: 42°44′11″N 77°39′51″W
- Area: less than one acre
- Architectural style: Greek Revival
- MPS: Cobblestone Architecture of New York State MPS
- NRHP reference No.: 06000969
- Added to NRHP: November 01, 2006

Payne Cobblestone House is a historic home located at Conesus in Livingston County, New York. It was constructed in the 1830s and is a vernacular 1-story, five-by-three-bay cobblestone structure with a 1 1/2-story offset frame wing. The interior features some Greek Revival style details. It features medium-sized field cobbles set in horizontal rows in its construction. Also on the property are three contributing structures: a sandstone railroad embankment and culvert built about 1853 and a small barrel vault culvert built to accommodate a small stream.

It was listed on the National Register of Historic Places in 2006.
