= Sliker Cobblestone House =

Historic house in New York, United States

- U.S. National Register of Historic Places
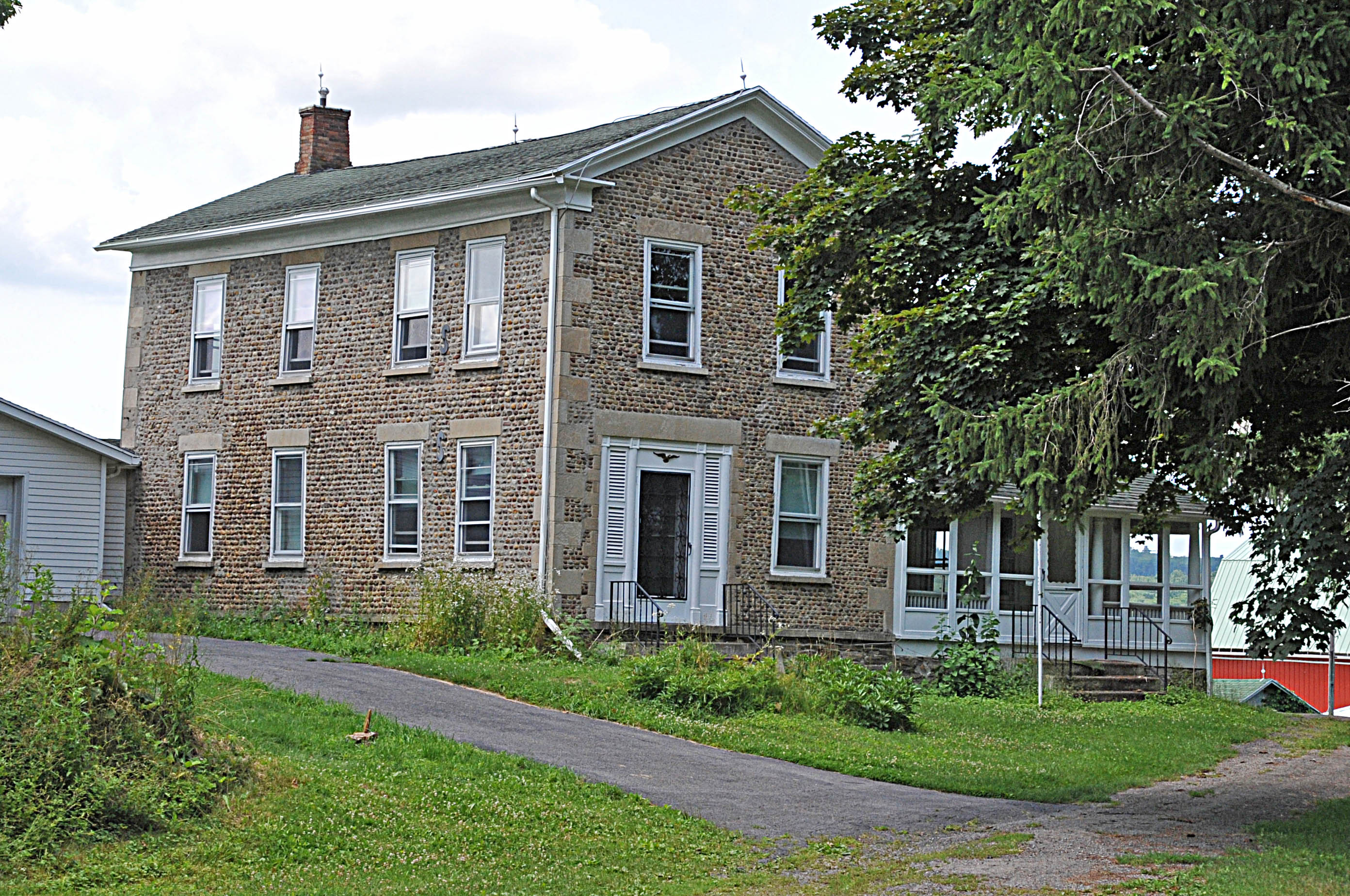

- Location within New York Location within the United States
- Nearest city: Conesus, New York
- Coordinates: 42°42′51″N 77°41′28″W
- Area: 4.7 acres (1.9 ha)
- Architectural style: Federal
- MPS: Cobblestone Architecture of New York State MPS
- NRHP reference No.: 06001300
- Added to NRHP: January 25, 2007

Sliker Cobblestone House is a historic home located at Conesus in Livingston County, New York. It consists of a 1 1/2-story frame structure with a 2-story visually dominant cobblestone portion and 1-story rear shed addition. It features medium-sized field cobbles set in horizontal rows in its construction. The interior features Federal-style details. Also on the property are four contributing outbuildings: a shed, four privies, and a barn dating to about 1900.

It was listed on the National Register of Historic Places in 2007.
