= Lee Cronbach =

American psychologist (1916–2001)

- Born: April 22, 1916; Fresno, California, U.S.
- Died: October 1, 2001 (aged 85); Palo Alto, California, U.S.
- Education: University of California, Berkeley (BS, MS); University of Chicago (PhD)
- Known for: Cronbach's alpha Generalizability theory
- Awards: E. L. Thorndike Award (1967); James McKeen Cattell Fellow Award (2001)
- Scientific career
- Fields: Psychology, Educational Psychology
- Workplaces: Washington State University; University of Chicago; University of Illinois; Stanford University
- Thesis: Individual Differences in Learning to Reproduce Plane Figures (1940)
- Doctoral advisor: Guy Buswell
- Doctoral students: Lawrence Hubert

Lee Joseph Cronbach (April 22, 1916 – October 1, 2001) was an American educational psychologist who made contributions to psychological testing and measurement.

At the University of Illinois, Urbana, Cronbach produced many of his works: the "Alpha" paper (Cronbach, 1951), as well as an essay titled "The Two Disciplines of Scientific Psychology", in the American Psychologist magazine in 1957, where he discussed his thoughts on the increasing divergence between the fields of experimental psychology and correlational psychology (to which he himself belonged).

Cronbach was the president of the American Psychological Association, president of the American Educational Research Association, Vida Jacks Professor of Education at Stanford University and a member of the United States National Academy of Sciences, the American Academy of Arts and Sciences, and the American Philosophical Society. Cronbach is considered to be "one of the most prominent and influential educational psychologists of all time." A Review of General Psychology survey, published in 2002, ranked Cronbach as the 48th most cited psychologist of the 20th century.

== Education and career ==
Born in Fresno, California. His father was a Jewish silk merchant. At the age of 5, he scored 200 on an IQ test, and was later selected to participate in Lewis Terman's long-term study of talented children.

Cronbach graduated from Fresno High School at age 14, but as the family could not afford to send him to a university, he graduated from Fresno State College to become a teacher. He received a bachelor's degree in chemistry and mathematics and later a master's degree from the University of California, Berkeley. Cronbach had an interest in educational and psychological measurement due to Thurstone's work on the measurement of attitudes. This work of Thurstone intrigued Cronbach, motivating him to complete and receive his doctorate in educational psychology from the University of Chicago in 1940.

After teaching mathematics and chemistry at Fresno High School, Cronbach held faculty positions at the State College of Washington (now Washington State University), the University of Chicago, and the University of Illinois, finally settling at Stanford University in 1964. In 1956 he was elected a Fellow of the American Statistical Association.

== Contributions to educational psychology ==
Cronbach's research can be clustered into three main areas: measurement theory, program evaluation, and instruction. This includes several issues, such as the nature of the teaching-learning process, the measurement of variables describing instructional interactions, the evaluation of educational programs, and educational psychology's aspiration as an emerging social science discipline. His contributions to measurement issues were of great importance to all educational psychologists. These contributions included improvements to the technology of psychometric modeling, as well as reformulations, which went beyond the mathematics of understanding the psychology of test performances.

Educational psychologists have benefited from Cronbach's quest for a better explanation of learning in response to instruction; making countless contributions to educational psychology. Cronbach was able to sharpen the sensitivity of educational research, such as how different learners cope with the demands within different learning environments. He advocated the use of extensive local studies and field methods, producing useful narratives of teaching and learning. Cronbach's contributions include refining research questions which seek to understand the person-situation interactions in educational settings, recognizing the abandonment of strict scientism is in favour of a more pluralistic philosophical and empirical agenda, and emphasizing that the role of context is just as essential as improved interpretations of educational processes. Cronbach developed a framework for evaluation design, implementation and analysis. He believed that the purpose of evaluation to provide constructive feedback for program implementers and clients was incorrect. On the contrary, he believed that it was the design, implementation and analysis which should reflect the feedback goal.

Cronbach has proven that research is valuable - to the extent where research serves the purpose of improving some aspect of social reality. This allowed Cronbach to lay out guidelines - much like a road-map - for researchers and practitioners of educational psychology spreading awareness of the challenges and prospects of conducting program evaluations.

"The special task of the social scientist in each generation is to pin down the contemporary facts. Beyond that, [Cronbach] shares with the humanistic scholar and the artist in the effort to gain insight into contemporary relationships, and to align the culture's view of man with present realities. To know man as he is is no mean aspiration."

== Cronbach's alpha ==
Cronbach worked on the concept of reliability which had a huge impact on the field of educational measurement. His earliest work was the publication of Cronbach's alpha a method for determining the reliability of educational and psychological tests. This allowed new interpretations of the index of reliability. Cronbach had created this formula which could be applied throughout a variety of tests and other measurement instruments - gaining an enormous amount of popularity among practitioners. Cronbach's alpha provided a measure of reliability from a single test administration thus showing that on repeated occasions, or even other parallel forms of testing, were not needed to estimate a test's consistency (this followed closely from the works of Kuder and Richardson). Coefficient alpha is useful because not only is it easily calculated, but it is also quite general and can be applied universally - for example: dichotomously scored multiple-choice items or polytimous attitude scales.

== The generalizability theory (the "G" theory) ==
As Cronbach's work on reliability progressed, during the 1950s and 1960s it led to his work on the generalizability theory. He began his work with the aim to produce a handbook on measurement - allowing people to apply mathematical concepts to transform one's behaviours and events into quantitative results. Cronbach believed that there were two flaws in the concept of taking observed test scores into true score and error components: he believed that true scores were "ill-defined" and errors were "all-inclusive". The Generalizability theory addresses the question of the relative influence on test performance based on different aspects of how tests are being administered to people. A question that would be addressed, for example, would be: "will students perform consistently on different occasions?"

The Generalizability theory expanded when Cronbach became concerned that an undifferentiated error term covered up information about systematic variations which could be important in terms of test performance. With this in mind, he teamed up with two other members and developed a "random model" (introduced by the British statistician R.A. Fisher) where he was determined to figure out the complexities of error variance. This "G" theory thus provided a combination of the psychological with the mathematical producing a comprehensive framework and statistical model which identified sources of measurement error.

Cronbach's theory goes beyond examining consistency in a student's relative standing in distribution – it recognizes and acknowledges that the particular item used in any given test is only a small indicator from a wider domain of knowledge. Only such extensions to reliability investigations were made possible by the Generalizability theory - which allowed researchers to address more realistic educational problems, and encouraged researchers to place substantial considerations when they made inquires to demonstrate that validity is important especially when evaluating information extracted from test scores.

With the help from Paul Meehl, Cronbach placed the concept of validity theory in the centre of educational and psychological testing. Cronbach & Meehl believed that "...it [is]imperative that psychologists make a place for [advocating construct validity] in their methodological thinking, so that its rationale, its scientific legitimacy, and its dangers may become explicit and familiar. This would be preferable to the widespread current tendency to engage in what actually amounts to construct validation research and use of constructs in practical testing, while talking an "operational" methodology which, if adopted, would force research into a mold it does not fit." Cronbach acknowledged reliability as an important characteristic of a test, but believed that reliability and validity went hand-in-hand, and at times, 'trade-offs' were necessary in order to improve reliability. The paper, Construct Validity in Psychological Tests, compiled by both Cronbach and Meehl, represents their research efforts for over 50 years on validity.

Educational offices
Preceded by Theodore Newcomb	66th President of the American Psychological Association; 1957–58	Succeeded by Harry Harlow
Preceded by Nathaniel Gage	President of the American Educational Research Association; 1964–1965	Succeeded by Benjamin Bloom
