= Anita Woolfolk Hoy =

American psychologist

Anita Woolfolk Hoy (born October 6, 1947, in Fort Worth, Texas) is an American psychologist who specializes in child education. Hoy was a professor in the college of educational psychology at Ohio State University from 1994 until her retirement in 2012. She is a professor emerita. She has been active in many areas of research and several other scientific works, in which she focuses on students perceptions of teachers, teacher's beliefs, students motivations and the effects of educational psychology when being applied In the classroom. Her text, Educational Psychology, which is in its 13th edition, was recognized as one of the most widely read introductions in the field of psychology.

== Education and career ==
Hoy studied at the University of Texas at Austin, where she minored in chemistry, and received her bachelor's degree in psychology in 1969. Hoy continued studying at the University of Texas at Austin and received a doctorate in educational psychology in 1972. Between 1973 and 1994 she began working in a school in Texas, where she briefly worked as a school psychologist. In 1979, Hoy became a faculty member at Rutgers University graduate school of education, and took on a role in the department of educational psychology, where she was promoted as department chair in 1990 until 1993. In October 1994, Hoy joined the college of education as professor at Ohio State University, and became professor emeritus in January 2013. Hoy has held office titles such as vice president for Division K, and Division 15 in the American Educational Research Association.

== Books ==
Although Hoy has been a rising author of her own novels, she has been a contributor to the book, Educational Psychology: A Century of Contributions. Even though Anita Woolfolk Hoy is her full name, Hoy is known to use the name "Anita Woolfolk" on many of her books.

- --- Hoy, A. W., & Hoy, W. K. (2006). Instructional leadership: a learning-centered guide (1st ed.). Boston: Pearson/A and B.
- --- Woolfolk, A. E. (2008). Educational psychology: active learning edition (10th ed.). Boston: Pearson/Allyn and Bacon.
- --- Hoy, A. W., & Perry, N. E. (2015). Child and adolescent development (1st ed.). Upper Saddle River, NJ: Pearson.

== Selected works ==
- Goddard, Roger D.; Hoy, Wayne K.; Hoy, Anita Woolfolk (2000-01-01). "Collective Teacher Efficacy: Its Meaning, Measure, and Impact on Student Achievement". American Educational Research Journal. 37 (2): 479–507. doi:10.3102/00028312037002479. ISSN 0002-8312. S2CID 6604661.
- Hoy, Anita Woolfolk; Spero, Rhonda Burke (2005-05-01). "Changes in teacher efficacy during the early years of teaching: A comparison of four measures". Teaching and Teacher Education. 21 (4): 343–356. doi:10.1016/j.tate.2005.01.007.
- Hoy, W. K.; Tarter, C. J.; Hoy, A. W. (2006). "Academic Optimism of Schools: A Force for Student Achievement". American Educational Research Journal. 43 (3): 425–446. doi:10.3102/00028312043003425. S2CID 145520458.
