= Orville T. Chamberlain =

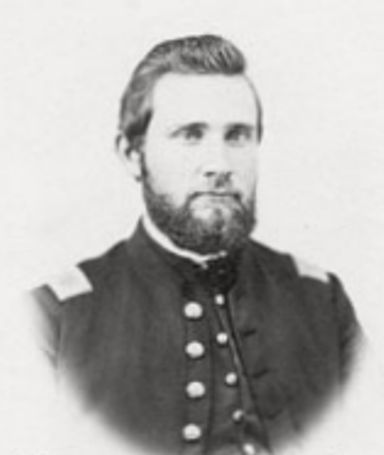
- Born: September 1, 1841; Leesburg, Indiana, US
- Died: May 27, 1929 (aged 87); Prescott, Arizona, US
- Burial place: Elkhart, Indiana, US
- Military career
- Allegiance: United States of America
- Branch: United States Army
- Rank: Second Lieutenant
- Unit: 74th Regiment Indiana Volunteer Infantry - Company G
- Conflicts: Battle of Chickamauga
- Awards: Medal of Honor

Orville Tyron Chamberlain (September 1, 1841, to May 27, 1929) was an American soldier who fought in the American Civil War. Chamberlain received the United States' highest award for bravery during combat, the Medal of Honor, for his action during the Battle of Chickamauga, Georgia, on 20 September 1863. He was honored with the award on 11 March 1896.

== Biography ==
Chamberlain was born in Leesburg, Indiana on September 1, 1841. He enlisted in the 74th Indiana Infantry. He graduated from Notre Dame University in 1868 and became a lawyer. He married Helen Maria Mead (1843-1911), and they had one child, Edith Chamberlain (1872-1933). In 1914, Chamberlain served in Washington as acting commander of the Legion of Valor of the United States of America, and was a proponent of a $10 per month pension addition for Medal of Honor recipients.

He was the first town attorney of Elkhart, Indiana, and subsequently became District Attorney of Indiana's 34th Judicial District.

He died on May 27, 1929, and his remains are interred at the Grace Lawn Cemetery in Elkhart.

== Medal of Honor citation ==
While exposed to a galling fire, went in search of another regiment, found its location, procured ammunition from the men thereof, and returned with the ammunition to his own company.

== See also ==
- List of American Civil War Medal of Honor recipients: A–F
