= Jeremiah Kuder =

- Born: July 12, 1835; Tiffin, Ohio, US
- Died: May 25, 1916 (aged 80)
- Burial place: Marion, Indiana, US
- Military career
- Allegiance: United States of America
- Branch: United States Army
- Rank: Lieutenant
- Units: Company A, 74th Indiana Infantry
- Conflicts: Battle of Jonesborough; American Civil War
- Awards: Medal of Honor

Jeremiah Kuder (July 12, 1835 – May 25, 1916) was an American soldier who fought in the American Civil War. Kuder received the United States' highest award for bravery during combat, the Medal of Honor. Kuder's medal was won for capturing the flag of the actions during the Battle of Jonesborough on September 1, 1864. He was honored with the award on April 7, 1865.

Kuder was born in Tiffin, Ohio, entered service in Warsaw, Indiana, and was later buried at the Marion National Cemetery in Marion, Indiana.

== Medal of Honor citation ==
The President of the United States of America, in the name of Congress, takes pleasure in presenting the Medal of Honor to Lieutenant Jeremiah Kuder, United States Army, for extraordinary heroism on 1 September 1864, while serving with Company A, 74th Indiana Infantry, in action at Jonesboro, Georgia, for capture of flag of 8th and 19th Arkansas (Confederate States of America).

== See also ==
- List of American Civil War Medal of Honor recipients: G–L
