= Morton Hunt =

American psychology and science writer

- Born: February 20, 1920; Philadelphia, Pennsylvania, U.S.
- Died: March 12, 2016 (aged 96)
- Education: Temple University; University of Pennsylvania
- Scientific career
- Fields: Social/behavioural psychology

Morton Magill Hunt (February 20, 1920 – March 12, 2016) was a psychology and science writer who notably wrote for The New Yorker, The New York Times Magazine and Harper's. Educated at Temple University and the University of Pennsylvania, he worked as a freelance writer from 1949, specializing in the social and behavioral sciences; he wrote at least 18 books and more than 450 articles.

== Writings ==
He is the author of several books, including "The Story of Psychology", "The Natural History of Love", "The New Know-Nothings: The Political Foes of the Scientific Study of Human Nature", and "The Universe Within".

In "How Science Takes Stock: The Story of Meta-Analysis" he describes the history of meta-analysis and its early applications. He describes how meta-analysis was first developed by Gene Glass as a way to summarize evidence for psychotherapy. He also describes how in education policy, meta-analysis was initially used by Richard Laine, Larry Hedges and Rob Greenwald to refute the work of Eric Hanushek whose work claimed evidence that spending more money on public schools resulted in no educational improvement.

Hunt died on March 10, 2016.
