= Andrew Kuder =

American soldier (c.1838–1899)

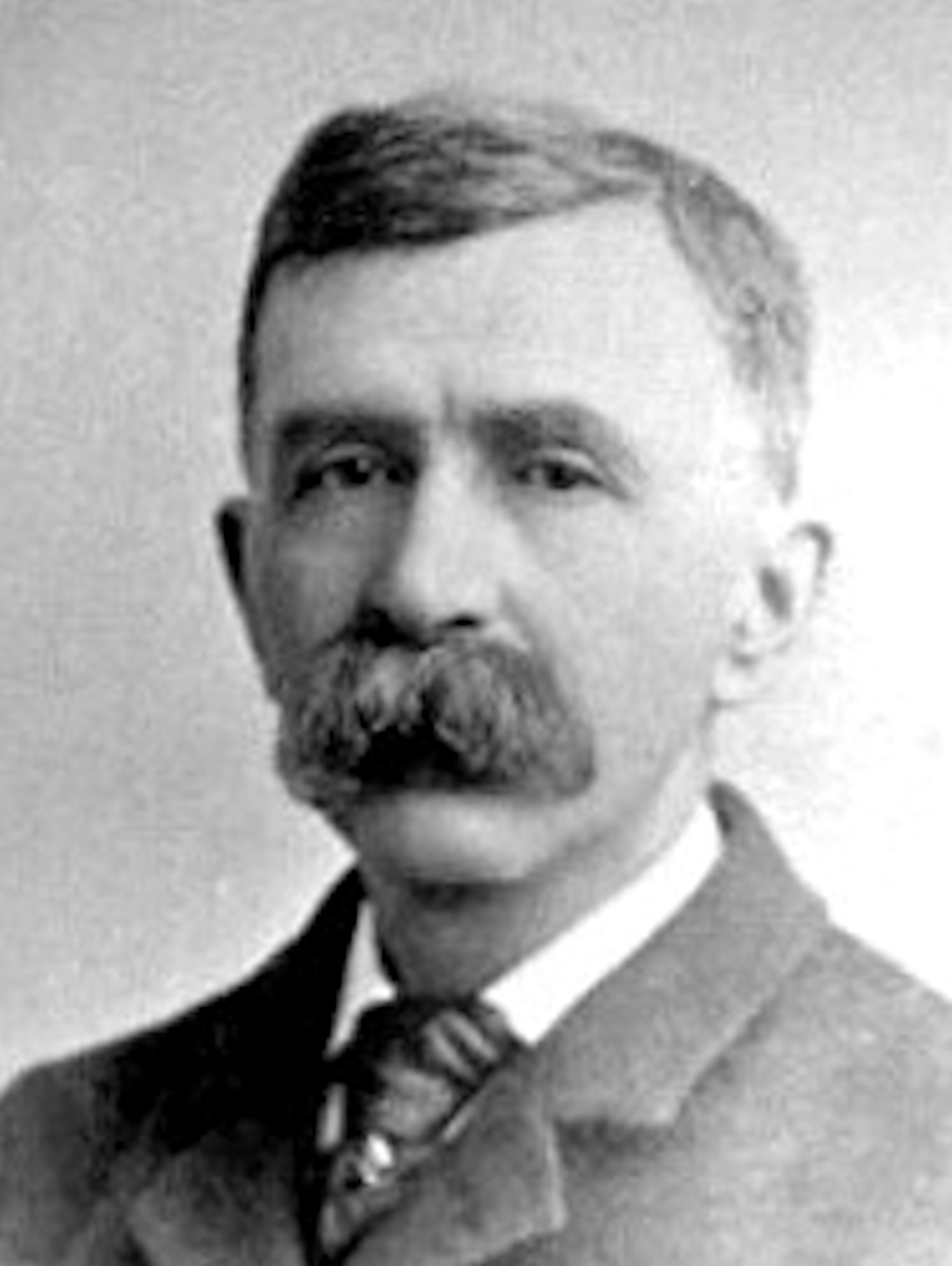
- Born: c. 1838; Groveland, New York, US
- Died: April 30, 1899
- Burial place: Conesus, New York, US
- Military career
- Allegiance: United States of America
- Branch: United States Army
- Rank: Second Lieutenant
- Units: (New York (state)) Company G, 8th New York Cavalry
- Conflicts: Battle of Waynesboro; American Civil War
- Awards: Medal of Honor

Andrew Kuder (c. 1838 – April 30, 1899) was an American soldier who fought in the American Civil War. Kuder received the United States' highest award for bravery during combat, the Medal of Honor. Kuder's medal was won for capturing the flag during the Battle of Waynesboro on March 2, 1865. He was honored with the award on March 26, 1865.

Kuder was born in Groveland, New York, entered service in Rochester, and was buried in Conesus.

== Medal of Honor citation ==
The President of the United States of America, in the name of Congress, takes pleasure in presenting the Medal of Honor to Second Lieutenant Andrew Kuder, United States Army, for extraordinary heroism on 2 March 1865, while serving with Company G, 8th New York Cavalry, in action at Waynesboro, Virginia, for capture of flag.

== See also ==
- List of American Civil War Medal of Honor recipients: G–L
