= Nathaniel Gage =

American educational psychologist (1917–2008)

- Born: Nathaniel Lees Gewirtz; August 1, 1917; Union City, New Jersey, US
- Died: August 17, 2008 (aged 91); Stanford hospital, California, US
- Education: University of Minnesota; Purdue University
- Scientific career
- Institutions: Purdue University; University of Illinois Urbana-Champaign; Stanford University
- Thesis: The relative importance of determinants of opinion concerning minority groups (1947)
- Doctoral advisor: H. H. Remmers
- Other academic advisors: B. F. Skinner
- Doctoral students: David Berliner; Dale Schunk

Nathaniel Lees Gage (August 1, 1917 – August 17, 2008) was an American educational psychologist who made significant contributions to a scientific understanding of teaching. He conceived and edited the first Handbook of Research on Teaching (Gage, 1963), led the Stanford Center for Research and Development of Teaching, and served as president of the American Educational Research Association. Gage was a professor at the Stanford Graduate School of Education, where he moved in 1962 after 14 years at the University of Illinois. Deborah Stipek, dean of the Stanford School of Education, called Gage a "giant among educational researchers." David Berliner, Regents' Professor of Education at Arizona State University, called Gage "the father of the field of research on teaching."

== Education ==
Nathaniel Lees Gewirtz was born in Union City, New Jersey, in 1917, his mother and father were both Polish immigrants; his eventual name change is explained below. Gage graduated from high school in 1934, which was during the Great Depression. He attended the City College of New York and the University of Minnesota. At the University of Minnesota, he worked in the laboratory of B. F. Skinner, who later became famous for his contributions to the theory of behaviorism. Gewirtz's duties included making food pellets used to reinforce the behavior of Skinner's laboratory rats. B. F. Skinner would later publish his theory, including the previous trials of laboratory rats, in numerous journals, including "The Experimental Analysis Of Behavior."

Gewirtz graduated magna cum laude in 1938 with a bachelor's degree in psychology, but was rejected by 10 graduate schools before being admitted to Purdue University. According to David Berliner, the many rejections were due to anti-Semitism. Gewirtz then changed his last name to Gage.

During World War II, Gage spent two years in the Army, where he joined the aviation psychology program and he developed aptitude tests for choosing navigators and radar observers. Gage returned to the university in 1945 and earned a Ph.D. in psychology from Purdue University in 1947. His thesis advisor at Purdue was H. H. Remmers.

== Academic career ==
Gage taught at Purdue for a year, and at the University of Illinois for 14 years. In 1962, Gage became a professor at Stanford University, where he remained until his death. In 1965, Gage co-founded the Stanford Center for the Research and Development in Teaching (now known as the Center for Educational Research at Stanford), funded with a $4 million federal grant.

Gage said that teaching should not only be effective but also respected, according to his colleagues. The way to achieve both of these aspects, according to Gage, was through science. "Teaching is properly done by hunch, by intuition, by experience, by ideology; what it also needs is a basis in scientific research," he explained back in 1987 in his interview for the Stanford News Service.

Gage edited the Handbook of Research on Teaching (1963), and wrote The Scientific Basis of the Art of Teaching (1978) and Hard Gains in the Soft Sciences (1985). His books has been added to numerous Educational Psychology writings." He also contributed numerous research articles in journals throughout the field, including "Confronting Counsels of Despair for the Behavioral Sciences," which was first published in April 1996. He was even published in the Journal of Educational Psychology of the American Psychological Association in March 1955 in a journal titled "Pupils' values and the validity of the Minnesota Teacher Attitude Inventory." He is also referenced in numerous courses across America, including one such as AIU, also known as the Atlantic International University.

Upon his retirement from active teaching in 1987, Gage became a professor emeritus, and still worked at his office five days a week. From 1987 through 2008, he wrote at least three books and more than 20 articles. He completed his last book, A Conception of Teaching, shortly before his death.

His many honors include a Guggenheim fellowship (1976–1977), election to the National Academy of Education (1979), the E. L. Thorndike Award for Career Achievement in Educational Psychology (1986), and an honorary doctorate from the Université de Liège in Belgium (2001).

Gage died on August 21, 2008, at a hospital at the age of 91. At the hospital, he received surgery to remove a blot clot after a head injury from a fall.

== Family ==
Gage married Margaret "Maggie" Burrows Gage in 1942. They had four children. Margaret died two years before Nathaniel in 2006.

Educational offices
Preceded by Walter W. Cook	President of the American Educational Research Association; 1963–1964	Succeeded by Lee Cronbach
