= Mary Lou Fulton College for Teaching and Learning Innovation =

ASU subdivision

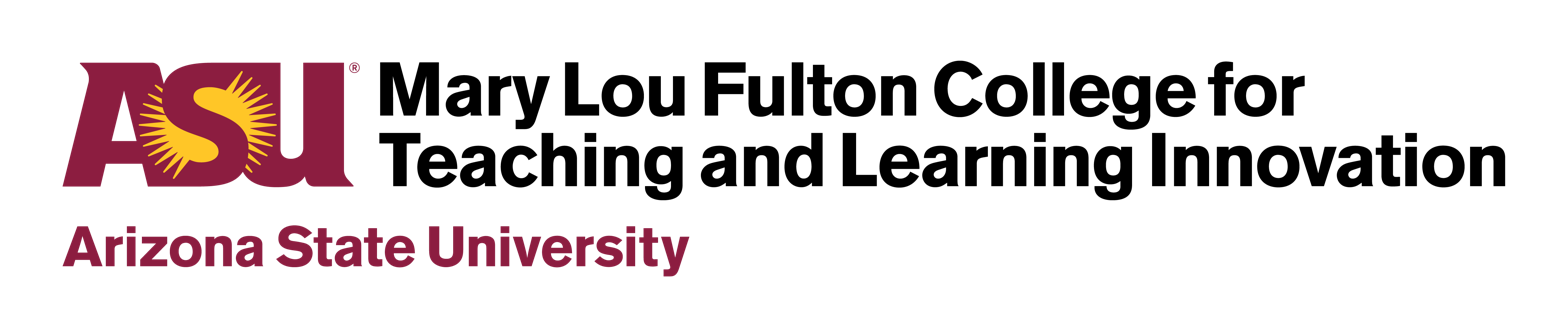
- Type: Public
- Established: 2010
- Dean: Carole Basile
- Location: Multiple Locations, Arizona, U.S. 33°25′08″N 111°56′14″W
- Website: education.asu.edu

Mary Lou Fulton College for Teaching and Learning Innovation administers Arizona State University's undergraduate and graduate programs in education. The college is headquartered on ASU's Tempe campus, but offers programs on all four of ASU's campuses, online and in school districts throughout the state. The college was named for ASU education alumna and successful business woman Mary Lou Fulton.

== History ==
Prior to 2009, ASU maintained three colleges of education: the College of Education (later named Mary Lou Fulton College of Education) at the Tempe campus, the College of Teacher Education and Leadership on the West campus and the School of Educational Innovation and Teacher Preparation on the Polytechnic campus.

In May 2009, ASU's education programs underwent a renaming and reorganization. The Mary Lou Fulton College of Education, which was ASU's original college of education, became the Mary Lou Fulton Institute and Graduate School of Education.[2] This new school focused solely on graduate-level programs and research. All teacher preparation degree programs (including all undergraduate education programs) were consolidated into the College of Teacher Education and Leadership.

A year later, in May 2010, these remaining two education colleges were merged into Mary Lou Fulton Teachers College, which now administers all education programs — graduate and undergraduate — throughout the university.

In 2025, the Mary Lou Fulton Teachers College was renamed the Mary Lou Fulton College for Teaching and Learning Innovation.

== Ranking ==
Mary Lou Fulton Teachers College at Arizona State University is ranked 13th in the U.S. among all public and private graduate schools of education, No. 7 among public universities and No. 15 in online programs by U.S. News & World Report (2021). Six of the college's online master’s degrees are among the top five in the nation in their specialty areas, according to the U.S. News & World Report 2021 Best Online Graduate Education Programs rankings. These honors made MLFTC the only college of education in the country to rank in the USNWR top 15 in both on-campus and online graduate education degrees. MLFTC is also ranked highly — #6 — for Best Online Master’s in Education Program for Veterans.

Rankings for the school continue to climb, from 35th in 2012. In the Academic Ranking of World Universities, Mary Lou Fulton Teachers College is ranked No. 10 in the world for its education degrees (2019). In 2015, U.S. News & World Report listed ASU as one of the fastest rising top-tier colleges of education in the U.S. in a 5-year span.

The Academic Ranking of World Universities (Shanghai) ranked the college No.10. MLFTC secondary education programs, both undergraduate (2017) and graduate (2018), are ranked in the 99th percentile by the National Council on Teacher Quality, while the college's undergraduate special education program is ranked No. 1 by the NCTQ (2014).

The magazine, Diverse: Issues in Higher Education, gave Mary Lou Fulton Teachers College high rankings for universities that award master's, doctoral and professional degrees to underrepresented minority students. The college was ranked 8th for Native American doctorates in education, 13th for Asian American master's in education, 10th for Native American master's in education and 19th for Hispanic master's in education.

== Programs ==
Mary Lou Fulton Teachers College has two divisions: Teacher Preparation, and Educational Leadership and Innovation. The college emphasizes teacher education, community service and academic research. A full spectrum of degree programs include BAE, MEd, MA, MPE, EdD and PhD in fields such as early childhood education, elementary education, secondary education, special education, physical education, and educational administration and supervision. The college also offers advanced study and research in school leadership, curriculum and instruction, school and educational psychology, education policy, education technology, higher and post-secondary education.

== Strategic Initiatives ==
The college focuses on four strategic initiatives: 1. Their educator prep program is an integral part of their Educator Workforce Initiative, which aims to redesign and prepare the education workforce to meet the needs of 21st-century learners. 2. Community Design Labs that facilitate the collaborative design, prototyping and testing of solutions to touch education problems in schools. 3. Contextual Model Implementation that works with strategic education, funding and policy partners to implement effective models of the most promising prototypes generated. 4. Usable Knowledge Creation, which generates team-based, cross-disciplinary research that improves education.

In the fall 2014, Mary Lou Fulton Teachers College launched its Center for Advanced Studies in Global Education.

== Notable staff ==
- David Berliner, psychologist
- Michelene Chi, cognitive scientist
- James Paul Gee, sociolinguist
- Gene V. Glass, statistician
- K. Tsianina Lomawaima, researcher of Indigenous studies, anthropology, history, and political science

== Awards ==
In 2014, Mary Lou Fulton Teachers College received the TAP Award of Distinction in recognition of its dedication and commitment to advancing educator effectiveness.
