= Gene V. Glass =

American statistician

Gene V Glass
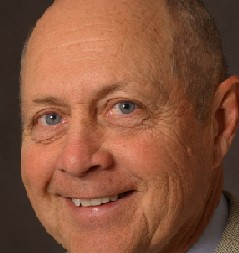
- Gene V Glass (2010)
- Born: June 19, 1940 (age 86); Lincoln, Nebraska
- Citizenship: United States
- Known for: Developing the statistical method "Meta-analysis"
- Spouse(s): Sandra Jo Rubin (m. 1993); Mary Lee Smith (m. 1977); Sharon Lea Grossoehme (m. 1959)

Academic background
- Education: University of Nebraska (1962); University of Wisconsin–Madison (1965)
- Thesis: Resolution of Infallible Variables into Common Factors and Principal Components (1965)

Academic work
- Institutions: University of Wisconsin–Milwaukee (1963-65); University of Wisconsin–Madison (1965); University of Illinois at Urbana–Champaign (1965–67); University of Colorado Boulder (1967–86); Arizona State University (1986–2010); San Jose State University (2013–2019)

Gene V Glass (born June 19, 1940) is an American statistician and researcher working in educational psychology and the social sciences. According to the science writer Morton Hunt, he coined the term "meta-analysis" and illustrated its first use in his presidential address to the American Educational Research Association in San Francisco in April, 1976. The most extensive illustration of the technique was to the literature on psychotherapy outcome studies, published in 1980 by Johns Hopkins University Press under the title Benefits of Psychotherapy by Mary Lee Smith, Gene V Glass, and Thomas I. Miller. Gene V Glass is a Regents' Professor Emeritus at Arizona State University in both the educational leadership and policy studies and psychology in education divisions, having retired in 2010 from the Mary Lou Fulton Institute and Graduate School of Education. From 2011 to 2020, he was a senior researcher at the National Education Policy Center, a research professor in the School of Education at the University of Colorado Boulder, and a lecturer in the Connie L. Lurie College of Education at San Jose State University. In 2003, he was elected to membership in the National Academy of Education.

== Background ==
Glass was born in Lincoln, Nebraska and educated in the Lincoln Public School system, graduating from Lincoln Northeast High School in 1958. He attended Nebraska Wesleyan University from 1958 to 1960 and the University of Nebraska from 1960 to January, 1962, earning a bachelor's degree with a joint major in mathematics and German. He worked as a research assistant for Robert E. Stake at UNL from spring 1961 until graduation. At Stake's suggestion, he chose to immediately enroll in graduate school. He entered the PhD program in statistics, measurement and experimental design at the University of Wisconsin, Madison in February 1962. He graduated with a PhD in Educational Psychology in May, 1965, having studied with Julian C. Stanley, Chester W. Harris, and Henry F. Kaiser. His doctoral dissertation, entitled Alpha Factor Analysis of Infallible Variables, won the Creative Talent award in Psychometrics given by the American Institutes for Research for 1966. In August 1965, he joined Stake and other colleagues as an assistant professor in the Center for Instructional Research and Curriculum Evaluation at the University of Illinois at Urbana–Champaign, where he taught for two years before moving to the University of Colorado Boulder. He was promoted to professor at CU-Boulder in 1970. In 1986, Glass joined the faculty of the Arizona State University in Tempe, Arizona, from which he retired in 2010. He holds the title of Regents' Professor Emeritus from Arizona State University. In 2011, he joined the faculty of the School of Education at the University of Colorado Boulder as a research professor. He has served as a senior researcher in the National Education Policy Center since 2011. From 2015 to 2019, he served as a lecturer in the Connie L. Curie College of Education at San José State University.

== Contributions ==
In 1970, he published his first book, Statistical Methods in Education and Psychology, with his adviser Julian C. Stanley as co-author. The book, which was started in 1964 while Glass was still a graduate student, went through three editions, the most recent having been published in 1996 with Kenneth D. Hopkins as co-author. In all, as of 2010 his professional résumé lists some 23 books and more than 250 articles, reviews and reports.

His scholarly contributions are divided into three periods: 1964–1974 statistical methods including contributions to factor analysis and meta-analysis; 1975–1985 psychotherapy outcome research; 1986–2010 education policy analysis. In addition, Glass has been an active editor of scholarly journals: 1968–1970 Review of Educational Research, 1978–1980 Psychological Bulletin (Editor for Methodology), 1984–1986 American Educational Research Journal (Co-Editor with Mary Lee Smith and Lorrie A. Shepard). In recent years he has championed the cause of open access to scholarly literature, having created in 1993 the ("free-to-read") online journal Education Policy Analysis Archives and in 1998 the multi-lingual online book review journal Education Review, both of which journals are Diamond Open Access (free-to-read & free-to-publish).

In 2006, he was honored with the Distinguished Contributions to Educational Research Award of the American Educational Research Association. In 2008, he published Fertilizers, Pills & Magnetic Strips: The Fate of Public Education in America in which contemporary education debates are seen as the result of demographic and economic trends throughout the 20th Century. In 2014, Glass co-authored with David C. Berliner the book 50 Myths and Lies That Threaten America's Public Schools.

One type of effect size estimator, g, was named after Glass by Larry V. Hedges.

== Awards and honors ==
- Delta Phi Alpha, German Honorary Society, 1962
- Creative Talent Award of American Institutes for Research for Best Dissertation in Psychometrics in 1964–65
- Palmer O. Johnson Award (for best article in yearly volume of the American Educational Research Journal; 1968 and 1970)
- Fellow of Divisions 5 and 15 of the American Psychological Association, 1975
- President, American Educational Research Association, 1975
- Best Contracted Evaluation Study of Division H of the Amer. Educ. Res. Assoc., 1977
- Cattell Award of Society of Multivariate Experimental Psychology, 1980
- Lazarsfeld Award; Evaluation Research Society, 1984
- Fellow of the American Psychological Society, Elected 1990
- Alumni Achievement Award, School of Education, University of Wisconsin–Madison, 1990
- Lifetime Achievement Award of the Arizona Educational Research Organization, 1998
- Distinguished Alumni Award, Teachers College, University of Nebraska–Lincoln, 1998
- Phi Delta Kappa, Education Honorary Society, 1998
- Honorary Member of the Centre for Evidence-Based Mental Health, Dept. of Psychiatry, Oxford University, England, 1999
- Fellow, Education Policy Project, Center for Educational Research, Analysis & Innovation, University of Wisconsin, Milwaukee, 1999–2001
- Member, National Academy of Education, 2000
- AERA Distinguished Contributions to Research in Education Award, 2005
- Arizona Arts, Sciences and Technology Academy, Founding Fellow, 2005
- Outstanding Book Award (with Charalambos Vrasidas) of the Division of Teacher Education of the Association for Educational Communications and Technology, 2006
- Distinguished Alumnus, Lincoln (NE) Northeast High School, Awarded May 25, 2007
- Fellow, American Educational Research Association, Elected 2008
- Fellow, National Education Policy Center, School of Education, University of Colorado at Boulder (2010–present)
- Outstanding Public Educator" for 2016, awarded by the Horace Mann League.

== Selected publications ==
=== Books ===
- Glass, Gene V & Stanley, Julian C. (1970). Statistical Methods in Education & Psychology. Englewood Cliffs, N.J.: Prentice-Hall.
- Glass, G. V (Ed.) Proceedings of the 1970 Invitational Conference on Testing Problems. Princeton, N.J.: Educational Testing Service, 1971.
- Glass, G. V & Stanley, J.C. (1974). Metodos Estadisticos Aplicados a las Ciencias Sociales. Englewood Cliffs, N.J.: Prentice-Hall.
- Glass, G. V; Willson, V.L. & Gottman, J.M. (1975). Design and Analysis of Time-series Experiments. Boulder, Colo.: Colorado Associated University Press.
- Glass, G.V (Ed.) (1976). Evaluation Studies Review Annual, Vol. 1. Beverly Hills: SAGE Publications.
- Hopkins, K.D. & Glass, G.V (1978). Basic Statistics for the Behavioral Sciences. Englewood Cliffs, N.J.: Prentice-Hall.
- Smith, Mary Lee; Glass, Gene V; & Miller, Thomas I. (1980). The Benefits of Psychotherapy. Baltimore, MD: Johns Hopkins Univ. Press.
- Glass, Gene V; McGaw, Barry; & Smith, Mary Lee. (1981). Meta-analysis in Social Research. Beverly Hills, CA: SAGE.
- Glass, Gene V; Cahen, Leonard S.; Smith, Mary Lee & Filby, Nikola N. (1982). School Class Size: Research and Policy. Beverly Hills, CA: SAGE.
- Smith, M.L. & Glass, G.V (1987). Research and Evaluation in Education and the Social Sciences. Englewood Cliffs, NJ: Prentice-Hall.
- Glass, Gene V & Hopkins, Kenneth D. (1996). Statistical Methods in Education & Psychology, Third Edition. Boston: Allyn & Bacon.
- Vrasidas, C. and Glass, G.V (Eds.) (2002). Distance Education and Distributed Learning. Greenwich, CT: Information Age Publishing.
- Vrasidas, C. and Glass, G.V (Eds.) (2004). Online Professional Development for Teachers. Greenwich, CT: Information Age Publishing.
- Vrasidas, C. and Glass, G.V (Eds.) (2005). Preparing Teachers to Teach with Technology. Greenwich, CT: Information Age Publishing.
- Glass, Gene V. (2008). Fertilizers, Pills & Magnetic Strips: The Fate of Public Education in America. Charlotte, NC: Information Age Publishing.
- Glass, G.V; Willson, V.L. & Gottman, J.M. (2008). Design and Analysis of Time-series Experiments. Charlotte, NC: Information Age Publishing.
- Berliner, David C.; Glass, Gene V & Associates. (2014). 50 Myths & Lies that Threaten America's Public Schools. NY: Teachers College Press.
- Cobb, C.D. & Glass, G.V (2021). Public and private education in America: Examining the facts. Santa Barbara, CA: ABC-CLIO.
