= David Berliner =

American psychologist (1938–2025)

David Charles Berliner (March 15, 1938 – September 26, 2025) was an American educational psychologist. He was a professor and dean of the Mary Lou Fulton Institute and Graduate School of Education.

== Life and career ==
Berliner was born in New York City on March 15, 1938. After a B.A. in psychology from UCLA and an M.A. in psychology from California State University at Los Angeles, Berliner received a Ph.D. in Educational Psychology from the Stanford Graduate School of Education under the supervision of Nathaniel Gage. He also was awarded Doctorates of Humane Letters, Honoris Causa, from the University of Massachusetts Amherst and Manhattanville College. He is the father to a son and a daughter.

Berliner authored more than 400 articles, books and chapters in the fields of educational psychology, teacher education, and educational policy, including the best-seller The Manufactured Crisis (co-authored with B.J. Biddle) and six editions of the textbook Educational Psychology (co-authored with Nathaniel L. Gage). He also co-authored Putting Research to Work in your School with his wife, Ursula Casanova, Collateral Damage: How High-stakes Testing Corrupts American Education with S.L. Nichols, and edited the Handbook of Educational Psychology (with R.C. Calfee), Perspectives on instructional Time (with C. Fisher).

Berliner was a past president of the American Educational Research Association, and of the Division of Educational Psychology of the American Psychological Association. Berliner was a Regents' Professor Emeritus of Education at Arizona State University. Among other honors he was an elected member of the National Academy of Education, the International Academy of Education, and a fellow (1988) of the Center for Advanced Study in the Behavioral Sciences. He is the winner of the E.L. Thorndike award in educational psychology, the distinguished contributions award of the American Educational Research Association, the Outstanding Public Communication of Education Research Award (American Educational Research Association, 2016), the Friend of Education award of the NEA, and the Brock International Prize for Distinguished contributions to education.

Berliner died on September 26, 2025, at the age of 87.

Cultural offices
Preceded by Lee Shulman	President of the American Educational Research Association; 1985–1986	Succeeded by Lauren Resnick
