= National Academy of Education =

Nonprofit, non-governmental organization in the United States

The National Academy of Education (NAEd) is a nonprofit, non-governmental organization in the United States that advances high-quality research to improve education policy and practice. Founded in 1965, the NAEd currently consists of over 300 elected regular members, international associates, and emeriti. Members and international associates are elected based on the outstanding scholarship related to education and provide pro-bono service on committees that provide advice to policymakers and practitioners on pressing issues in education. In addition, Academy members and other scholars are also deeply engaged in NAEd’s professional development programs focused on preparing the next generation of education researchers. Since 1986, NAEd has administered the NAEd/Spencer Postdoctoral Fellowship Program, and since 2011, NAEd has administered the NAEd/Spencer Dissertation Fellowship Program, both funded by The Spencer Foundation.

== Leadership ==
The National Academy of Education is governed by a nine-member board of directors. Current President of the Academy is Alfredo J. Artiles.

=== Past Presidents ===
- 1965-1969 Ralph W. Tyler
- 1969-1973 Lawrence A. Cremin
- 1973-1977 Patrick Suppes
- 1977-1981 Stephen Bailey
- 1981-1985 Robert Glaser
- 1985-1989 Patricia Albjerg Graham
- 1989-1993 Lee Shulman
- 1993-1997 Carl F. Kaestle
- 1997-1998 Ann L. Brown
- 1998-2001 Ellen Condliffe Lagemann
- 2001-2005 Nel Noddings
- 2005-2009 Lorrie A. Shepard
- 2009-2013 Susan Fuhrman
- 2013-2017 Michael J. Feuer
- 2017-2021 Gloria Ladson-Billings
- 2021-2025 Carol D. Lee
- 2025-present Alfredo J. Artiles

== Research initiatives and publications ==
=== Current research initiatives ===
- Evaluating and Improving Teacher Preparation Programs
- Educating for Civic Reasoning and Discourse
- Study on the Implementation and Use of Balanced Assessment Systems
- Addressing Educational Inequities in the Wake of the COVID-19 Pandemic

=== Examples of recent and featured reports ===
- Reaping the Rewards of the IES Reading for Understanding (RfU) Initiative (2020)
- Study on Comparability of Large-Scale Educational Assessments (2020)
- Big Data: Balancing Research Needs and Student Privacy (2017)
- Reaping the Rewards of Reading for Understanding (2020)
- Methods and Policy Uses of International Large-Scale Assessments (2018)
- Global Migration, Diversity, and Civic Education: Improving Policy and Practice (2016)
- Past as Prologue: The National Academy of Education at 50. Members Reflect. (2015)
- Workshop to Examine Current and Potential Uses of NCES Longitudinal Surveys by the Education Research Community (2014)
- Evaluation of teacher preparation programs: Purposes, methods, and policy options (2013)
- Adaptive Educational Technologies: Tools for Learning, and for Learning About Learning (2013)
- Getting Value Out of Value-Added: Report of a Workshop (2010)

== Current NAEd members ==
=== Members ===
Deborah Ball
Michael McPherson
David Figlio
Na’ilah Nasir
Susan Fuhrman
Donna Shalala
Adam Gamoran
Morty Schapiro
Henrietta Mann
James Spillane
Kent McGuire
Deborah Stipek
Bruce Alberts
James D. Anderson
Alexander Astin
Ron Avi Astor
Richard Atkinson
Thomas Bailey
Eva Baker
Deborah Loewenberg Ball
James A. Banks
W. Steven Barnett
Hyman Bass
Randy Bennett
David Berliner
Marina Bers
Hilda Borko
Henry Braun
Jeanne Brooks-Gunn
John Brown
Anthony Bryk
Eamonn Callan
Prudence Carter
Stephen J. Ceci
P. Lindsay Chase-Lansdale
Michelene T.H. Chi
Paul Cobb
Marilyn Cochran-Smith
David Cohen
Michael Cole
James P. Comer
Lambros Comitas
William Damon
Linda Darling-Hammond
Andrea diSessa
Greg Duncan
Jacquelynne Eccles
Margaret Eisenhart
Richard Elmore
Frederick Erickson
Michael Feuer
Robert Floden
Sarah Freedman
Susan Fuhrman
Adam Gamoran
Patricia Gandara
Howard Gardner
James Paul Gee
Carol Gilligan
Susan Goldman
Louis Gomez
Thomas Good
Edmund Gordon
Sandra Graham
Hanna Holborn Gray
Pamela Grossman
John Guthrie
Kris Gutiérrez
Amy Gutmann
Edward Haertel
Kenji Hakuta
Eric Hanushek
Robert M. Hauser
Shirley Brice Heath
Larry V. Hedges
Jeffrey Henig
Joan Herman
Andrew Ho
Paul Holland
Glynda Hull
Jacqueline Irvine
Kirabo Jackson
Jack Jennings
Susan Johnson
Carl Kaestle
Sharon Kagan
David Kaplan
James Kelly
Walter Kintsch
David L. Kirp
Michael W. Kirst
David Klahr
Daniel Koretz
Deanna Kuhn
Helen Ladd
Gloria Ladson-Billings
Ellen Condliffe Lagemann
Magdalene Lampert
Sara Lawrence-Lightfoot
Carol Lee
Valerie Lee
Richard Lehrer
Hope Leichter
Henry Levin
Richard Light
Marcia Linn
Judith Warren Little
Susanna Loeb
K. Tsianina Lomawaima
Dan Lortie
Henrietta Mann
Kathleen McCartney
Lorraine Mcdonnell
Milbrey Mclaughlin
Douglas Medin
Hugh Mehan
Deborah Meier
John W. Meyer
Jeffrey Mirel
Robert Mislevy
Elizabeth Moje
Luis Moll
Pamela Moss
Richard Murnane
Anna Neumann
Sonia Nieto
Nel Noddings
Pedro Noguera
Jeannie Oakes
Michael Olivas
Gary Orfield
Annemarie Sullivan Palincsar
Roy Pea
David Pearson
James Pellegrino
David Perkins
Paul Peterson
Penelope Peterson
Andrew C. Porter
Alejandro Portes
Sophia Rabe-Hesketh
Stephen Raudenbush
Diane Ravitch
Sean Reardon
William J. Reese
Fernando Reimers
Lauren Resnick
Barbara Rogoff
Mike Rose
Cecilia Rouse
Brian Rowan
Robert Rueda
Rubén G. Rumbaut
Russell Rumberger
Geoffrey Saxe
Marlene Scardamalia
Leona Schauble
William Schmidt
Barbara Schneider
Alan Schoenfeld
Robert Schwartz
Donna Shalala
Lorrie Shepard
Robert S. Siegler
Judith Singer
Diana Slaughter Kotzin
Robert Slavin
Marshall Smith
Catherine E. Snow
Daniel G. Solórzano
Margaret Beale Spencer
James Spillane
Claude Steele
Robert Sternberg
James Stigler
Deborah Stipek
Carola Suárez-Orozco
Marcelo Suárez-Orozco
William F. Tate IV
David S. Tatel
Marta Tienda
William G. Tierney
Judith Torney-Purta
Guadalupe Valdes
Deborah Vandell
Maris Vinovskis
Matthias von Davier
Noreen Webb
Bernard Weiner
Lois Weis
Roger Weissberg
Amy Stuart Wells
Clifton Wharton
Carl Wieman
John Willett
William Julius Wilson
Mark Wilson
Suzanne Wilson
Sam Wineburg
Carol Camp Yeakey
Hirokazu Yoshikawa
Kenneth Zeichner

=== Members emeriti ===
Anthony Alvarado
Richard C. Anderson
Isabel Beck
Carl Bereiter
Derek Bok
John D. Bransford
John Seely Brown
Martin Carnoy
Courtney Cazden
Daryl Chubin
Charles T. Clotfelter
Allan M. Collins
K. Patricia Cross
Larry Cuban
Robert Dreeben
Ronald G. Ehrenberg
Edgar Epps
Elizabeth Fennema
David P. Gardner
Howard Gardner
Herbert Ginsburg
Gene V. Glass
Patricia Graham
James Heckman
Jeremy Kilpatrick
Judith Lanier
Marvin Lazerson
Robert Levine
James G. March
Wilbert J. McKeachie
Robert Moses
Harold J. Noah
Denis Phillips
Thomas A. Romberg
Sheldon Rothblatt
Richard Shavelson
Lee Shulman
Kenneth Strike
Finis Welch

=== International associates ===
- Rami Benbenishty
- Michael Fullan
- David Olson
- Manabu Sato
- Anna Sfard
- Yossi Shavit
- J. Douglas Willms

=== International associates emeriti ===
- Paul Black
- Erik De Corte
- Kieran Egan
- Guy Neave
- Sidney Strauss
