= Subini Annamma =

American academic

- Occupation: Special Education Teacher
- Board member of: Critical Educators for Social Justice SIG; Race Ethnicity and Education

Academic background
- Education: University of Colorado Boulder (MA, PhD); University of Wisconsin, Oshkosh (BS)
- Thesis: Resistance and Resilience: The Education Trajectories of Young Women of Color with Disabilities through the School to Prison Pipeline (2013)
- Doctoral advisor: Janette K. Klingner

Academic work
- Discipline: Sociologist
- Sub-discipline: Restorative Justice; Educational Inequality; Intersectionality; Sociology of Education; Disability studies; Black Feminist Sociology; Urban Education; Critical Race Theory; Ethnic studies
- Institutions: Stanford University; University of Kansas; Indiana University
- Notable ideas: Dis/ability Critical Race Studies (DisCrit)
- Website: Official Website

Subbini Annamma is an American academic who is a professor of education, and sociologist. She is Associate Professor of Education at Stanford University Graduate School of Education.

She is a pioneering researcher in Dis/ability Critical Race Studies (DisCrit).

Her areas of research include sociology of education, critical race theory, disability studies, intersectional justice in education, ethnic studies, carceral logics, school-to-prison pipeline, restorative justice, Black feminist sociology, educational inequality, and special education in the United States.

Annamma identifies as a "multi-racial Black and Asian woman of color" and as "disabled [and] chronically ill."

== Education ==
Annamma completed her BS in Special education in 2002 at University of Wisconsin–Oshkosh. She has a MA in special education and English as a second language (2008) and a PhD in educational equity, cultural diversity, and "social, multicultural, and bilingual foundations."

== Academia ==
Annamma began her career as a special education teacher in California, Oregon, and Colorado, working both in public schools and youth detention centers.

Annamma worked as an assistant professor from 2013 to 2014 at Indiana University-Indianapolis. Also in 2014, she began working as a Postdoctoral Fellow at the University of Denver. After leaving the University of Denver in 2015, Annamma became an assistant professor at the University of Kansas where she worked until 2019.

In 2019, Annamma began working as an associate professor at Stanford University Graduate School of Education. She was awarded the Ford Foundation Postdoctoral Fellowship the same year. The dean of the School of Education said "The Ford Foundation Fellowship is wonderful recognition of the important work Dr. Annamma is doing on incarceration issues for students of color with disabilities... This fellowship will give her a full year to continue her research in this area of growing significance.”

In 2024, she was a Scholar in Service for the Stanford Impact Labs and was awarded a Research and Innovation Grant from the Stanford Accelerator for Learning for her project "Whose expertise matters? Centering Youth Voice to (Re)Conceptualize and Expand Accessibility in Ethnic Studies." Annamma designed an accessible ethnic studies curriculum for the San Francisco Unified School District.

Annamma is the Senior Fellow and Faculty Lead in Education at the Stanford Center for Racial Justice. She co-leads the Roses Talk Project – a project designed to include student voices in equitable education policy – with the Center.

Annamma is a co-director of the Stanford University Center for Comparative Studies in Race and Ethnicity Walk Out! Lab For Youth Justice with Law Professor Ralph Richard Banks.

In 2024, Annamma developed the Formerly Incarcerated Research Experts (FIRE) Fellowship. The six-month fellowship allows formerly incarcerated researchers to work with Annamma in researching the races and disabilities of incarcerated youth or developing their own research project.

== Writing ==
Annamma has edited and written five books. Her book The Pedagogy of Pathologization: Dis/abled Girls of Color in the School-prison Nexus was awarded the American Educational Studies Association Critics Choice Book Award and the National Women's Studies Association Alison Piepmeier Book Prize.

In a review for the London School of Economics and Political Science, Allison Stein wrote that The Pedagogy of Pathologization "in its findings and methods will serve as a model for future researchers who seek an intersectional view of the school-prison nexus that puts the voices of those being criminalised and pathologised at the front and centre." For Teachers College Record, reviewers Shereka King and Abiola Farinde-Wu wrote that "Through the lens of DisCrit, The Pedagogy of Pathologization: Dis/abled Girls of Color in the School-Prison Nexus is a powerful qualitative research study that highlights the experiences of girls of color who fight against hyper-surveillance, hyper-labeling, and hyper-punishment within prison nation... Annamma achieved her goal in this in-depth exploration of the lived experiences of incarcerated multiply-marginalized dis/abled girls of color."

Annamma's book DisCrit: Disability Studies and Critical Race Theory in Education was included in Thompson's "Black Disabled Woman Syllabus."

For the Educational Review, Fulbright Schuman Visiting Scholar Valentina Migliarini described DisCrit as "an exciting and ground-breaking volume addressing the root of some of the most entrenched educational inequities within Western culture from an intersectional and cross-disciplinary lens, while creating spaces for solidarity and new alliances in education policies and practices." They added that Annamma's 2013 article "Dis/ability critical race studies (DisCrit): theorizing at the intersections of race and dis/ability" was "invaluable in developing my doctoral research project on the disablement of refugee children in the Italian context." In Disability Studies Quarterly, reviewer Phil Smith began by writing "This book. SO much to like. SO much good energy." While his review was positive, he did highlight that the book was "dense, academic" and "over-focused."

Annamma has served on the editorial board of Race Ethnicity and Education and Focus on Exceptional Children. She has also worked as an editor for Multiple Voices for Ethnically Diverse Exceptional Learners.

Annamma has had journal articles published in the Educational Researcher, Race Ethnicity and Education, NYU Review of Law & Social Change's The Harbinger, International Journal of Qualitative Studies in Education, Teachers College Record, and more. Annamma has also been featured on Disability Visibility Project.

She wrote an article for Teen Vogue on the intersectional criminalization of disabled Black girls with Rep. Ayanna Pressley and advocate Vilissa Thompson. The article tied into Rep. Pressley's Ending PUSHOUT Act. She has also written articles for Insider Higher Ed, Los Angeles Times, and The Imprint.

== Publications ==
=== Books ===
- Annamma, Subini A. (2016). Ferri, Beth A.; Connor, David J. (eds.). DisCrit: Disability Studies and Critical Race Theory in Education. Teachers College Press. ISBN 978-0-8077-5667-6.
- Morrison, Deb; Annamma, Subini Ancy; Jackson, Darrell D., eds. (April 11, 2017). Critical Race Spatial Analysis: Mapping to Understand and Address Educational Inequity. Stylus. ISBN 978-1620364246.
- Annamma, Subini Ancy (November 14, 2017). The Pedagogy of Pathologization. Routledge. ISBN 978-1138696907.
- Annamma, Subini Ancy; Ferri, Beth A.; Connor, David J., eds. (February 25, 2022). DisCrit Expanded: Inquiries, Reverberations & Ruptures. Teachers College Press. ISBN 978-0807766347.
- Ferri, Beth A.; Connor, David J.; Annamma, Subini Ancy, eds. (October 9, 2024). Enacting Disability Critical Race Theory. Routledge. ISBN 978-1032461601.

=== Selected chapters ===
- Annamma, Subini Ancy (2017). "Cartographies of Inequity". In Morrison, D; Annamma, Subini Ancy; Jackson, D (eds.). Critical Race Spatial Analysis: Mapping to Understand and Address Educational Inequity. Virginia: Stylus. pp. 32–50.
- Annamma, Subini Ancy; Ferri, B; Connor, D (2018). "Cultivating and expanding DisCrit (Disability Critical Race Theory)". Manifestos for the Future of Critical Disability Studies. Vol. 1. Ashgate Publishing. pp. 230–238.
- Migliarini, V; Annamma, Subini Ancy (2019). "Applying Disability Critical Race Theory (DisCrit) in the Practice of Teacher Education in the United States". In Lampert, J (ed.). Oxford Research Encyclopedia of Education. Oxford University Press.
- Annamma, Subini Ancy (2021). "Too Intersectional: What Black Feminism and Disability Studies Can Build Together". In Luna, Zakiya; Pirtle, Whitney (eds.). Black Feminist Sociology: Perspectives and Praxis. ISBN 9781041016120.

=== Selected articles ===
- Annamma, S; Connor, D; Ferri, B (2013). "Dis/Ability Critical Race Studies (DisCrit): Theorizing at the Intersection of Race and Dis/Ability". Journal of Race, Ethnicity and Education. 16 (1): 1–31. doi:10.1080/13613324.2012.730511.
- Annamma, Subini Ancy; Morrison, Deb; Jackson, Darrell (2014). "Disproportionality Fills in the Gaps: Connections Between Achievement, Discipline, and Special Education in the School-to-Prison Pipeline". Berkeley Review of Education. 5 (1): 53–87. doi:10.5070/B85110003.
- Annamma, Subini Ancy (2016). "Disrupting the carceral state through education journey mapping". International Journal of Qualitative Studies in Education. 29 (9): 1210–1230. doi:10.1080/09518398.2016.1214297.
- Annamma, Subini Ancy (2018). "Mapping Consequential Geographies in the Carceral State: Education Journey Mapping as a Qualitative Method With Girls of Color With Dis/abilities". Qualitative Inquiry. 24 (1): 20–34. doi:10.1177/1077800417728962.
- Annamma, Subini Ancy; Ferri, Beth A.; Connor, David J. (April 5, 2018). "Disability Critical Race Theory: Exploring the Intersectional Lineage, Emergence, and Potential Futures of DisCrit in Education". Review of Research in Education. 42 (1): 46–71.
- Annamma, Subini Ancy; Winn, Maisha (25 Jul 2019). "Transforming Our Mission: Animating Teacher Education through Intersectional Justice". Theory into Practice. 58. doi:10.1080/00405841.2019.1626618.
- Annamma, Subini Ancy; Anyon, Yolanda; Joseph, Nicole M.; Farrar, Jordan; Greer, Eldridge; Downing, Barbara; Simmons, John (2019). "Black Girls and School Discipline: The Complexities of Being Overrepresented and Understudied". Urban Education. 54 (2): 211–242. doi:10.1177/0042085916646610.
- Annamma, Subini Ancy; Handy, Tamara (2020). "Sharpening Justice Through DisCrit: A Contrapuntal Analysis of Education". Educational Researcher. doi:10.3102/0013189X20953838.
- Connor, David J.; Ferri, Beth A.; Annamma, Subini Ancy (2021). "From the Personal to the Global: Engaging with and Enacting DisCrit Theory Across Multiple Spaces". Race Ethnicity and Education. 24 (5): 597–606. doi:10.1080/13613324.2021.1918400.
- Love, Hailey R.; Nyegenye, Sylvia N.; Wilt, Courtney L.; Annamma, Subini Ancy (2021). "Black families' resistance to deficit positioning: addressing the paradox of black parent involvement". Race Ethnicity and Education. 24 (5): 637–653. doi:10.1080/13613324.2021.1918403.
- Wilt, Courtney L.; Annamma, Subini Ancy; Wilmot, Jennifer M.; Nyegenye, Sylvia N.; Miller, Amanda L.; Jackson, Elizabeth E. (2022). "Performing color-evasiveness: A DisCrit analysis of educators? discourse in the U.S". Teaching and Teacher Education: 117. doi:10.1016/j.tate.2022.103761.
- Annamma, Subini Ancy; Boveda, M (2023). "Beyond Making a Statement: An Intersectional Framing of the Power and Possibilities of Positioning". Educational Researcher. doi:10.3102/0013189X231167149.
- Cabral, B; Annamma, Subini Ancy; Morgan, J (2023). ""When You Carry a Lot": The Forgotten Spaces of Youth Prison Schooling for Incarcerated Disabled Girls of Color". Teachers College Record. 125 (5): 95–113. doi:10.1177/01614681231181816.
- Annamma, Subini Ancy; Cabral, Brian; Harvey, Brianna; Wilmot, Jennifer M.; Le, Annie; Morgan, Jamelia (September 12, 2023). ""When We Come to Your Class … We Feel Not Like We're in Prison": Resisting Prison-School's Dehumanizing and (De)Socializing Mechanisms Through Abolitionist Praxis". American Educational Research Journal. 61 (1): 3–47. doi:10.3102/00028312231198236 – via Sage Journals.

== Awards and honors ==
Year(s)	Work	Award	Awarding Organization
2019	The Pedagogy of Pathologization	Alison Piepmeier Book Prize	National Women's Studies Association
2020	The Pedagogy of Pathologization	Critics Choice Book Award	American Educational Studies Association
