= Kris Gutiérrez =

American professor of education

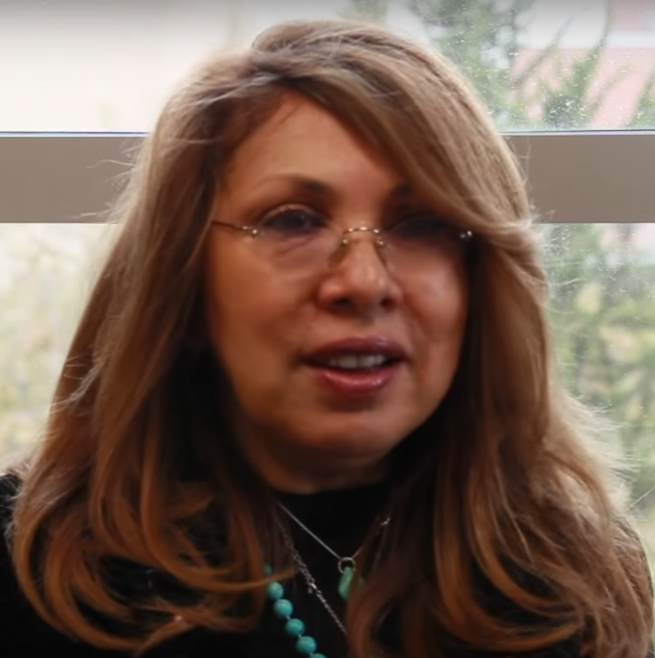
- Occupation: Professor
- Title: Carol Liu Chair in Educational Policy

Academic background
- Education: Arizona State University (M.A.); University of Colorado Boulder (Ph.D.)

Kris D. Gutiérrez is an American professor of learning sciences and literacy. She currently holds the Carol Liu Chair in Educational Policy at the University of California, Berkeley and formerly held the Inaugural Provost's Chair at University of Colorado, Boulder. She is professor emerita of the University of California, Los Angeles. She has specialized in "culture and learning in urban schools," according to the Los Angeles Times. She is a member of the National Academy of Education. In April 2020, Gutiérrez was elected as a member of the American Academy of Arts and Sciences.

== Biography ==
Gutiérrez grew up in Miami, Arizona. Her father worked in a nearby copper mine. Gutiérrez earned her master's degree from Arizona State University and earned her Ph.D. from the University of Colorado Boulder.

She started working in the education department of the University of California, Los Angeles (UCLA) in 1989. She earned the 1997 Distinguished Teaching Award from UCLA. At UCLA she helped create a computer learning club for elementary students and worked on the Migrant Student Leadership Institute for students from the migrant farm-working community. Students from the Migrant Student Leadership Institute were more likely to apply to college and be accepted than a control group. Gutiérrez also studied the effects of Proposition 227 in California in three different school districts after the law was passed in 1998.

When President Barack Obama was transitioning to the White House, she was part of the transition team. In 2012, Obama appointed her to the board of directors of the National Board for Education Sciences.

Gutiérrez earned the C Sylvia Scribner Award in 2005 from the American Educational Research Association (AERA). She earned the 2007 Distinguished Scholar Award from the Committee on Scholars of Color in Education. In 2009, Hispanic Business Magazine listed her as one of the top 100 influential Hispanic people in the United States. Also in 2009, she became the president-elect of AERA.

In 2014 Gutiérrez was awarded a Lifetime Achievement Award from AERA. The Same year, she was honored with the Henry T. Trueba Award for Research Leading to the Transformation of the Social Contexts of Education.

She has been published in Educational Researcher, Mind, Culture, and Activity, Harvard Educational Review, Reading Research Quarterly, Theory Into Practice, Linguistics and Education, Language Arts, Review of Research in Education, Research in the Teaching of English, the Journal of Teacher Education, and other publications.
