= AERA =

AERA or Aera may refer to:

- Aera (magazine), a Japanese weekly magazine
- Airports Economic Regulatory Authority, an Indian regulatory agency
- American Educational Research Association, a professional research organization
- American Educational Resources Association, an education resources organization
- American Equal Rights Association, a social equality organization that existed during the 1860s
- Ancient Egypt Research Associates, a non-profit organization founded by Mark Lehner
- Aera Energy, an American oil company

== See also ==
- Era
- ERA (disambiguation)
