= Daniel G. Solórzano =

American educator and researcher

- Education: Loyola Marymount University (BA); Claremont Graduate University (MA, PhD)
- Occupations: Professor of Social Science and Comparative Education and Chicana/o and Central American Studies
- Employer: University of California, Los Angeles
- Organization(s): National Academy of Education, American Educational Research Association

Dr. Daniel G. Solórzano is an American educator and researcher, known for his work in critical race theory, racial microaggressions, microaffirmations, and critical spatial analysis. Dr. Solorzano has authored more than 100 research articles, book chapters, and books on issues related to educational access and equity for underrepresented student populations and communities in the United States. His work and research as an interdisciplinary scholar are ongoing and considered highly influential, with over 12,500 citations and counting.

== Early life and education ==
Solórzano grew up in Los Angeles, CA. He earned his Ph.D. in the Sociology of Education in 1986, and his M.A. in Educational Policy in 1983 from Claremont Graduate University. He received his M.Ed. in Urban/Multicultural Education in 1974 and B.A. in Sociology and Chicano Studies in 1972 from Loyola Marymount University. In a 2024 interview on the Cultural Humility Podcast, Solórzano described himself as a first-generation college student.

== Career ==
Solórzano has worked in education for around 50 years. His early research studied how scholars of color, specifically Chicana/o scholars, encountered marginalization and racism in spaces of higher education as they pursued their doctorate programs. Solórzano's research and teaching interests with critical race theory examines the relationships between race, power and education and the ways inequality and systemic racism work. He was influenced by the work of Chester M. Pierce, who coined the term "microaggression" in 1970.

Solórzano founded the Center for Critical Race Studies in Education at University of California, Los Angeles (UCLA) in 2015 along with a group of graduate students, and serves as the director of the center.

Solórzano is known for his mentorship and was honored with the inaugural Revolutionary Mentor Award from the American Educational Research Association's (AERA) Social Justice Special Interest Group in 2017.

Solórzano has taught at UCLA for 33 years and is a professor in the UCLA Graduate School of Education & Information Studies, Department of Education and the College of Social Sciences, Department of Chicana/o and Central American Studies. He has also taught at the Los Angeles County Juvenile Hall, the California Community College, the California State University and the University of California systems. He also led the University of California All Campus Consortium on Research for Diversity (UC/ACCORD) as director from 2008 to 2015.

Solórzano is co-editor of the anthology The Chicana/o Education Pipeline: History, Institutional Critique and Resistance, which presents a historical overview of the Chicana/o experience in the education pipeline from the 1880s to 2015. The essays selected for the anthology were originally published in Aztlán: A Journal of Chicano Studies, the oldest Chicana/o journal in the U.S.

== Selected awards and recognition ==
- AERA Council, 2022
- Elected Member, National Academy of Education, 2020
- Distinguished Alumni Award, Claremont Graduate University, 2021
- AERA Distinguished Lecture on Racial Microaggressions, 2019
- Revolutionary Mentor Award, Social Justice Special Interest Group, American Educational Research Association, 2017
- Fellow, American Education Research Association, 2014
- Mildred Garcia Exemplary Scholarship Award, Association for Studies in Higher Education (ASHE), 2013
- Social Justice in Education Award, American Education Research Association (AERA), 2012
- Derrick A. Bell Legacy Award, Critical Race Studies in Education Association, 2012
- UCLA Distinguished Teacher Award, 2007

== Selected publications ==
- Racial Microaggressions: Using Critical Race Theory to Respond to Everyday Racism (2020)
- Covarrubias, A., Nava, P., Lara, A., Burciaga, R., & Solorzano, D. (2019). “Expanding Educational Pipelines: Critical Race Quantitative Intersectionality as Transactional Methodology.” In J. DeCuir-Gunby, T. Chapman, & P. Schutz (eds.), Understanding Critical Race Research Methods: Lessons From the Field(pp. 138–149). New York: Routledge.
- Velez, V. & Solorzano, D. (2019). “Critical Race Cartographies: Exploring Map-Making as Anti-Racist Praxis.” In J. DeCuir-Gunby, T. Chapman, & P. Schutz (eds.), Understanding Critical Race Research Methods: Lessons From the Field(pp. 150–165). New York: Routledge.
- Perez Huber, L. & Solorzano, D. (2015). “Racial Microaggressions as a Tool for Critical Race Research.” Race, Ethnicity, and Education, 18, 297-320.
- Gaxiola Serrano, T. & Solorzano, D.(2018). “The Role of Interest Convergence in California's Education: Community Colleges, Latinas/os and the State's Future.” In A. De Los Santos, G., Keller, R. Tannenbaum, & A. Acereda (eds.), Hispanic Students Move Forward: Assessment, Development, and Achievement(pp. 117–140). Albany, NY: State University of New York Press.
- Giraldo, L., Huerta, A., & Solorzano, D. (2018). “From Incarceration to Community College: Funds of Knowledge, Community Cultural Wealth, and Critical Race Theory.” In J. Marquez Kiyama& Rios-Aguilar (eds.), Funds of Knowledge in Higher Education: Honoring Students’ Cultural Experiences and Resources as Strength(pp. 48–65). New York: Routledge.
- Mares Tamayo, M. & Solorzano, D. (eds.). (2018). The Chicana/o Education Pipeline: History, Institutional Critique, and Resistance. Los Angeles, CA: UCLA Chicano Studies Research Center Press.
- Perez Huber, L., Gonzalez, L. & Solorzano, D. (2018). “Considerations for Using Critical Race Theory and Critical Content Analysis: A Research Note.” Understanding and Dismantling Privilege,8, 9-26.
- Perez Huber, L. & Solorzano, D. (2018). “Teaching Racial Microaggressions: Implications of Critical Race Hypos for Social Work.” Journal of Ethnic & Cultural Diversity in Social Work, 27, 54-71.
- Solorzano, D. (2018). “Why Racial Microaggressions Matter? How I Came to Answer that Question and Why I Do the Work I Do.” In L. Perna (ed.), Taking it to the Streets: The Role of Scholarship in Advocacy and Advocacy in Scholarship(pp. 92–99). Baltimore, MD: Johns Hopkins University Press.
- Acevedo-Gil, N, Santos, R., Alonso, L., & Solorzano, D. (2015). “Latinas/os in Community College Developmental Education: Increasing Moments of Academic and Interpersonal Validation.” Journal of Hispanic Higher Education, 14, 101–127.
- Perez Huber, L. & Solorzano, D. (2015). “Visualizing Everyday Racism: Critical Race Theory, Visual Microaggressions, and the Historical Image of Mexican Banditry.” Qualitative Inquiry, 21, 223-238.
- Solórzano, Daniel and Yosso, TJ. "Critical race methodology: Counter-storytelling as an analytical framework for education research." Qualitative Inquiry, vol. 8, no.1, 2002, pp. 23–44.
- Solórzano, Daniel, Ceja, Miguel, Tara Yosso. "Critical race theory, racial microaggressions, and campus racial climate: The experiences of African American college students." Journal of Negro education, 2000, pp. 60–73.
- Solórzano, Daniel and Delgado Bernal, Dolores. "Examining transformational resistance through a critical race and LatCrit theory framework: Chicana and Chicano students in an urban context." Urban education, vol. 36, no. 3, 2001, pp. 308–342.
