= Barbara Schneider (sociologist) =

American sociologist and education scholar

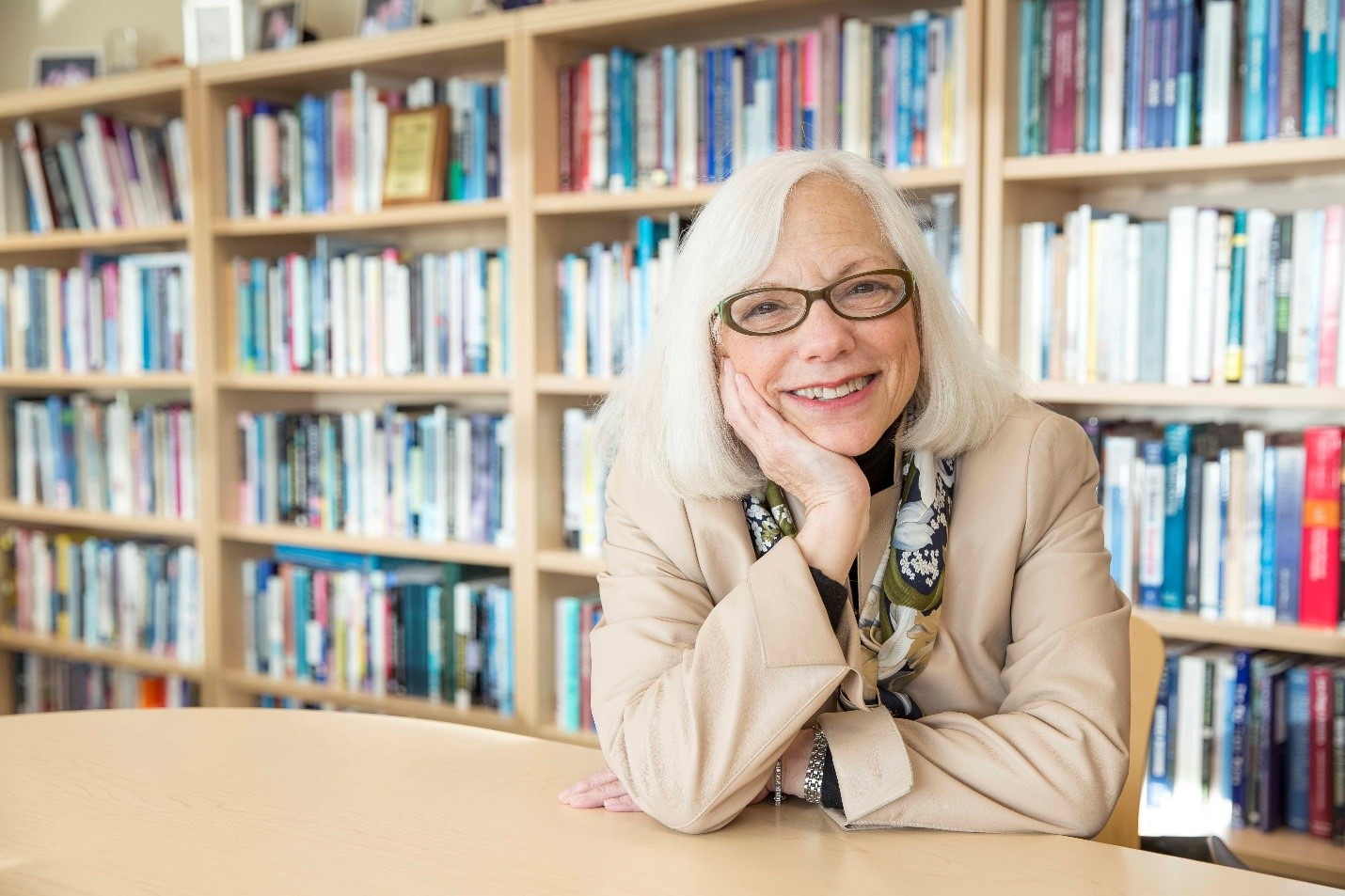
- Born: June 9, 1946 (age 80)
- Spouse: Lewis Schneider

Academic background
- Education: BS, Sociology, 1967, MS, 1976, National Louis University; PhD, 1979, Northwestern University
- Thesis: Production analysis of gains in achievement (1979)

Barbara Lynn Schneider (born June 9, 1946) is an American sociologist and education scholar. She is the John A. Hannah Chair and University Distinguished Professor in the College of Education and Department of Sociology at Michigan State University (MSU).

== Early life and education ==
Schneider was born on June 9, 1946. Growing up, Schneider missed much of her schooling due to illness and struggled academically. She earned her Bachelor of Arts degree and Master's degree from National Louis University and her PhD from Northwestern University.

== Career ==
Upon completing her PhD, Schneider became an assistant professor at Northwestern University School of Education and Social Policy before leaving to become a research associate at the Ogburn-Stouffer Center for the Study of Population and Social Organization at the University of Chicago. She was brought to the University of Chicago after sociologist Jim Coleman became aware of her research on the effects of family, schools, and communities on students learning and achievement. He collaborated with Schneider on a major study with the new National Education Longitudinal Study of 1988.

Schneider stayed at the University of Chicago, serving as director of the Data Research and Development Center and co-director of the Alfred P. Sloan Center on Parents, Children, and Work, until 2005. She left to join the faculty at Michigan State University (MSU) as the John A. Hannah Chair in the College of Education and the Department of Sociology. During her first year at MSU, she was appointed editor of the Sociology of Education journal by the American Sociological Association. In 2008, Schneider was named the inaugural director of MSU's "Center for Advancing Research and Communication in Science, Technology, Engineering and Mathematics" and received a five-year grant from the National Science Foundation. The following year, she was the recipient of a $1 million federal grant to create a program designed to encourage high-schoolers for technical careers in STEM (science, technology, engineering and math courses) called the College Ambitions Program (CAP). Schneider also collaborated with researchers at Bar-Ilan University to gather data on working mothers and fathers which found that working mothers were more likely to multitask. In recognition of her academic research, Schneider was the recipient of the 2011 Elizabeth G. Cohen Distinguished Career in Applied Sociology of Education Award from the American Educational Research Association.

During the 2011–12 academic term, Schneider was appointed a Distinguished University Professor by MSU, the highest rank that can be bestowed on a faculty member by the university. She was also named the co-editor of the November 2011 edition of The ANNALS of the American Academy of Political and Social which focused on work, family and workplace flexibility. At the end of the academic year, Schneider was voted president-elect of the American Educational Research Association starting in 2013. In her role as president of the American Educational Research Association, Schneider was elected a Fellow of the American Association for the Advancement of Science for her "distinguished contributions to the fields of sociology and education, particularly for advancing knowledge of children’s socialization and development and evaluating educational policy and success.”

Schneider continued to research and study education policy while also leading the College Ambition Program, earning her an election to the National Academy of Education. In November 2017, Schneider received a $1.3 million grant from the National Science Foundation to help more low-income and minority high school students enroll in college. She was also the recipient of an honorary degree from the University of Helsinki "based on her many contributions to understanding adolescent development and improving teaching and learning through research." Two years later, Schneider was selected to edit a select volume of the "Handbook of the Sociology of Education in the 21st Century."

In 2020, Schneider published her newest book Learning Science: The Value of Crafting Engagement in Science Environments, which discussed the successfulness of a new project-based learning model between students in Finland and the United States. She was also named one of the top influencers in education policy by Rick Hess' 2020 Edu-Scholar Public Influence Rankings.

== Selected publications ==
- Parents, Their Children, And Schools (1993)
- The Ambitious Generation (1999)
- Becoming Adult (2000)
- Claiming the Future: Youth And Careers in Science, Mathematics And Technology (2006)
- Learning Science: The Value of Crafting Engagement in Science Environments (2020)

== Personal life ==
Schneider and her husband Lewis Schneider had two daughters together.
