= Henry Levin (economist) =

Henry M. Levin is an education economist and the William Heard Kilpatrick Professor of Economics and Education at Columbia University's Teachers College. Moreover, he is the co-director of the Center for Benefit-Cost Studies in Education (CBCSE) and the director of the National Center for the Study of Privatization in Education (NCSPE). Levin has been elected to the National Academy of Education and has received the American Educational Research Association's Distinguished Contributions to Research in Education Award for his research on the impact of markets and competition on the effectiveness of schools and the cost of inadequate education.

== Biography ==
Henry M. Levin has earned a B.S. in marketing and economics from New York University in 1960, followed by an M.A. and a Ph.D. in economics from Rutgers University in 1962 and 1967. After his graduation, Levin became an assistant professor of education and economics at Stanford University before being promoted to associate professor in 1969, to full professor in 1975 and becoming the David Jacks Professor of Higher Education and Economics in 1992. In 1999, Levin emerited from Stanford. While at Stanford, he directed the Institute for Research on Educational Finance and Governance (1969-75), the Center for Educational Research (1975-99), and founded the Accelerated Schools project. Since his emeritation from Stanford in 1999, Levin has been the William Heard Kilpatrick Professor of Economics and Education and the director of the National Center for the Study for Privatization in Education at Columbia University's Teacher's College. Additionally, he has also co-directed the Center for Benefit-Cost Studies in Education after 2007.

Levin performs editorial duties for, among others, the Peabody Journal of Education, Economics of Education Review, Journal of Education and Work, Urban Review, and American Behavioral Scientist and has done so in the past for e.g. the American Educational Research Journal and the Review of Educational Research. He has worked as a consultant for the U.S. Department of Education, National Science Foundation, OECD, and World Bank.

== Research ==
Henry M. Levin is specialized on the economics of education and human resources, urban economics, public finance and education policy. More specifically, he has researched cost effectiveness approaches to evaluation, school finance, the relationship between education and inequality, market-based approaches to education, and accelerated schools for at-risk students.

== Selected Publications ==
- Levin, Henry M. (1972). The costs to the nation of inadequate education. Vol. 2. US Government Printing Office.
- Levin, Henry M. (1979). Economic democracy, education, and social change. Vol. 79. Center for Educational Research at Stanford.
- Levin, Henry M. (1981). Education and organizational democracy. Institute for Research on Educational Finance and Governance, School of Education, Stanford University.
- Levin, Henry M. (1982). Education and work. Vol. 82. Institute for Research on Educational Finance and Governance, School of Education, Stanford University.
- Jackall, Robert; Levin, Henry M. (eds.) (1984). Worker Cooperatives in America. University of California Press.
- Levin, Henry M.; Rumberger, Russell W. (1995). "Education, work". Educational planning: The international dimension. Vol. 1032, no. 2. Taylor & Francis. p. 69.
- Belfield, Clive R.; Levin, Henry M. (2007). The price we pay: Economic and social consequences of inadequate education. Brookings Institution Press.
- Levin, Henry M. (2012). "Reconstructing education in America". Research on schools, neighborhoods, and communities: Toward civic responsibility. Rowman & Littlefield. pp. 217–232.
- Seymour, Mike; Levin, Henry M. (2015). Educating for humanity: Rethinking the purposes of education. Routledge.
