= Henry Braun (statistician) =

American statistician

Henry I. Braun is an American statistician. He is the Boisi Professor of Education and Public Policy and Education Research at the Boston College Lynch School of Education and Human Development. He is also a world-renowned expert on education and public policy, specializing in important topics such as inequality in education including Black-White achievement gap, educator accountability and value-added modeling, large-scale assessments, the role of literacy in economic and social welfare etc.

Henry Braun received his bachelor’s degree in 1970 from McGill University and his master’s and doctoral degrees from Stanford University in 1972 and 1974, respectively. He joined Princeton University as an Assistant Professor, Department of Statistics, in 1973. He joined Educational Testing Service in 1979 and worked in various positions at the company, rising up to the position of Vice President for Research Management in 1990. In 2007, he joined Boston College as the Boisi Professor of Education and Public Policy.

Henry Braun received the Career Contributions Award from the National Council on Measurement in Education in 2023. The American Educational Research Association (AERA) conferred Henry Braun with the Robert L. Linn Distinguished Address Award in 2018, the E. F. Lindquist award in 2021, and the Palmer Johnson Award in 1986. He is a recipient of the National Council for Measurement in Education's 1999 Award for Outstanding Technical Contribution to the Field of Educational Measurement. Henry Braun was elected a fellow of the American Statistical Association in 1991 and of American Educational Research Association in 2008. Henry Braun was elected to the National Academy of Education in 2017 and to the American Academy of Arts and Sciences in 2023.

He has co-authored or co-edited multiple books including "Meeting the challenges to measurement in an era of accountability" and "The dynamics of opportunity in America: Evidence and perspectives". He is currently a member of technical advisory committees for the states of Arkansas, Georgia, Massachusetts, and New Hampshire, as well as the Partnership for the Assessment of Readiness for College and Careers (PARCC). He serves in advisory roles for the College Board, the Organisation for Economic Co-operation and Development (OECD) and the International Association for the Evaluation of Educational Achievement (IEA), as well as the National Institute for Testing and Evaluation in Israel. He has published more than 100 journal articles, research reports, and white papers on various topics. In 2000, Henry Braun was granted a patent for a computer-based simulation of architectural practice.
