= Michael Feuer =

Michael Feuer may refer to:

- Mike Feuer (born 1958), American politician and lawyer
- Michael J. Feuer, American educator, professor and writer
