= Penelope Peterson =

American psychologist and academic administrator

Penelope L. Peterson
- Occupation: Dean of Northwestern University School of Education and Social Policy (SESP)

Penelope L. Peterson is an American educational psychologist and academic administrator. Peterson was named Dean of Northwestern University School of Education and Social Policy in September 1997 and previously served as University Distinguished Professor of Education at Michigan State University and Sears-Bascom Professor of Education at University of Wisconsin–Madison. She also served as president of the American Education Research Association (1996–1997).

Peterson was one of the first females to receive her bachelor's degree in psychology and philosophy from Iowa State University in 1971, and she received a Ph.D. in psychological studies in education from the Stanford Graduate School of Education in 1976. She remains Eleanor R. Baldwin Professor of Education. Peterson's books include Restructuring in the Classroom: Teaching, Learning, and School Organization (with Richard Elmore and Sarah McCarthey) and Learning from Our Lives: Women, Research, and Autobiography in Education (with Anna Neumann).

Peterson's areas of expertise include (1) learning and teaching in schools and classrooms, particularly in literacy and mathematics; (2) student and teacher learning in reform contexts; and (3) relations among educational research, policy and practice.

== Academic awards and positions ==
In 1986, the American Educational Research Association (AERA) gave Peterson its Raymond B. Cattell Early Award, citing her research into effective teaching and learning. From 1996 to 1997, Peterson served as AERA President. As president, she led an effort to make educational research more accessible to teachers, administrators, and policy makers. In [years needed], Peterson participated in the United States National Academy of Sciences Study Panel on the "Science of Learning." The panel's work culminated in production of "How People Learn," a monograph that integrated research on cognition, cognitive neuroscience, learning, and the design of effective educational environments. In addition, Peterson is a fellow of the American Psychological Association and the American Psychological Society.

== International initiatives ==
From May 13 to 16, 2009, Peterson traveled to Beijing, China with Chicago Mayor Richard M. Daley, as part of a cultural and business exchange between the Chinese capital and the Second City. The trip included a meeting with China's Minister of Education and visits to a technical junior high school and high school. According to Peterson, the trip led her to consider expanding SESP's international initiatives because of the importance for Northwestern students of connecting with their counterparts abroad, in particular with China.

In February 2009, Peterson presented research at “The Internationalization of Education Research: How Will It Affect Teacher Education Programs?”, an AERA-sponsored forum. Her participation in the forum reflects the trend toward international studies of teacher preparation and student learning. In particular, the forum will focus on developing a new research organization with an international bent: the World Education Research Association (WERA). The WERA would help globalize education research into important aspects of learning and teaching, including assessment, accountability, studies of memory, and professional development.

== Works ==
=== Articles ===
- Peterson, P. (1998, April 1). Why Do Educational Research? Rethinking Our Roles and Identities, Our Texts and Contexts. Educational Researcher, 27(3), 4–10.
- Peterson, P. (1993, September 1). Toward an Understanding of What We Know about School Learning. Review of Educational Research, 63(3), 319–26.
- Peterson, P., & Center for the Learning and Teaching of Elementary Subjects, E. (1991, August 1). Revising Their Thinking: Keisha Coleman and Her Third-Grade Mathematics Class. Elementary Subjects Center Series, No. 49.
- Peterson, P. (1990, September 1). Doing More in the Same Amount of Time: Cathy Swift. Educational Evaluation and Policy Analysis, 12(3), 277–96.
- Peterson, P. (1990, September 1). The California Study of Elementary Mathematics. Educational Evaluation and Policy Analysis, 12(3), 257–61.

=== Articles: co-authored ===
- Neumann, A., Pallas, A., & Peterson, P. (2008, January 1). Exploring the Investment: Four Universities' Experiences with the Spencer Foundation's Research Training Grant Program—A Retrospective. Teachers College Record, 110(7), 1477–1503.
- Wilson, S., Peterson, P., & National Education Association, W. (2006, July 1). Theories of Learning and Teaching: What Do They Mean for Educators? Working Paper. National Education Association Research Department.
- Grant, S., Peterson, P., & Shojgreen-Downer, A. (1996, June 1). Learning To Teach Mathematics in the Context of Systemic Reform. American Educational Research Journal, 33(2), 509–41.
- Peterson, P., & Others, A. (1996, March 1). Learning from School Restructuring. American Educational Research Journal, 33(1), 119–53.
- Peterson, P., & Barnes, C. (1996, March 1). Learning Together: The Challenge of Mathematics, Equity, and Leadership. Phi Delta Kappan, 77(7), 485–91.
- Knapp, N., & Peterson, P. (1995, January 1). Teachers' Interpretations of CGI after Four Years: Meanings and Practices. Journal for Research in Mathematics Education, 26(1), 40–65.
- Peterson, P., Center for the Learning and Teaching of Elementary Subjects, E., & Others, A. (1993, March 1). Elementary Teachers' Reports of Their Goals and Instructional Practices in Six School Subjects. Elementary Subjects Center Series No. 103.
- Knapp, N., Peterson, P., & Michigan State Univ., E. (1993, March 1). Understanding Learners' Understandings. Elementary Subjects Center Series No. 97.
- Knapp, N., Peterson, P., & Center for the Learning and Teaching of Elementary Subjects, E. (1991, August 1). What Does CGI Mean to You? Teachers' Ideas of a Research-Based Intervention Four Years Later. Elementary Subjects Center Series, No. 48.
- Peterson, P., Fennema, E., & Center for the Learning and Teaching of Elementary Subjects, E. (1991, July 1). Mathematics Teaching and Learning: Researching in Well-Defined Mathematical Domains. Proceedings from Michigan State University Conference (East Lansing, Michigan, October 4–8, 1989). Elementary Subjects Center Series, No. 40.
- Peterson, P., Center for the Learning and Teaching of Elementary Subjects, E., & Others, A. (1991, June 1). Profiles of Practice: Elementary School Teachers' Views of Their Mathematics Teaching. Elementary Subjects Center Series, No. 39.
- Peterson, P., & Others, A. (1991, March 1). Using Children's Mathematical Knowledge.
- Peterson, P., & Comeaux, M. (1990, March 1). Evaluating the Systems: Teachers' Perspectives on Teacher Evaluation. Educational Evaluation and Policy Analysis, 12(1), 3-24.

=== Books ===
- Peterson, P. (1983, November). Social Context of Instruction: Group Organization and Group Processes.
- Peterson, P. ed. Review of Educational Research (Volume 55. Number 4. Winter 1985).

=== Books: co-authored ===
- Neumann, A., & Peterson, P. (1997, January 1). Learning from Our Lives: Women, Research, and Autobiography in Education.
- Elmore, R., Peterson, P., & McCarthey, S. (1996, January 1). Restructuring in the Classroom: Teaching, Learning, and School Organization.
