= Randy Elliot Bennett =

American educational researcher

- Born: Brooklyn, New York
- Occupation: Educational Researcher
- Writing career
- Notable awards: AERA E.F. Lindquist Award; AERA Cognition and Assessment SIG Outstanding Contribution to Research in Cognition and Assessment Award; NCME Bradley Hanson Award; Teachers College, Columbia University Distinguished Alumni Award

Randy Elliot Bennett is an educational researcher whose work has focused on educational assessment and on the use of cognitive science, technology, and measurement in assessment design. He is Principal of Assessment Innovation Matters. He began work at Educational Testing Service (ETS) in 1979 and was the Norman O. Frederiksen Chair in Assessment Innovation in the ETS Research division from 2010 to 2025.

From 1999 to 2005, Bennett directed the National Assessment of Educational Progress (NAEP) Technology-Based Assessment project, and from 2007 to 2016 he directed the Cognitively Based Assessment of, for, and as Learning (CBAL) research initiative. He served as president of the National Council on Measurement in Education (NCME) in 2017–18, was elected a Fellow of the American Educational Research Association (AERA) in 2017, and was elected to membership in the National Academy of Education in 2022.

== Career and research ==
The NAEP Technology-Based Assessment project examined the use of computers in NAEP. Its Math Online and Writing Online studies compared computer-delivered and paper-based assessments; a later study examined problem solving in technology-rich environments. The latter study used two computer-based scenarios with more than 2,000 eighth-grade students in a nationally representative sample. Education Week identified Bennett as the study's primary author and reported that the tasks combined open-ended responses with cognitive and computer skills.

From 2007 to 2016, Bennett directed CBAL, a research initiative intended to create theory-based summative and formative assessment. In a 2010 article, he described a CBAL theory of action intended to document what students had learned, help plan instruction, and make assessment part of learning. His 2011 review of formative assessment examined its definition, claims about effectiveness, domain considerations, measurement principles, teacher support, and the wider educational system. Education Week reported Bennett's view that the research on formative assessment was not as uniformly supportive as it was sometimes presented. A contemporaneous Edutopia report described CBAL as an ETS project that combined accountability testing with complex tasks and information intended to support instruction.

Bennett's publications also address technology and data in assessment. An early article with Isaac Bejar examined validity in automated scoring, and a later chapter with Mo Zhang treated automated scoring as a validity problem involving more than agreement with human scores. A coauthored 2018 study modeled pauses in writing keystroke logs as a way of characterizing processes in essay composition. His 2015 review examined the changing nature of educational assessment as testing moved from paper to electronic formats.

Since 2023, Bennett has published on socioculturally responsive, personalized, and equitable assessment. In a 2023 paper, he proposed a working definition, provisional design principles, and the beginnings of a theory for socioculturally responsive assessment. A 2024 article discussed the case for personalized assessment and its measurement issues. In a 2025 narrative review, he examined structural inequity and its implications for educational assessment through the concept of opportunity to learn.

== Professional service and recognition ==
Bennett served as president of NCME in 2017–18 and has also served as president of the International Association for Educational Assessment. AERA named him a Fellow in 2017, and the National Academy of Education elected him a member in 2022. He received the Teachers College Distinguished Alumni Award in 2016, the NCME Bradley Hanson Award for Contributions to Educational Measurement in 2019 with Hongwen Guo, Mo Zhang, and Paul Deane, the AERA E. F. Lindquist Award in 2020, and the AERA Outstanding Contribution to Research in Cognition and Assessment award in 2024.

== Selected publications ==
- Bennett, Randy Elliot (1998). Reinventing Assessment: Speculations on the Future of Large-Scale Educational Testing (Report). Educational Testing Service, Policy Information Center.
- Bennett, Randy Elliot (2010). "Cognitively Based Assessment of, for, and as Learning: A Preliminary Theory of Action for Summative and Formative Assessment". Measurement: Interdisciplinary Research and Perspectives. 8 (2–3): 70–91. doi:10.1080/15366367.2010.508686.
- Bennett, Randy Elliot (2011). "Formative assessment: A critical review". Assessment in Education: Principles, Policy & Practice. 18 (1): 5–25. doi:10.1080/0969594X.2010.513678.
- Bennett, Randy Elliot (2015). "The Changing Nature of Educational Assessment". Review of Research in Education. 39 (1): 370–407. doi:10.3102/0091732X14554179.
- Bennett, Randy Elliot (2023). "Toward a Theory of Socioculturally Responsive Assessment". Educational Assessment. 28 (2): 83–104. doi:10.1080/10627197.2023.2202312.
- Bennett, Randy Elliot (2024). "Personalizing Assessment: Dream or Nightmare?". Educational Measurement: Issues and Practice. 43 (4): 119–125. doi:10.1111/emip.12652.
- Bennett, Randy Elliot (2025). "Rethinking Equity and Assessment through Opportunity to Learn". Assessment in Education: Principles, Policy & Practice. 32 (1): 5–32. doi:10.1080/0969594X.2025.2462549.
