= David Gillborn =

British educational researcher (born 1962)

- Born: 11 April 1962 (age 64)
- Education: University of Nottingham (B.A., 1983; Ph.D., 1987)
- Known for: Work on critical race theory in education
- Awards: Laureate of Kappa Delta Pi since 2015
- Scientific career
- Fields: Sociology
- Workplaces: University of Birmingham
- Thesis: The negotiation of educational opportunity: the final years of compulsory schooling in a multi-ethnic inner-city comprehensive (1987)
- Doctoral advisors: Julia Evetts, Danny Lawrence

David Gillborn (born 11 April 1962) is a British educational researcher known for his work in critical race theory as it relates to education. He is Professor of Critical Race Studies at the University of Birmingham, where he is also director of research in the School of Education and the director of the Centre for Research in Race and Education. He serves as the editor-in-chief of Race Ethnicity and Education.

== Education ==
Gillborn received his B.A. with honors in sociology of education from the University of Nottingham in 1983, and subsequently received his Ph.D. in sociology of education from there in 1987.

== Awards and honors ==
Gillborn received the Derrick Bell Legacy Award from the Critical Race Studies in Education Association in 2012. In 2015, he was named a laureate of Kappa Delta Pi.
