= Henry Levin =

Henry Levin may refer to:

- Henry Levin (director) (1909–1980), American stage actor and director
- Henry Levin (economist), professor of economics and education at Columbia University
