= Lee Ann Jung =

American educator and author

Lee Ann Jung is an American author, professor, and educational consultant whose work focuses on inclusive education, grading reform, and classroom-based support for neurodivergent learners. She is the founder of Lead Inclusion and a clinical professor at San Diego State University. Jung has published widely on Universal Design for Learning (UDL), Multi-Tiered Systems of Support (MTSS), classroom assessment, and individualized intervention planning.

== Career ==
Jung began her career as a special education teacher. She has held faculty positions at Samford University and, from 2002 to 2016, at University of Kentucky, where she was a professor and the director of international school partnerships. Since 2017, she has been a clinical professor in Educational Leadership at San Diego State University.

In 2018, she founded Lead Inclusion, an international consulting organization that supports independent and public schools in building inclusive and research-informed instructional and assessment systems.

== Publications ==
Jung is the author or co-author of the following books:

- Every Child Deserves a Special Education: Five Mindframes That Ensure All Students Learn (with John Hattie, Douglas Fisher, Nancy Frey, and Lorraine Graham, Corwin Press, 2025)
- Assessment of Young Children (with Gayle Mindes, 6th ed., Brookes Publishing, 2026)
- Your Students, My Students, Our Students: Rethinking Equitable and Inclusive Classrooms (with Douglas Fisher, Nancy Frey, and Julie Kroener, ASCD, 2019)
- Grading Exceptional and Struggling Learners (with Thomas Guskey, Corwin Press, 2012)
- Answers to Essential Questions About Standards, Assessments, Grading, and Reporting (with Thomas Guskey, Corwin Press, 2013)
- Assessing Students, Not Standards: Begin With What Matters Most (Corwin Press, 2024)
- Seen, Heard, and Valued: Universal Design for Learning and Beyond (Corwin Press, 2023)
- From Goals to Growth: Intervention and Support in Every Classroom (ASCD, 2018)
- A Practical Guide to Planning Interventions and Monitoring Progress (Solution Tree, 2015)

== Research and Grants ==
Jung's research has focused on inclusive grading, progress monitoring, and intervention design. Her article Grading Exceptional Learners is widely cited in work on equitable grading and standards-based assessment.

She served as co-principal investigator on a National Institutes of Health-funded randomized controlled trial examining teacher coaching for students with autism.

== Professional Service ==
Jung served as Chair of the Classroom Assessment Special Interest Group (SIG) of the American Educational Research Association (AERA) from 2017 to 2018. She is section editor for the Routledge Encyclopedia of Education and has served on the editorial board of the Journal of Early Intervention.

She also served on the Higher Education Advisory Board for the Mastery Transcript Consortium (MTC), which led the field in envisioning an innovative alternative to traditional high school transcripts.
