= Lorrie Shepard =

Lorrie A. Shepard
- Education: Pomona College (B.A., 1968); University of Colorado Boulder (M.A., 1970; Ph.D., 1972)
- Known for: Research on psychometrics and testing in school settings
- Awards: Distinguished Career Award from the National Council on Measurement in Education; David G. Imig Award for Distinguished Achievements in Teacher Education from the American Association of Colleges for Teacher Education
- Scientific career
- Fields: Educational psychology
- Workplaces: University of Colorado Boulder
- Thesis: A multitrait-multimethod approach to the construct validity of self-acceptance (1972)

Lorrie A. Shepard is a University Distinguished Professor of research and evaluation methodology and former Dean of the School of Education at the University of Colorado Boulder. She joined the faculty of CU Boulder in 1974, and was named the dean of the School of Education there in 2001. She retired from her position as School of Education Dean in 2016, but remains a distinguished professor there. She has been the president of the National Academy of Education, the American Educational Research Association, and the National Council on Measurement in Education. She has also been editor-in-chief of the Journal of Educational Measurement and the American Educational Research Journal. She is known for her work on psychometrics and the use of testing in the educational system. She has also researched the effects of grade retention in schools, and has argued that it is ineffective at improving student performance.
