= Deborah Vandell =

Developmental psychologist

- Occupation: Professor of Education
- Awards: National AfterSchool Association: 25 Most Influential People in Afterschool (2014); Society for Research in Child Development: Distinguished Contributions to Public Policy and Practice in Child Development (2019)

Academic background
- Education: Rice University Harvard University Boston University

Deborah Lowe Vandell is a developmental psychologist and an expert on the impact of early child care on children's developmental trajectories and the benefits of children's participation in afterschool programs and other organized activities. She is the Founding Dean of the University of California, Irvine School of Education and Chancellor Professor of Education and Psychology.

Vandell is a Member of the National Academy of Education and a Fellow of the American Psychological Association (APA), the Association of Psychological Science, and the American Educational Research Association. In 2020 Vandell served as President of the APA, Division 7 (Developmental Psychology).

== Awards ==
Vandell has received a number of prestigious honors over her career. In 2014, she was named one of the 25 Most Influential People in Afterschool by the National AfterSchool Association. That year she also received the National "Afterschool for All" Champion Award from Afterschool Alliance and a Woman to Watch Award from the Orange County Register. In 2019 she received the Society for Research in Child Development Award for Distinguished Contributions to Public Policy and Practice in Child Development, citing her work "helping policy makers and program developers make evidence-based decisions about how early caregiving, in particular non-parents, affect child development."

== Biography ==
Vandell received her B.A. in psychology in 1971 from Rice University and an Ed.M. in Human Development at Harvard University in 1972. She gained teaching experience from 1972-1973 working as a Kindergarten and second grade teacher. Vandell continued her education at Boston University, obtaining a Ph.D. in Psychology in 1977. Her dissertation titled "Boy toddlers' social interaction with mothers, fathers, and peers" was conducted under the supervision of Edward C Mueller.

Vandell held faculty positions at the University of Texas at Dallas (1976-1989) and at the University of Wisconsin–Madison (1989-2005) before moving to the University of California, Irvine in 2006.

Vandell created the Afterschool Outcomes Online Toolbox, used by the state of California to determine the quality of afterschool programs and their impact on children's skills development, including science, technology, engineering, and mathematics (STEM) learning outcomes. She has provided testimony before the U.S. Congress and other governing to inform decisions on early childhood and afterschool programming policies and was an invited participant in the White House Conference on Child Care and the White House Conference on Early Brain Development (both held in 1997).

Vandell served a lead scientist in the National Institute of Child Health and Human Development (NICHD) Early Child Care Research Network and the NICHD Study of Early Child Care and Youth Development.

Vandell is co-author of the textbook Life-Span Development: Infancy Through Adulthood (with Laurence Steinberg, Marc H. Bornstein, and Karen S. Rook).

== Research ==
Vandell had contributed to large-scale, longitudinal studies exploring how the quality of a child's care impacts their academic and social development from early childhood up to adolescence. The findings indicate that children who have access to full-time experienced caregivers have better social, cognitive, behavioral, and academic outcomes than children attended to by part-time caregivers. Children who do not have access to a good quality of care, whether it be from home or school programs, are more impulsive, risk-taking, and are less likely to respond well in social situations. Vandell's research on the impact of afterschool programs on children's academic and behavioral development indicates benefits of enrollment in afterschool programs in elementary school, including increased school attendance and academic skills and lower incidence of behavioral problems such as aggression.

== Representative work ==
- Vandell, D. L. (1996). Characteristics of infant child care: Factors contributing to positive caregiving. Early Childhood Research Quarterly, 11(3), 269-306.
- Vandell, D. L. (2004). Early child care: The known and the unknown. Merrill-Palmer Quarterly, 50(3), 387-414.
- Vandell, D.L., Belsky, J., Burchinal, M., Steinberg, L., Vandergrift, N. and (2010), Do effects of early child care extend to age 15 years? Results From the NICHD Study of Early Child Care and Youth Development. Child Development, 81, 737-756.
- Vandell, D. L., & Hembree, S. E. (1994). Peer social status and friendship: Independent contributors to children's social and academic adjustment. Merrill-Palmer Quarterly 40(4), 461-477.
- Vandell, D. L., & Ramanan, J. (1992). Effects of early and recent maternal employment on children from low‐income families. Child Development, 63(4), 938-949.
- Vandell, D. L., & Shumow, L. (1999). After-school child care programs. The Future of Children, 9(2), 64-80.
