= Carla Pugh =

American surgeon

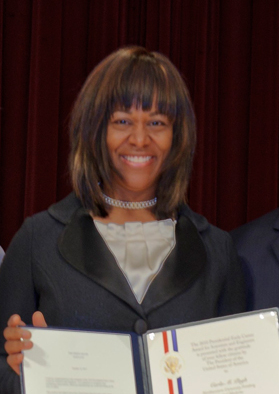
- Pugh in 2011
- Born: Berkeley, California, USA
- Spouse: Joseph Towles (m. 2003)
- Awards: Presidential Early Career Award for Scientists and Engineers

Academic background
- Education: BSc, neurobiology, University of California, Berkeley; MD, 1992, Howard University College of Medicine; PhD, 2001, Stanford Graduate School of Education
- Thesis: Evaluating simulators for medical training: the case of the pelvic exam model (2001)

Carla Marie Pugh is an American surgeon. She was elected a member of the National Academy of Medicine in 2021 for "pioneering sensor technology research that helped to define, characterize and inspire new and innovative performance metrics and data analysis strategies for the emerging field of digital health care."

== Early life and education ==
Pugh was born and raised in Berkeley, California. She completed her Pre-medical degree at her hometown University of California, Berkeley before entering Howard University College of Medicine. Upon earning her medical degree, she completed her residency in general surgery at Howard University in 1997. Following this, Pugh wished to "learn about learning — about curriculum, about assessment — in a structured way" and subsequently enrolled at the Stanford Graduate School of Education for her PhD in Curriculum Studies and Teacher Education.

While conducting her PhD, Pugh built fake breasts in her laboratory from everyday off-the-shelf items to teach students how to properly conduct breast exams. She attached sensors to the models so teachers could know whether the students were using appropriate pressure or touching the correct areas. She also developed the E-Pelvis, an electronic pelvic mannequin attached to a computer monitor, to improve medical students' skills. In 2003, the E-Pelvis gained a licensing agreement for wide-scale manufacturing.

== Career ==
=== Northwestern University ===
Following her PhD, Pugh joined the faculty at the Northwestern University Feinberg School of Medicine. As an associate professor, Pugh continued her efforts in improving medical students' skills when conducting breast and pelvic exams. Her research team began building a set of 100 sensor-enabled breast examination simulators with simulated abnormalities and also analyzed which palpation techniques were most effective for diagnosing cancer. As a result of her research, Pugh was recognized for her accomplishments in an exhibit titled "New Frontiers In Academic Surgery" at the United States National Library of Medicine in 2007. A few years later, Pugh received the Presidential Early Career Award for Scientists and Engineers from President Barack Obama "for her novel research to develop the first physical test that measures medical students’ and physicians’ ability to perform a clinical exam of breasts and diagnose cancer."

In 2013, Pugh was elected to the American Surgical Association and was also named to the editorial board of the American Educational Research Journal.

=== University of Wisconsin–Madison ===
Pugh eventually left Northwestern to join the faculty at the University of Wisconsin–Madison as an associate professor in the Department of Surgery at their University of Wisconsin School of Medicine and Public Health. During her tenure at the institution, she was also named faculty leader for the Department of Surgery’s Simulation & Engineering for Surgical Education. As a result, she received the 2017 Vilas Faculty Mid-Career Investigator Award.

=== Stanford ===
Pugh returned to her alma mater, Stanford, in December 2017 to take a dual role as a professor of general surgery and director of the Technology Enabled Clinical Improvement Center. While serving in these roles, she was elected a Fellow of the American Institute for Medical and Biological Engineering and was selected as one of the 2019 Olga Jonasson Distinguished Member Award recipients. Later that year, Pugh joined a multi-institutional collaboration called the Surgical Metrics Project to harvest data from audio and video recordings of surgeons and wearable sensors that measure motion, brain waves and tactile pressure.

In 2020, Pugh was elected president of the Society of Black Academic Surgeons for the 2021–2022 term. She was also named to the American Board of Surgery Council for six years. In 2021, she was elected a member of the National Academy of Medicine for "pioneering sensor technology research that helped to define, characterize and inspire new and innovative performance metrics and data analysis strategies for the emerging field of digital health care."

== Personal life ==
Pugh married her husband Joseph Towles in 2003.
