= Catherine E. Snow =

American psychologist

Catherine Elizabeth Snow
- Born: December 14, 1945 (age 80)
- Occupations: Educational psychologist, applied linguist
- Spouse: Michael Baum

Catherine Elizabeth Snow (born December 14, 1945) is an educational psychologist and applied linguist. In 2009 Snow was appointed to the Patricia Albjerg Graham Professorship in the Harvard Graduate School of Education, having previously held the Henry Lee Shattuck Professorship also in the Harvard Graduate School of Education. Snow is past president of the American Educational Research Association (2000–2001).

Snow has contributed to theories of bilingualism and language acquisition through parent–child interaction.

== Education ==
Snow was born on December 14, 1945 in Toledo, Ohio. She received her Bachelor of Arts in Education from Oberlin College in 1966, one year later, she earned the Masters of Arts in the same topic from McGill University. She finished her education at McGill University, graduating with a PhD in Education in 1971.

== Bilingualism research ==
=== Home factors ===
Snow was interested in the relationship of individual home conditions and the ability to become proficient in two languages. In order to determine the role of vocabulary in the bilingual population, a series of experiments were conducted analyzing the consequences of the socioeconomic status (SES) of individuals as well as language predictors in both of the languages in question—Spanish and English. considered to explain parental preference explained only 13% of variability of literacy among individuals with an internal reliability of .85. Children in homes that used mainly English tended to have a higher proficiency in English, and predominantly Spanish speakers tended to have a higher proficiency in Spanish. For parental preference when Spanish was the first language, it was found that the father's language preference was more predictive of the child's proficiency in that particular language. For preference in the English language, both maternal and paternal preference were significant factors in predicting the proficiency of a particular language. Even if Spanish was preferred in an initially English-speaking home, the child had a higher proficiency in the Spanish language.

Snow took part in research where the focus was to see if household factors such as family characteristics and home language use had an influence on a child's English and Spanish vocabulary. The study found that family income did not have an impact on the child's vocabulary and that children in low-income households were more expressive during book-sharing activities having a positive impact on the child's vocabulary. The study also noted how the more exposure a child had to either a parent, relative or sibling read to them the better it impacted the child's vocabulary. In the home, the more exposure a child has to language, the richer their vocabulary.

=== Maternal factors ===
Snow's research studied if the mother's interaction had an impact on the child's vocabulary in both English and Spanish. The study found that when mother's used labeling questions during book sharing time, it had a positive impact on the child's vocabulary. When the mother used labeling questions it also had a strong a positive connection with Spanish vocabulary while it also had a weaker and positive connection with English vocabulary. The study also found how Spanish culture may have an effect in having their children have open ended responses with their mothers. The more the mother spoke in English the negative result it had in the child's Spanish vocabulary but positively impacted the child's English vocabulary.

=== Perspectives ===
Snow participated in a guide in 1992 called Educational Researcher, published by American Educational Research Association to answer some questions and explain the research behind second language development. Snow argues that young learners such as children will learn a second language better in a social environment of that foreign language. For older learners, being taught by a tutor who is proficient in that foreign language will allow older learners to learn and develop their second language better. As a result of this, the Foreign Based approach was later challenged by a L1 Based Approach. Snow states that this approach researches and supports what the Foreign-based model didn't.

=== Literacy development in elementary school second-language learners ===
Snow was a part of a series of studies that collected data on the language development of bilingual students. Researchers controlled a variation in teaching methods by studying children only in schools that employed Success for All. The research concluded that being orally proficient in a first-language will not be enough to develop second-language skills. The work suggested that children need to be literate in their first language to build second-language skills and having instructions in their first language will only be beneficial to their success.

Educational offices
Preceded by Lorrie A. Shepard	President of the American Educational Research Association; 2000–2001	Succeeded by Andrew C. Porter
