= Robert L. Linn =

American psychologist (1938–2015)

- Born: June 29, 1938
- Died: December 8, 2015 (aged 77); La Grange Park, Illinois
- Education: University of Illinois Urbana-Champaign
- Known for: Tucker–Koopman–Linn model
- Awards: E. L. Thorndike Award (1992)
- Scientific career
- Fields: Educational psychology
- Workplaces: University of Illinois Urbana-Champaign; University of Colorado Boulder
- Doctoral advisors: Ledyard Tucker; Lloyd Humphreys

Robert Lee Linn (June 29, 1938 – December 8, 2015) was an American educational psychologist who has made notable contributions to the understanding of educational assessments. He studied technical and policy issues relating to the application of test data, and the effects of high-stakes testing on teaching and learning. He was a professor emeritus at the University of Colorado Boulder, past president of the American Educational Research Association and the National Council on Measurement in Education (NCME), and former editor of the Journal of Educational Measurement. He completed his MA and PhD in educational psychology at the University of Illinois Urbana-Champaign. From 1965 until 1973, he held positions as a research scientist and later research division director at Educational Testing Service in Princeton, New Jersey. In 1973, he joined the faculty at the University of Illinois Urbana-Champaign and in 1987 became a professor at the University of Colorado Boulder. Linn died in La Grange Park, Illinois, in December 2015 at the age of 77.

Educational offices
Preceded by Andrew C. Porter	President of the American Educational Research Association; 2002–2003	Succeeded by Hilda Borko
