= Thomas A. Romberg =

Thomas Albert Romberg (December 22, 1932 – September 3, 2023) was an American educator in mathematics who was Professor Emeritus of Curriculum and Instruction (mathematics education) at the School of Education, University of Wisconsin–Madison, and former director of the National Center for Improving Student Learning and Achievement in Mathematics and Science, Wisconsin Center for Education Research.

Romberg had a long history of leadership in mathematics curriculum reform. He received his B.S. in mathematics and M.S. in secondary education from the University of Nebraska Omaha. In 1968, he received his Ph.D. in mathematics education from Stanford University.

Romberg joined the faculty at the University of Wisconsin–Madison in 1966. Over the next forty years he became an internationally recognized leader of mathematics education in the U.S. As a researcher, he published 30 books and over 300 research papers. As a professional leader in mathematics education he is best known for two major accomplishments. He was the chair of the "Commission on Standards for School Mathematics" for the National Council of Teachers of Mathematics NCTM that led to the now flourishing standards-based movement in education. Second, from 1987 to 2002, he was Director of the National Center for Research in Mathematical Sciences Education for the U.S. Department of Education. This was the first such national research center devoted to the teaching and learning of mathematics, and became a widely respected research facility. In this role Tom served as an advisor to three U.S. Presidents and their Secretaries of Education and represented the U.S. on several international commissions.

In the 1980s, Romberg was chair of the National Council of Teachers of Mathematics (NCTM) commissions that produced Curriculum and Evaluation Standards NCTM standards for School Mathematics, and the Assessment Standards for School Mathematics. Romberg chaired NCTM's Research Advisory Committee that was responsible for starting the Journal for Research in Mathematics Education and the research pre-sessions at the NCTM's annual meetings.

He was a leader in developing the middle grades mathematics curriculum, Mathematics in Context.

Romberg's research focused on young children's learning of initial mathematical concepts, methods of evaluating students and programs, and integrating research on teaching, curriculum, and student thinking.

For his contributions at the University of Wisconsin–Madison he was awarded an endowed chair, and received a Faculty Distinguished Achievement Award. For his research he received the Review of Research award, the Interpretive Scholarship, and the Professional Service Awards from the American Educational Research Association; was named a Senior Research Fellowship by the Spencer Foundation; and was elected to membership in the National Academy of Education. For his contributions to mathematics education he was awarded the Lifetime Achievement Medal from the National Council of Teachers of Mathematics. He was named a distinguished alumnus of both the University of Nebraska Omaha and Stanford University. In 2002 he was an Invited Speaker at the ICM in Beijing.

He had an identical twin brother Theodore "Ted" Romberg (1932–2015), who was an ordained Methodist minister and professor of philosophy and education at Emerson College. Tom Romberg died on September 3, 2023, at the age of 90.
