= Michael J. Feuer =

American educator

Michael J. Feuer is an American educator, professor and writer, who was president of the National Academy of Education from 2013 to 2017.

== Early life and education ==
Feuer grew up in New York city, where after attending public schools, he studied at Queens College, City University of New York, receiving a Bachelor's degree with honours in English Literature and journalism. This was followed by a Master's degree in public management from the Wharton School, and the PhD in public policy analysis from the School of Public and Urban Policy, also at the University of Pennsylvania. Feuer also studied public administration at the Hebrew University of Jerusalem and political theory at the Sorbonne. He was a faculty member in the business school at Drexel University from 1981 to 1986, where he taught courses in science policy, public economics, and management science.

== Career ==
While studying at Queens, Feuer freelanced for The New York Times and also edited one of the college's student newspapers. As a PhD student at U. Penn he taught calculus for incoming economics students. On receiving his doctorate, he lectured on education and economics at the university and was appointed to the faculty of Drexel University.

Feuer held senior positions at the Congressional Office of Technology Assessment and the National Academy of Sciences. In 2010 he was appointed Dean of the graduate school of education and human development at the George Washington University, and Professor of education policy, where he has been responsible for programs covering a wide range of topics in education, measurement, psychological development, special education, counseling, and leadership. In 2014, President Barack Obama appointed Feuer to the National Board of Education Sciences.

== Positions held ==
- Dean of the Graduate School of Education and Human Development, George Washington University, 2010–present
- Professor of Education Policy, George Washington, 2010–present
- President of the National Academy of Education, 2013–17
- Member of the National Board of Education Sciences, 2014-2018
- Fellow of the American Association for the Advancement of Science
- Fellow of the American Educational Research Association
- Co-chair, Consortium for Applied Studies in Jewish Education

== Selected publications ==
- Can Schools Save Democracy? Civic Education and the Common Good (Baltimore, MD: Johns Hopkins University Press, 2023)
- The Rising Price of Objectivity: Philanthropy, Government, and the Future of Education Research (Cambridge, MA: Harvard Education Press, 2016)
- Moderating the Debate: Rationality and the Promise of American Education (Cambridge, MA: Harvard Education Press, 2006)
- Evaluation of Teacher Preparation Programs: Purposes, Methods, and Policy Options, Washington, DC: National Academy of Education, Fall 2013 (with R. Floden, N. Chudowsky, and J. Ahn)
- Uncommon Measures: Linkage and Equivalence of Educational Tests, Washington, DC: National Academy Press, 1999 (with P. Holland)
- Transitions in Work and Learning: Implications for Assessment, Washington, DC: National Academy Press, 1998 (with A. Lesgold)
- 'Pure and Applied Science and Pasteur’s Quadrant', in D. Philips, et al, Eds, Encyclopedia of Educational Theory, Sage, June 2014
- 'Validity of International Large-Scale Assessments: Truth and Consequences', in M. Chatterji, ed., Validity and Test Use: An International Dialogue on Educational Assessment, Accountability and Equity. London: Emerald, 2013
- 'No Country Left Behind: Notes on the Rhetoric of International Comparisons of Education', William H. Angoff Invited Lecture, Princeton: ETS, August 2012
- 'Commentary: Disciplined Education Policy Research', in Gary Sykes, Barbara Schneider, David N. Plank, eds, Handbook of Education Policy Research, American Education Research Association: Routledge, April 2009
- 'Future Directions for Educational Accountability: Notes for a Political Economy of Measurement', in L. Shepard and K. Ryan, Eds. The Future of Test-based Educational Accountability, New York: Routledge, 2008
- 'Linking Tests and Democratic Education', in C. Dwyer, ed., Measurement and Research in the Accountability Era, Mahwah, NJ: Lawrence Erlbaum, 2005
- 'The National Academies', in J. Guthrie et al., The Encyclopedia of Education, 2nd edition, New York: Macmillan, 2002 (with B. Alberts)
- 'Social Policy and Intelligence', in R. Sternberg, ed., Encyclopedia of Intelligence, Boston: Macmillan, 1994
- 'Firm-Financed Education and Specific Human Capital: A Test of the Insurance Hypothesis', in D. Stern and J. Ritzen, Eds: Market Failure in Training? New Economic Analysis and Evidence on Training of Employed Adults, New York: Springer-Verlag, 1992 (with H. Glick and A. Desai)
