= Angoff =

Angoff is a surname. Notable people with the surname include:

- Charles Angoff (1902–1979), American journalist
  - Charles Angoff Award
- William H. Angoff (1919–1993), American testing expert
