= William Tierney =

William Tierney may refer to:

- William L. Tierney (1876–1958), U.S. Representative from Connecticut
- William G. Tierney, American scholar of higher education
- Bill Tierney (William G. Tierney, born 1952), American lacrosse coach
- Bill Tierney (baseball) (William J. Tierney, 1858–1898), Major League Baseball player
