= Steven Davis (economist) =

American economist

Steven J. Davis
- Born: Steven Joseph Davis

Academic background
- Education: Portland State University; Brown University

Steven J. Davis, a renowned American economist, is the Thomas W. and Susan B. Ford Senior Fellow and the Director of Research at the Hoover Institution, and Senior Fellow at the Stanford Institute for Economic Policy Research (SIEPR). Before joining Hoover and Stanford, he was on the faculty at the University of Chicago Booth School of Business for more than 35 years. He is also a research associate of the National Bureau of Economic Research, visiting scholar at the Federal Reserve Bank of Atlanta, senior adviser to the Brookings Papers on Economic Activity, advisor to the Monetary Authority of Singapore, elected fellow of the Society of Labor Economists, IZA Research Fellow, and senior academic fellow of the Asian Bureau of Finance and Economic Research. Davis is a co-creator of the Economic Policy Uncertainty Index, the Survey of Business Uncertainty, the U.S. Survey of Working Arrangements and Attitudes, the Global Survey of Working Arrangements, and the Work-from-Home Map project. He co-founded and co-organizes the Asian Monetary Policy Forum, held annually in Singapore.

== Early life and education ==
Steven Davis graduated from Central Catholic High School in Portland Oregon. He received a Bachelor of Arts in economics from Portland State University in 1980. Davis completed his graduate work at Brown University earning an A.M. in 1981 and a Ph.D. in 1986. He joined the faculty at the University of Chicago Booth School of Business in 1985.

== Career ==
At the University of Chicago, Davis was involved in teaching and cutting-edge research in economics. From 2012 to 2015, he served as the Booth School's deputy dean of the faculty. In 2023, he moved to Stanford to become a Senior Fellow at the Hoover Institution. In 2024, he became the Director of Research at Hoover, reporting to Hoover Director Condoleezza Rice.

== Research Contributions ==
Davis has published widely in top academic journals and is particularly recognized for his work on labor markets and for measuring uncertainty and assessing its economic effects. His pioneering research on "Measuring Economic Policy Uncertainty" with Scott Baker and Nicholas Bloom develops many indicators of policy-related uncertainty and uses them to assess the effects of uncertainty on employment, investment, GDP, and the volatility of stock prices. This work is often cited by policymakers and economists alike for providing insights into how uncertainty affects decision-making by firms and affects economic performance.

=== Research on Remote Work ===
Davis and economists Jose Maria Barrero and Nicholas Bloom recognized early on that the shift to work from home would endure long after the COVID-19 pandemic ended. They created the Survey of Working Arrangements and Attitudes in May 2020 to understand this shift in how people work and live, and to explore the social and economic ramifications. They continue to design and oversee the survey, sampling about 8,000 working-age Americans each month. The survey data yield insights about working arrangements and labor markets for businesses, policy makers, and others. Since 2022, Davis has co-organized the Remote Work Conference, inviting researchers from around the world to Stanford to examine the latest research on the topic.

=== Public engagement ===
Apart from his academic contributions, Steven Davis has made significant efforts to communicate his research to broader audiences, contributing to discussions on the economic implications of public policy. He frequently writes and speaks about economic aspects of policy matters and other developments. Recent media engagements include:

“Slap-dash tariffs and uncertainty are taking time from business leaders, says Hoover’s Steven Davis,” The Exchange with Kelly Evans, CNBC, 5 March 2025.

“Why the Push to Get Bums on Seats in the Office?” This Working Life, ABC Radio News, 1 November 2024.

“Taking Stock: As Generations Collide, What Does the Future of Productivity Look Like?” Interview with Amanda Lang on BNN Bloomberg, 15 October 2024.

“Two Beers, a Pandemic, and a Workplace Revolution,” Krysten Crawford, Stanford Report, 2 October 2024. A profile of my research collaboration with Nick Bloom, focused on remote work and its implications.

“Working at Home Helped Whip Inflation,” Wall Street Journal, 20 June 2024.

=== Podcasts and Popular Media ===
Davis hosts Economics, Applied – a video podcast series sponsored by the Hoover Institution, featuring conversations with leaders and researchers about economic developments and their ramifications. The latest episodes include:

- “American Lives,” with Stelios Michalopoulos, 12 March 2025.
- “GenAI in the Workplace,” with David Deming, 26 February 2025.
- “Immigration and the Education of US-Born Children,” with David Figlio and Paola Sapienza, 29 January 2025.
- “The Chinese Exclusion Act and U.S. Economic Development,” with Nancy Qian, 15 January 2025.
- “New Insights on Remote Work” with Nick Bloom, 31 October 2024.

=== Notable Publications ===
Davis has written extensively on economic policy and labor economics. Some of his notable works include:

- "Job Creation and Destruction," with John Haltiwanger and Scott Schuh. Cambridge, Massachusetts: MIT Press, 1996.
- "Sectoral Job Creation and Destruction Responses to Oil Price Changes," with John Haltiwanger. Journal of Monetary Economics, December 2001.
- "Recessions and the Costs of Job Loss," with Till von Wachter. Brookings Papers on Economic Activity, April 2012.
- "Private Equity, Jobs, and Productivity" with John Haltiwanger, Ron Jarmin, Josh Lerner and Javier Miranda. American Economic Review, December 2014.
- "Measuring Economic Policy Uncertainty," with Scott R. Baker and Nicholas Bloom. Quarterly Journal of Economics, November 2016.
- “The Evolution of Work from Home” with Jose Maria Barrero and Nicholas Bloom. Journal of Economics Perspectives, Fall 2023.
- “Sticky Wages on the Layoff Margin,” with Pawel Krolikowski. American Economic Review, 114, no. 2 (February) 2025.

== Awards and honors ==
- Addington Prize in Measurement (2012)
- Society of Labor Economics, Elected Fellow (2015)
