= Hope Jensen Leichter =

American educationalist

Hope Jensen Leichter is an American educationalist. She serves as the Elbenwood Professor of Education at Teachers College, Columbia University.

She earned a bachelor's of arts degree from Oberlin College and completed her doctorate at Harvard University. Leichter has been a member of the National Academy of Education since 1979, and was awarded a Guggenheim Fellowship in 1981. She began her career working with the Russell Sage Foundation.

== Episodes ==
When Ruth Westheimer got accepted at Teachers College, Columbia University, she told Hope Leichter, her academic advisor, in the hallway of the college, "I do have to tell you something that you have to know. I just flunked an exam at the New School". And Hope Leichter famously said "So what?" Westheimer later got a doctorate degree under Hope Leichter and became Dr. Ruth.

== Notable Students ==
- Ruth Westheimer

== Related People ==
- Margaret Mead, research partner
- Jerome Bruner
- Lawrence Arthur Cremin

== Selected publications ==
- "Stories are Learning" (The Museum as a Place of Learning, Cornell University). Kinship and Casework: Family Networks and Social Intervention (Russell Sage Foundation).
- Families and Communities as Educators (Teachers College Press).
- "The school and parents" (The Teachers Handbook).
- "The concept of educative style" (Teachers College Record).
- "Family contexts of television" (Educational Communication and Technology).
- "Families and museum" (Marriage and Family Review).
