= Yossi Shavit =

Israeli sociologist

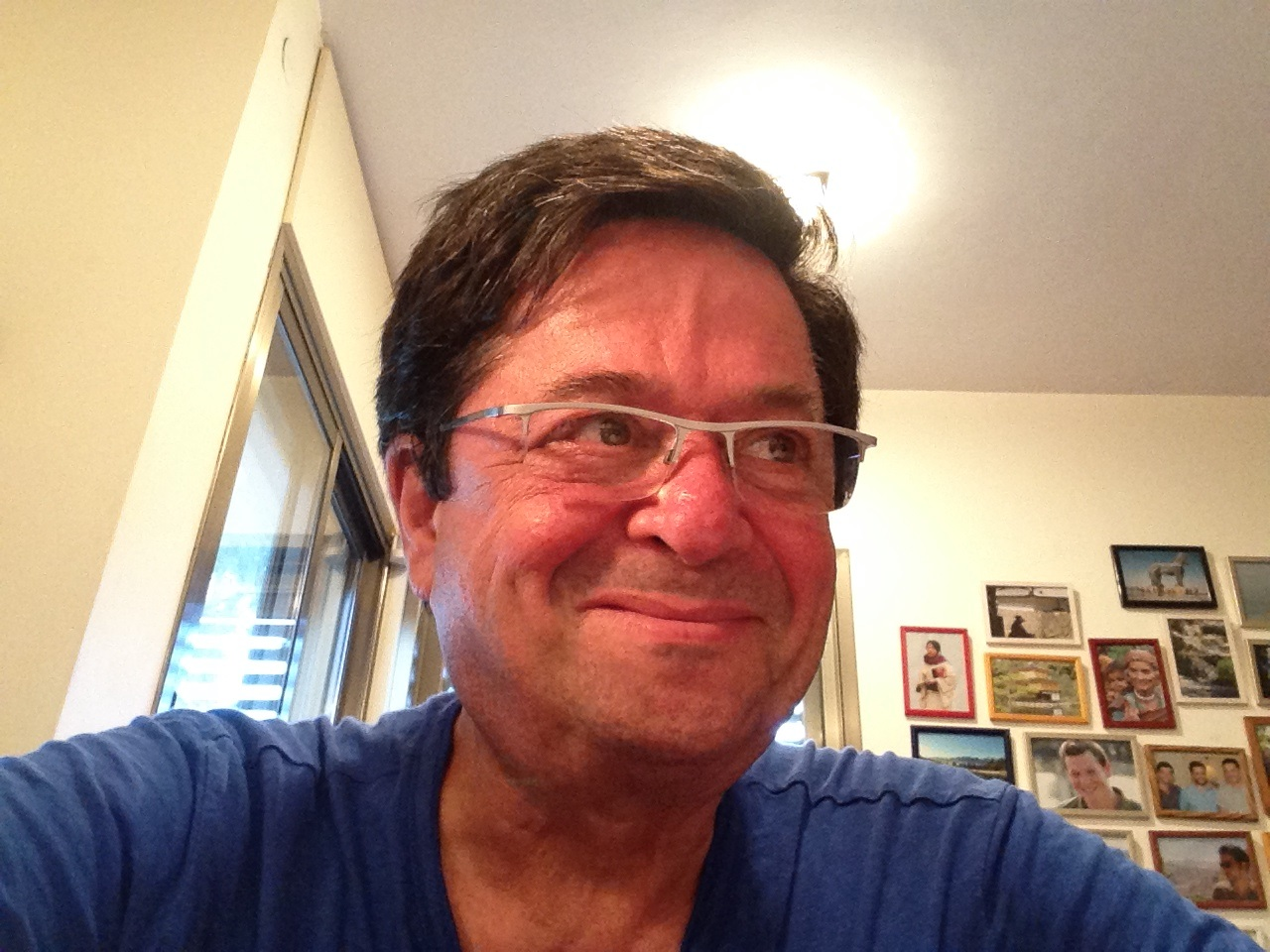
Yossi Shavit in 2014

Yossi Shavit (Hebrew: יוסי שביט) is an Israeli sociologist and professor emeritus at Tel Aviv University. He is recognized for his work in the fields of educational inequality, social stratification, mobility, and ethnic relations.

== Career ==
Shavit has served as President of the Israeli Sociological Society, and as President of Research Committee on Social Stratification and Mobility (RC28) of the International Sociological Association. He also held professorships at the Department of Political and Social Sciences at the European University Institute in Florence, and at the Department of Sociology at the University of Haifa. He is currently a member Emeritus of the National Academy of Education and a member of the Sociological Research Association.

Shavit engages in policy-related research. He is a Principal Researcher at the Taub Center for Social Policy Studies in Israel, where he directs the Initiative on Early Childhood Research, focusing on policies that influence early childhood development and their long-term educational effects.

== Books ==
- Educational Inequality in Israel: From Research to Policy. (2019) Taub Center for Social Policy Studies in Israel (in Hebrew).

=== Edited books ===
- Equality of Educational Opportunity: Developments in Theory and Research, Mofet (2017) (in Hebrew).
- The Challenges of Diaspora Migration: Perspectives on Israel and Germany. (2014) Ashgate Publishing.
- Stratification in Higher Education: A Comparative Study. (2007), Stanford University Press. A paperback edition was published in 2010.
- From School to Work: A Comparative Study of Educational Qualifications and Occupational Destinations. (1998) Oxford: Clarendon Press.
- Persistent Inequalities: a Comparative Study of Educational Attainment in Thirteen Countries. (1993) Westview Press.
