= Adam Gamoran =

American sociologist

Adam Gamoran (born 1957) is an American sociologist.

== Early life and education ==
He obtained his Ph.D. in Sociology of Education from the University of Chicago in 1984.

== Career ==
Until 2013, he had held the John D. MacArthur Chair in Sociology and Educational Policy Studies at the University of Wisconsin–Madison and chaired the Department of Sociology. He was also the director of the Wisconsin Center for Education Research. A particular focus of his research has been school structure, educational inequality, and school reform.

In 2013 he became the president of the William T. Grant Foundation, which funds social science research meant to improve the lives of young people.

He is a member of the National Academy of Education and the American Academy of Arts and Sciences. He served two terms on the National Board for Education Sciences, both times appointed by President Barack Obama.

== Selected bibliography ==
- Gamoran, A. (1987). The stratification of high school learning opportunities. Sociology of Education, 60, 135–155.
- Gamoran, A., and Mare, R. D. (1989). Secondary school tracking and educational inequality: Compensation, reinforcement, or neutrality? American Journal of Sociology, 94, 1146–1183.
- Gamoran, A. (1992). The variable effects of high school tracking. American Sociological Review, 57, 812–828.
- Gamoran, A., Nystrand, M., Berends, M., and Lepore, P. C. (1995). An organizational analysis of the effects of ability grouping. American Educational Research Journal, 32, 687–713.
- Gamoran, A., and Hannigan, E. (2000). Algebra for everyone? Benefits of college preparatory mathematics for students with diverse abilities in early secondary school. Educational Evaluation and Policy Analysis, 22, 241–254.
- Gamoran, A., Anderson, C. W., Quiroz, P. A., Secada, W. G., Williams, T., and Ashmann, S. (2003). Transforming teaching in math and science: How schools and districts can support change. New York: Teachers College Press.
- Shavit, Y., Arum, R. T., and Gamoran, A., with Menahem, G., Editors. (2007). Stratification in higher education: A comparative study. Stanford, CA: Stanford University Press.
- Gamoran, A., Editor. (2007). Standards-based reform and the poverty gap: Lessons for No Child Left Behind. Washington, DC:: Brookings Institution Press.
