= Wisconsin Center for Education Research =

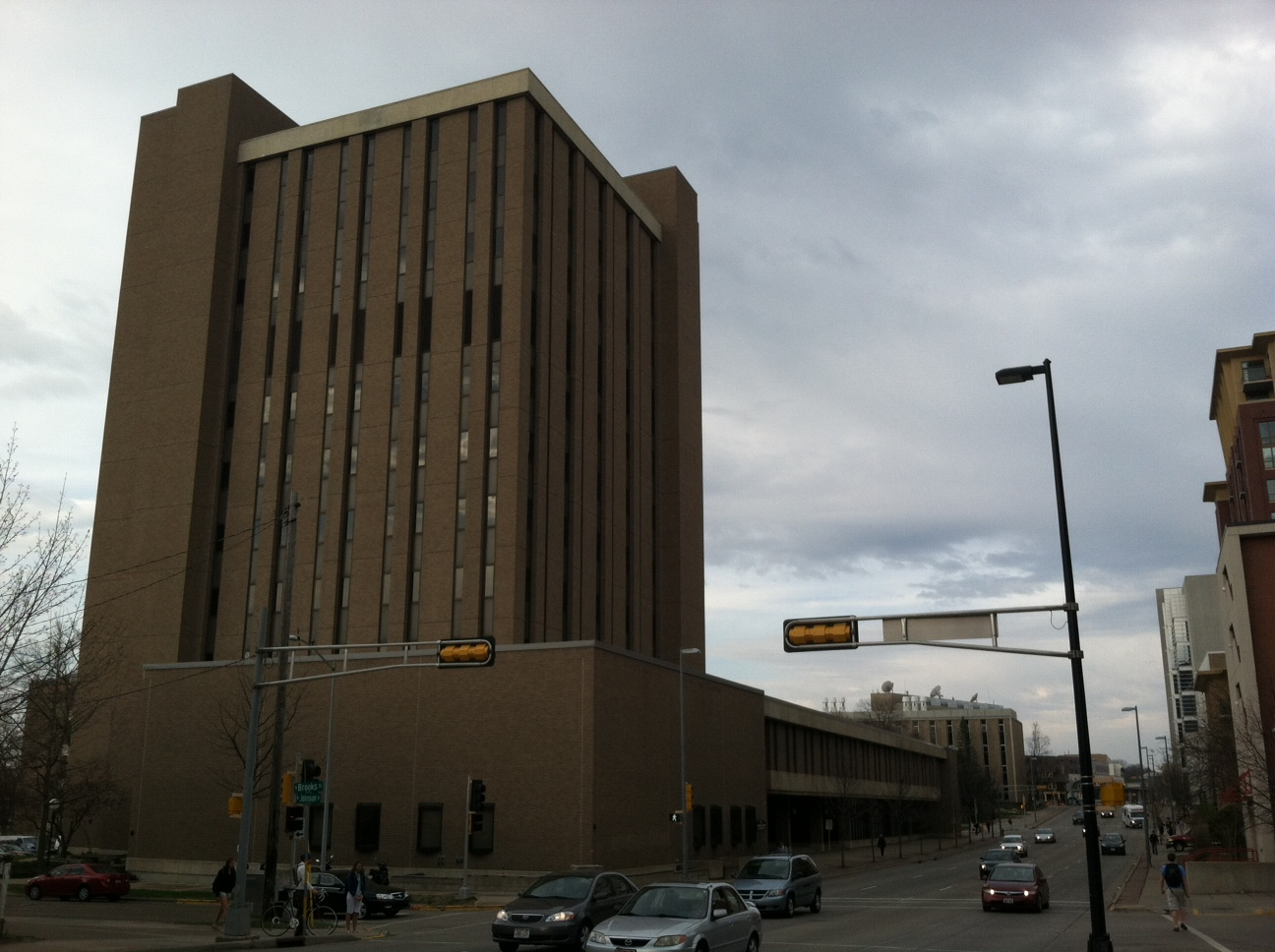
- Abbreviation: WCER
- Formation: 1964
- Location: Madison, Wisconsin
- Website: http://www.wcer.wisc.edu

Wisconsin Center for Education Research (WCER), located in Madison, Wisconsin, United States, is an education research center founded in 1964 as a branch of the School of Education at the University of Wisconsin–Madison. WCER currently has extramural funding of approximately $40 million, and is home to over 500 faculty, staff, graduate and undergraduate students who are engaged in more than 100 research projects that investigate a variety of topics in education.

== Mission ==
Throughout its history, WCER has maintained a commitment to improving American education by studying varied learning environments and interventions and their effects on students. Of primary concern to this mission has been the question of how educational processes and social policy can best meet the needs of students from different cultural and educational backgrounds. WCER researchers have continually asked how educational "best practices" can be made more efficient, better supported, more strategic, and thus easier to implement.

== Notable faculty ==
- Courtney Bell became the director of WCER in 2020.
- Former WCER Director Adam Gamoran, is the president of the William T. Grant Foundation. He remains the John D. MacArthur Professor of Sociology and Educational Policy Studies.
- Gloria Ladson-Billings is an American pedagogical theorist and teacher educator on the faculty of the University of Wisconsin–Madison School of Education. She is known, among other things, for her groundbreaking work in the fields of Culturally Relevant Pedagogy and Critical race theory.
