= Deborah Stipek =

American psychologist

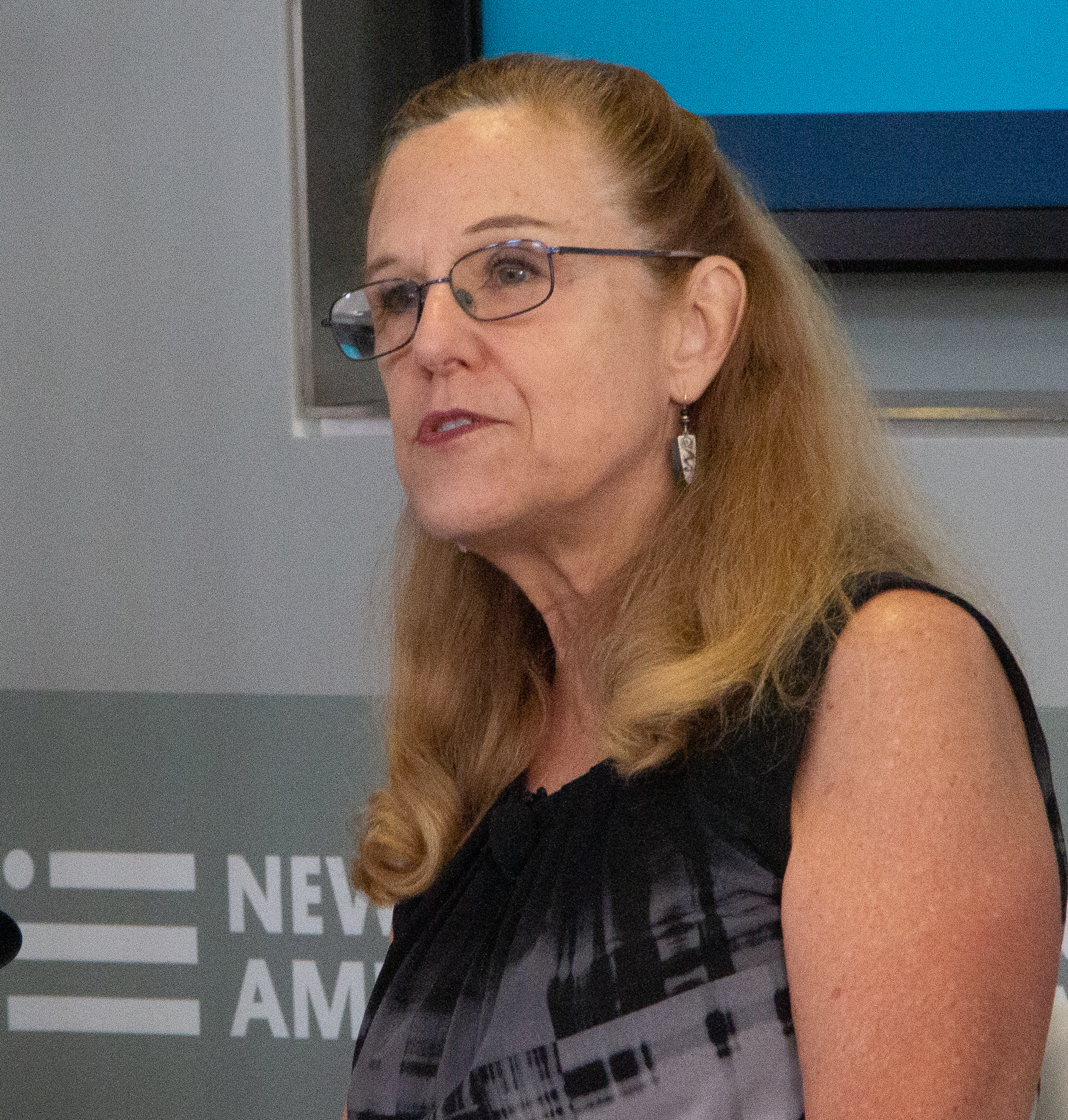
Stepek in 2019

Deborah Stipek is the Judy Koch Professor of Education at the Stanford University Graduate School of Education (GSE) and a professor by courtesy of psychology. She also serves as the Peter E. Haas Faculty Director of the Haas Center for Public Service at Stanford. From 2001 to 2012 and then again from 2014 to 2015 she served as the I James Quillen Dean of the GSE at Stanford. Prior to Stanford she was a faculty member at the University of California, Los Angeles (UCLA) School of Education, where she served for 10 of her 23 years as the director of the Corinne Seeds University Elementary School and the Urban Education Studies Center. During this time, she took a year off to work for U.S. Senator Bill Bradley.

== Education ==
Stipek holds a B.S. in psychology from the University of Washington (1972) and a Ph.D. in developmental psychology from Yale University (1977).

== Research ==
Stipek's scholarship focuses on instructional effects on children's achievement motivation and on best practices in early childhood education. She is particularly concerned about policies and practices that give children of color and children living in poverty the educational advantages of their more affluent peers. In addition to over 100 articles and chapters and several edited books, she has written two books on motivation, one targeting researchers and teachers (Motivation to Learn: Integrating Theory and Practice) and the other targeting parents (Motivated Minds: Raising Children Who Love Learning). She has also been involved in education policy at the federal and state level. She has chaired a task force for the state of California that will recommend new requirements for people who are authorized to teach young children.

== Professional service ==
Stipek served for five years on the Board on Children, Youth, and Families of the National Academy of Sciences and is a member of the National Academy of Education. She also chaired the National Academy of Sciences Committee on Increasing High School Students' Engagement & Motivation to Learn and the MacArthur Foundation Network on Teaching and Learning. She currently chairs the Heising-Simons Development and Research on Early Math Education Network.
