= Gloria Ladson-Billings =

American academic and writer (born 1947)

Gloria Jean Ladson-Billings FBA (born 1947) is an American pedagogical theorist and teacher educator known for her work in the fields of culturally relevant pedagogy and critical race theory, and the pernicious effects of systemic racism and economic inequality on educational opportunities. Her book The Dreamkeepers: Successful Teachers of African-American Children is a significant text in the field of education. Ladson-Billings is Professor Emerita and formerly the Kellner Family Distinguished Professor of Urban Education in the Department of Curriculum and Instruction at the University of Wisconsin–Madison.

Ladson-Billings served as president of the American Educational Research Association (AERA) in 2005–2006. During the 2005 AERA annual meeting in San Francisco, Ladson-Billings delivered her presidential address, "From the Achievement Gap to the Education Debt: Understanding Achievement in U.S. Schools", in which she outlined what she called the "education debt", highlighting the combination of historical, moral, socio-political, and economic factors that have disproportionately affected African-American, Latino, Asian, and other non-white students. In 2021 she was elected a corresponding fellow of the British Academy.

== Biography ==
Gloria Jean Ladson was born in Philadelphia, Pa. and was educated in the Philadelphia public school system. She obtained her B.S. in education at Morgan State University in 1968 and her M.Ed. in Curriculum and Instruction at the University of Washington in 1972. She went on to complete her PhD in Curriculum and Teacher Education at the Stanford Graduate School of Education in 1984. Her dissertation titled Citizenship and values: An ethnographic study of citizenship and values in a black school setting was conducted under the supervision of Richard E. Gross.

In 1995, Ladson-Billings became the first Black woman to be tenured as a professor in UW–Madison's School of Education. She also served as the Assistant Vice Chancellor of Academic Affairs prior to her retirement in January 2018. In 2015, Ladson-Billings was awarded the AERA Social Justice in Education Award. Other prestigious awards include the Lifetime Achievement Award from the Benjamin Banneker Association of the National Council for Teachers of Mathematics (2016), the Brock Prize for Education Innovation (2012), and the George and Louise Spindler Award from the Council on Anthropology and Education (2004). Ladson-Billings is an elected member of the National Academy of Education and the American Academy of Arts and Sciences.

== Education debt ==
Education debt is a theory developed by Ladson-Billings to attempt to explain the racial achievement gap. As defined by Professor Emeritus Robert Haveman, a colleague of hers, education debt is the "foregone schooling resources that we could have (should have) been investing in (primarily) low income kids, which deficit leads to a variety of social problems (e.g. crime, low productivity, low wages, low labor force participation) that require on-going public investment". The education debt theory has historical, economic, sociopolitical and moral components.

=== Historical component ===
Historical debt is the concept of inequality throughout history that has prevented equal education of minorities. Inequities surrounding education throughout history have been designed to prevent people based on their race, class, and gender from receiving quality education. It was prohibited by law in many places across the United States, specifically the south, for African Americans to attend school. As a cause of this lack of education, there were extremely high rate of illiteracy in the African-American community following the Civil War. Similarly, the Native American population was prevented from obtaining a quality education. After forced labor and genocides, the remaining population was funneled into boarding schools focused on religious teachings and assimilation into European culture. Latino/as were also denied equal education. In the case Mendez vs. West Minister, Latino fathers challenged the courts as their children, and thousands of others, were victims of racial segregation. The falsity that African Americans were unable to be educated was endorsed by Thomas Jefferson, even though he supported the idea of education for all American people.

=== Economic component ===
Economic debt has greatly accumulated from the disparities in school funding. Even after it was deemed unconstitutional for education to be withheld on the basis of race, legislation regarding the allocation of money for public schools was passed regardless of the fact that it left minority school districts with significantly less money than predominantly white school districts. The concept of separate but equal, made constitutional by Plessy vs. Ferguson, allowed a significant of amount of funding disparity between school districts to be perpetuated. Ladson-Billings also points to the fact that higher level of income is related to a higher level of education. The average white student completes college at a school that spends over $11,000 per student, while the average Black student completes college at a school that spends under $10,000 per student.

=== Sociopolitical component ===
Sociopolitical debt "is the degree to which communities of color are excluded from the civic process" (Ladson-Billings 2006). Disenfranchisement of voting rights contributed to and continues to contribute to sociopolitical debt. African American, Latino, and Native American communities were often excluded from legislation and conversation concerning education which did not allow them to advocate for the equal education. An example of the mitigation of sociopolitical debt is the Voting Rights Act of 1965. This piece of legislation ensured a voice to minorities within the political sphere. No such legislation has been passed that focuses on diminishing education inequalities. Affirmative action is the closest legislation that has had a strong impact. Although affirmative action benefited white women the most, observations show that the emergence of the Black middle class was aided by the policy.

=== Moral component ===
Moral debt is the final component of the education debt and "reflects disparity between what we know is right and what we actually do" (Ladson-Billings 2006). Moral debt is expressed as the lack of honor given when honor is due. There is no hesitation in giving honor to Martin Luther King Jr. or Rosa Parks. Another example of repaying moral debt are the reparations placed on Germany after WWII. Debate is happening on the basis of moral debt, reparations and success but much of the debate focuses on the individual and the responsibility of the individual to ensure success. "No nation can enslave a race of people for hundreds of years, set them free bedraggled and penniless, pit them, without assistance in a hostile environment, against privileged victimizers, and then reasonably expect the gap between the heirs of the two groups to narrow. Lines, begun parallel and left alone, can never touch." Randall Robinson states. Individual responsibility becomes an unrealistic expectation when a group has been exploited, disenfranchised and oppressed for centuries.

== Selected articles ==
- Ladson-Billings, G.J. (2005). Is the team all right? Diversity and teacher education. Journal of Teacher Education, 56(2), 229–234.
- Ladson-Billings, G.J. (1996). Silences as weapons: Challenges of a Black professor teaching white students. Theory Into Practice, 35(2), 79–85.
- Ladson-Billings, G.J. (1995). Toward a theory of culturally relevant pedagogy. American Education Research Journal, 35, 465–491.
- Ladson-Billings, G.J. (1995). Toward a critical race theory of education. Teachers College Record, 97, 47–68.
- Ladson-Billings, G.J. (1995). But that's just good teaching! The case for culturally relevant pedagogy. Theory Into Practice, 34:3, 159–165.

== Chapters in edited texts ==
- Ladson-Billings, G. (2000). Racialized discourses and ethnic epistemologies. N. Denzin & Y. Lincoln (eds). Handbook of Qualitative Research (Second edition) . Thousand Oaks, CA: Sage.
- Ladson-Billings, G.J. (1999). Just what is critical race theory and what's it doing in a nice field like education. In L. Parker, D. Deyhele, S. Villenas (Eds.) Race is…race isn't: Critical race theory and qualitative studies in education (7-30). Boulder, CO: Westview Press.

== Books ==
- Ladson-Billings, G.J. & Tate, W. (2006). Education research in the public interest: Social justice, action, and policy. New York, NY: Teachers College Press. ISBN 0-8077-4705-X
- Ladson-Billings, G.J. (2005). Beyond the big house: African American educators on teacher education. New York, NY: Teacher College Press. ISBN 0-8077-4581-2
- Ladson-Billings, G.J. (2001). Crossing over to Canaan: The journey of new teachers in diverse classrooms. San Francisco, CA: Jossey-Bass. ISBN 0-7879-5001-7
- Ladson-Billings, G.J. (1997). The dreamkeepers: Successful teachers of African-American children. San Francisco, CA: Jossey-Bass. ISBN 0-7879-0338-8
- Grant, C. & Ladson-Billings, G.J. [eds.] (1997). Dictionary of multicultural education. Phoenix, AZ: Oryx Press.

== Keynote and presidential addresses ==
- Ladson-Billings, G.J. (2006). Still_black@the_academy.edu. Keynote address at The National Council of Teachers of English Midwinter Research Assembly, Chicago, IL.
- Ladson-Billings, G.J. (2006). From the Achievement Gap to the Education Debt: Understanding Achievement in U.S. Schools. Presidential address at the American Educational Research Association Annual Meeting, San Francisco, CA.
- Ladson-Billings, G.J. (2008). Keynote speaker at the Wisconsin state Martin Luther King Day celebration in the state capitol rotunda at Madison.
- Ladson-Billings, G.J. (2016). Keynote speaker at the International Conference on Urban Education in San Juan, Puerto Rico.
