= Race Ethnicity and Education =

- Discipline: Ethnic studies, education
- Language: English
- Edited by: David Gillborn

Publication details
- History: 1998-present
- Publisher: Routledge
- Frequency: Biannual
- Impact factor: 1.257 (2016)

Standard abbreviations
- ISO 4: Race Ethn. Educ.

Indexing
- ISSN: 1361-3324
- OCLC no.: 974859515

Links
- Journal homepage; Online archive

Race Ethnicity and Education is a biannual peer-reviewed academic journal covering ethnic studies as it pertains to education. It was established in 1998 and is published by Routledge. It is supported by the American Educational Research Association's Critical Examination of Race, Ethnicity, Class and Gender in Education Special Interest Group, as well as by the British Educational Research Association's ’Race’ Ethnicity and Education Special Interest Group. The editor-in-chief is David Gillborn (UCL Institute of Education). According to the Journal Citation Reports, the journal has a 2016 impact factor of 1.257.
