= Andrew C. Porter =

Andrew Calvin Porter (born July 10, 1942) is the former Dean of the University of Pennsylvania Graduate School of Education and also serves as Penn GSE's George and Diane Weiss Professor of Education. Porter is an educational psychologist and psychometrician who has made significant contributions to education policy and has published widely on educational assessment and accountability, teacher decisions on content and how curriculum policy effects those decisions, opportunities for students to learn and achievement indicators, measuring content and standards alignment, teacher professional development, educational research methodology, and leadership assessment. Porter's current work centers on the VAL-ED project, a research-based evaluation tool that measures the effectiveness of school leaders by providing a detailed assessment of a principal's performance funded by the US Department of Education/IES. Porter also works on two projects funded by the National Science Foundation that focus on the effects of teacher professional development on improving teaching and learning.

Porter is a former president of the American Educational Research Association (2001) and was elected a member of the National Academy of Education in 1994, where he has served as vice president since 2005. He is a Lifetime National Associate of the National Academies and is a present or past member of a dozen scholarly editorial and advisory boards, including American Educational Researcher, Educational Researcher, Teachers College Record, and the Journal of Research on Educational Effectiveness. Porter is the co-author of 42 book chapters, 70 scholarly articles, dozens of technical reports, and one book.

From 1967 to 1988, Porter was a faculty member at Michigan State University, where he co-directed the Institute for Research on Teaching and served as associate dean for Research and Graduate Study. During this time, he also served as a visiting scholar at the National Institute of Education, where he created and was first chief of the Methodology and Measurement Division and later served as the associate director in charge of the Basic Skills Group. In 1988 Porter became the Anderson-Bascon professor of Educational Psychology at the University of Wisconsin–Madison, where he directed the Wisconsin Center for Education Research. In 2003, he joined the faculty of Vanderbilt University and served as the Patricia and Rodes Hart Professor of Leadership, Policy, and Organizations in the Peabody College of Education and Human Development and served as the director of Vanderbilt's Learning Sciences Institute.

Porter holds a B.S. in education from Indiana State University (1963) and an M.S. (1965) and Ph.D. (1967) in Educational Psychology from the University of Wisconsin–Madison.

Educational offices
Preceded by Susan Fuhrman	Dean of the University of Pennsylvania Graduate School of Education; 2007-2014	Succeeded by Pam Grossman

Educational offices
Preceded by Catherine E. Snow	President of the American Educational Research Association; 2002-2003	Succeeded by Robert L. Linn
