= Hilda Borko =

American psychologist

- Education: BA (1971), MA (1973), PhD (1978)
- Alma mater: University of California

Academic work
- Discipline: Psychology
- Sub-discipline: educational psychology
- Institutions: Stanford Graduate School of Education

Hilda Borko is an American educational psychologist who researches teacher cognition and changes in novice and experienced teachers' knowledge and beliefs. Her research explores teachers’ instructional practices, the process of learning to teach, the impact of teacher professional development programs on teachers and students, and the preparation of professional development leaders. Her work has identified factors that affect teachers' learning of reform-based practices. She is chair of the educational psychology program area in the school of education at the University of Colorado, and is a former president of the American Educational Research Association. Her university education (PhD 1978, MA 1973, BA 1971) was completed at the University of California.

She received her BA in psychology, her MA in philosophy education, and her PhD in educational psychology from the University of California, Los Angeles. Dr. Borko's research explores teacher learning, the impact of teacher professional development programs on teachers and students, and collaborative partnership research in education.

She is the 2014 recipient of the Excellence in Scholarship in Mathematics Teacher Education Award, Association of Mathematics Teacher Educators.

Her current projects include partnerships with local school districts to improve teaching and professional development in mathematics and science, with a focus on ensuring robust learning opportunities for all students. She is also leading an international study of mathematics teacher collaboration for the International Commission on Mathematics Instruction.

Her publications include articles in Journal of Mathematical Behavior, ZDM Mathematics Education, Journal of Research in Science Teaching, Educational Researcher, American Educational Research Journal and other journals and edited volumes. Hilda Borko has 151 publications as well as 100,000+ reads, some have been listed below.

Fishman, Evan J., Borko, H., Osborne J., Gomez Zaccarelli, F., Rafanelli, S., Reigh, E., Tseng A., Million, S., Berson, E. (2017). A Practice-Based Professional Development Program to Support Scientific Argumentation From Evidence in the Elementary Classroom. Journal of Science Teacher Education. doi: 10.1080/1046560X.2017.1302727

Horn, I., Lewis, C., Friedkin, S., Garner, B., Ehrenfeld, N., Carlson, J., Borko, H., Fong, A., Shaughnessy, M., & Garcia, N. (2020). Building a Theory of Teacher Learning, Together.

Boles, K., Jarry-Shore, M., Villa, A., Malamut, J., & Borko, H. (2020). Building Capacity Via Facilitator Agency: Tensions in Implementing an Adaptive Model of Professional Development.

Koellner, K., Jacobs, J., Borko, H., & Seago, N. (2022). Current trends, tensions and unresolved issues in research on teacher professional learning. International Encyclopedia of Education: Fourth Edition, 550-561.

Educational offices
| Preceded by Robert L. Linn | President of the American Educational Research Association; 2003–2004 | Succeeded by Marilyn Cochran-Smith |
