= J. Douglas Willms =

Canadian academic

Dr. J. Douglas Willms
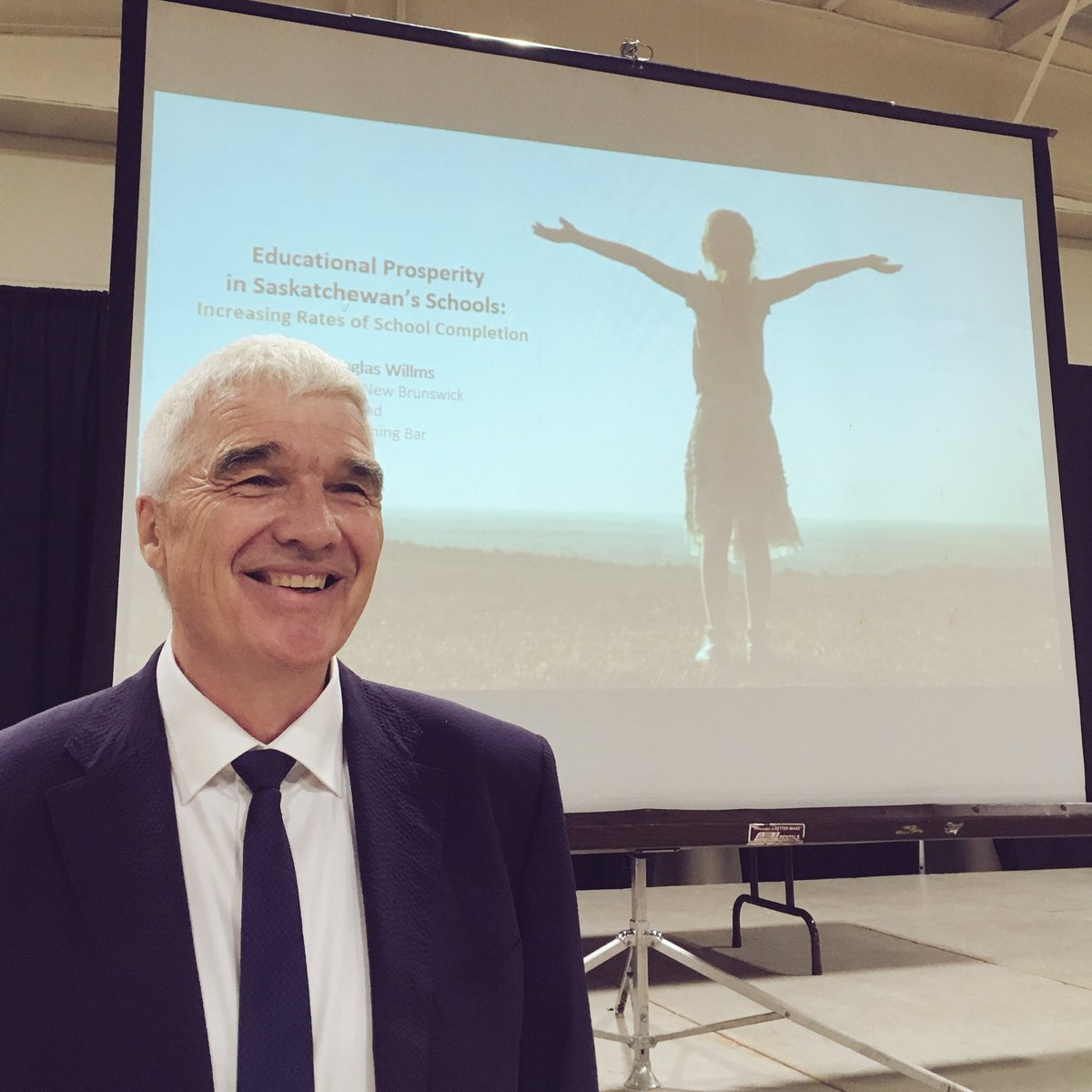
- Willms in 2017
- Other names: J. D. Willms, Douglas Willms
- Title: Canada Research Chair in Literacy and Human Development

Academic background
- Education: Stanford University, University of British Columbia, Royal Military College of Canada

Academic work
- Discipline: Literacy and Human Development
- Sub-discipline: Student assessment, school composition, student achievement, monitoring school performance
- Institutions: University of New Brunswick, University of British Columbia, University of Edinburgh
- Notable works: Vulnerable Children: Findings from Canada's National Longitudinal Survey of Children and Youth

J. Douglas Willms is the Founder and President of The Learning Bar Inc. He is a member of the US National Academy of Education, Past-President of the International Academy of Education and a Fellow of the Royal Society of Canada. From 1995 to 2018, Willms was Professor of Education at the University of New Brunswick, where for eight years he held the Canadian Institute for Advanced Research Chair in Human Development and for fourteen years held the Tier 1 Canada Research Chair in Literacy and Human Development.

Willms graduated from the Royal Military College of Canada in 1972 with a B.Eng. in Engineering Physics, and after a brief career as an officer in the Canadian Armed Forces he pursued a career in education. He received a teaching certificate in Special Education (1975) and an M.A. in Educational Psychology (1978) from the University of British Columbia. He subsequently taught at the elementary, secondary and university levels before pursuing further graduate training at Stanford University, where he received an M.Sc. in Statistics (1980), an Educational Specialist degree in Program Evaluation (1981), and a Ph.D. in Education (1983). From 1983 to 1995 he held various positions at the University of Edinburgh, where he became an Honorary Senior Research Fellow in 1988, and at the University of British Columbia where he became Professor in 1993. Throughout his career, Willms has been a regular consultant with the World Bank, OECD, UNESCO, Inter-American Development Bank and Statistics Canada. In 2004, Willms co-founded The Learning Bar Inc., with the aim of bringing his research on children's development and assessment into widespread practice. The company employs over 70 staff in its Canadian and Australian offices, providing research and assessment services in several countries worldwide. The company's flagship products are the Early Years Evaluation, Confident Learners, and the OurSCHOOL / Tell Them From Me suite of school surveys.

== Research ==
Willms's research contributions span four decades with publications in the areas of child development, children's health, youth literacy, the accountability of schooling systems and the assessment of national reforms. His recent research included the development of an assessment framework called Educational Prosperity, which sets out a small, coherent set of metrics for assessing child and youth development from conception to late adolescence. The framework was adopted by the OECD for its study, PISA for Development and is now being used in nine countries.

== Selected publications ==
- Willms, J. D., & Tramonte, L. (2019). The measurement and use of socioeconomic status in educational research. In L. E. Suter, B. Denman, & E. Smith (eds), The SAGE Handbook of Comparative Studies in Education (pp. 293-303). London: Sage.
- Willms, J. D. (2018). Learning Divides: Using Monitoring Data to Inform Education Policy. Montreal: UNESCO Institute for Statistics.
- Willms, J. D. with Tramonte, L., Laurie, R., López, A. Y., Durepos, D. (2015). Design and composition of contextual questionnaires for the PISA for Development Study. Fredericton, Canada: The Learning Bar.
- Willms, J. D. & Tramonte, L. (2014). Towards the Development of Contextual Questionnaires for the PISA for Development Study. Report prepared for the Organization of Economic Cooperation and Development. Paris: OECD.
- Willms, J. D. (2010). School Composition and Contextual Effects on Student Outcomes. Teachers College Record, 112(4), 1008-1037.
- Tramonte, L. & Willms, J. D. (2010). Cultural capital and its effects on education outcomes. Economics of Education Review, 29(2), 200-213.
- Willms, J. D., Smith, T. M., Zhang, Y., & Tramonte, L. (2006). Raising and levelling the learning bar in Central and Eastern Europe. Prospects, XXXVI(4), 411-418.
- Willms, J. D. (2004). Early childhood obesity: A call for early surveillance and preventive measures. Canadian Medical Association Journal, 171(3), 243-244.
- Willms, J. D. (2003). Student engagement at school: A sense of belonging and participation. : Organization for Economic Cooperation and Development.
- Willms, J. D. (Ed.). (2002). Vulnerable Children: Findings from Canada’s National Longitudinal Survey of Children and Youth. Edmonton, AB: University of Alberta Press.
- Tremblay, M. S., & Willms, J. D. (2000). Secular trends in body mass index of Canadian children. Canadian Medical Association Journal, 163(11), 1429-1433.
- Boyle, M. H. & Willms, J. D. (1999). Place effects for areas defined by administrative boundaries. American Journal of Epidemiology, 149(6), 577-585.
- Raudenbush, S. W. & Willms, J. D. (1995). The estimation of school effects. Journal of Educational and Behavioral Statistics, 20(4), 307-335.
- Willms, J. D. & Kerckhoff, A. C. (1995). The challenge of developing new social indicators. Educational Evaluation and Policy Analysis, 17(1), 113-131.
- Willms, J. D. (1992). Monitoring school performance: A guide for educators. Lewes: Falmer Press.
- Raudenbush, S. W. & Willms, J. D. (Eds.). (1991). Schools, classrooms and pupils: International studies of schooling from the multilevel perspective. New York: Academic Press.
- Willms, J. D. & Raudenbush, S. W. (1989). A longitudinal hierarchical linear model for estimating school effects and their stability. Journal of Educational Measurement, 26(3), 209-232.
- McPherson, A. F. & Willms, J. D. (1987). Equalization and improvement: Some effects of comprehensive reorganization in Scotland. Sociology, 21(4), 509-539.
- Willms, J. D. (1986). Social class segregation and its relationship to pupils’ examination results in Scotland. American Sociological Review, 51, 224-241.
