= Review of Educational Research =

- Discipline: Education, education research
- Language: English
- Edited by: Mildred Boveda, Karly S. Ford, Erica Frankenberg, Francesca Lopez

Publication details
- History: Since 1931
- Publisher: SAGE Publications on behalf of the American Educational Research Association
- Frequency: Bimonthly
- Open access: Hybrid
- Impact factor: 7.4 (2024)

Standard abbreviations
- ISO 4: Rev. Educ. Res.

Indexing
- CODEN: REDRAB
- ISSN: 0034-6543 (print); 1935-1046 (web)
- LCCN: 33019994
- OCLC no.: 1588319

Links
- Journal homepage; Online access; Online archive; Journal page at association's website

The Review of Educational Research is a bimonthly peer-reviewed review journal published by SAGE Publications on behalf of the American Educational Research Association. It was established in 1931 and covers all aspects of education and educational research. The journal's co-editors are Mildred Boveda, Karly Sarita Ford, Erica Frankenberg, and Francesca López (Pennsylvania State University).

== Description ==
The journal publishes reviews of research literature bearing on education in any discipline, such as psychology, sociology, history, philosophy, political science, economics, computer science, statistics, anthropology, and biology. It does not publish original empirical research.

== History ==
The journal was established in 1931 as the associiation's second publication with the goal of "serv[ing] as a record of advancements within the field of education, broadly defined". To this end, it focused on providing an organized review of research in key areas of education, namely curriculum, learning, teacher preparation, educational administration, higher education, education theory, and policy. The major research for each topic was to be reviewed in themed issues of the journal over the course of a three-year time span, with a change in the editorial board every three years to coincide with the start of each new cycle. In this way, the editors planned to cover the "whole field" of educational topics during their tenure, and submissions were solicited by the editors from specific researchers. During the first three years, reviews were designed to catch readers up on relevant research in each topic, and so provided less in terms of synthesis or analysis, but rather read more like a list of studies. However, after the first three-year cycle, reviews focused mainly on the previous three years since the last review on that topic, and more discussion and evaluation were possible.

In 1970, the journal underwent a fundamental change in structure, when the editorial board decided that its goals could at that time "best be achieved by pursuing a policy of publishing unsolicited reviews of research on topics of the contributor's choosing."

== Abstracting and indexing ==
The journal is abstracted and indexed in EBSCO databases, Current Contents/Social & Behavioral Sciences, ProQuest databases, PsycINFO, SafetyLit, Scopus, and the Social Sciences Citation Index. According to the Journal Citation Reports, the journal has a 2024 impact factor of 7.4, ranking it 9th in the category "Education & Educational Research".
