= Michigan State University College of Education =

Coordinates: 42°43′37.4″N 84°28′45.4″W

MSU College of Education
- Motto: Come prepared to learn. Leave prepared to lead.
- Dean: Robert Floden
- Faculty: 130
- Administrative staff: 133
- Location: East Lansing, Michigan, United States
- Campus: MSU
- Website: MSU College of Education Web page

The College of Education at Michigan State University (MSU) has four departments that offer doctoral, graduate, undergraduate and online courses:

- Department of Counseling, Educational Psychology and Special Education (CEPSE)
- Department of Educational Administration (EAD)
- Department of Kinesiology (KIN)
- Department of Teacher Education (TE)

The MSU College of Education is located in East Lansing, MI and is the primary education school of MSU.

== History ==
Michigan State University established its first formal course in education in 1902 called the "History of Education." Over the next fifty years, the Department of Education grew in course offerings and faculty, and became the School of Education in 1952. The next year, in 1953, the school recruited its first dean, Clifford Erickson. That same year, the Department of Physical Education also became part of the school. In 1985, the College established the National Center for Research on Teacher Education (NCRTE).

The college instituted year-long teaching internships in 1993. At the time of its inception, MSU was the only program in Michigan and one of the few nationwide that requires a yearlong teaching internship in a public school.

The college introduced cohort-based models for future teacher educators in the early 2000s. The Urban Educators Cohort Program launched in 2006 and the Global Educators Cohort Program launched in 2008.

The college's current dean, Jerlando F. L. Jackson, was appointed in 2022.

== Rankings ==
Michigan State University regularly ranks among the top programs nationwide in the U.S. News & World Report's annual rankings of graduate schools of education. In 2024, MSU celebrated 30 consecutive years at #1 in the nation for elementary and secondary teaching education programs.

MSU also ranks highly in programs for Kinesiology. In 2023, the National Academy of Kinesiology listed MSU's doctoral program in Kinesiology as #11 in the nation.
