= William G. Tierney =

American scholar of higher education

William G. Tierney is an American scholar of higher education. He earned a master's degree from Harvard University and holds a Ph.D. from Stanford University in administration and policy analysis. He has had Fulbright Fellowships Scholarships to Latin America and Australia. He also was Scholar-in-Residence at Universiti Sains Malaysia. Tierney served as president of the Association for the Study of Higher Education (ASHE) from 2001 to 2002 and as president of the American Educational Research Association (AERA) from 2012 to 2013. He is currently University Professor, Wilbur-Kieffer Professor of Higher Education and Co-Director of the Pullias Center for Higher Education at the University of Southern California.

Tierney is the author of a self-published academic novel, Academic Affairs: A Love Story.
