= Airports Economic Regulatory Authority =

Indian government agency

- Abbreviation: AERA
- Formation: 12 May 2009; 17 years ago
- Chairperson: S. K. G. Rahate
- Website: aera.gov.in

Airports Economic Regulatory Authority (AERA) is a regulatory agency under Government of India to regulate tariff and other expenditure and fees for major airports. It is a statutory body constituted under the Airports Economic Regulatory Authority of India Act (AERA), 2008.

== Functions ==
It works according to the provisions of the AERA Act 2008. It regulates tariffs and fees charged to airports and passengers and monitors the quality of service.
