= David Figlio =

American economist

- Born: October 14, 1970 (age 55)
- Children: Sunshine Figlio, Elizabeth Figlio

Academic background
- Education: University of Wisconsin-Madison
- Thesis: Property Tax Limitations, School Services, and Education Production (1995)
- Doctoral advisor: John Karl Scholz

Academic work
- Discipline: Economics, education policy
- Institutions: University of Rochester

David Nicholas Figlio (born October 14, 1970) is the Gordon Fyfe Professor of Economics at the University of Rochester in Rochester, New York. He is an American economist who formerly served as the Dean of the School of Education and Social Policy at Northwestern University. He also served as the Orrington Lunt Professor of Education and Social Policy and is the former director of Northwestern's Institute for Policy Research.

He is known for studying school accountability and school choice, immigrants in schools, economics of the family, the relationship between early health and later life outcomes, and topics in higher education. He also has studied the relationship between children's names and their later educational outcomes. He served as editor-in-chief of the Journal of Human Resources. In 2017, he was elected to the National Academy of Education.

In January 2022, Figlio was named the Provost and Chief Academic Officer of University of Rochester in Rochester, New York. He started his tenure at University of Rochester in June 2022. On June 9, 2024, he announced his resignation as Provost of the University of Rochester, effective August 2024.
