= Richard Elmore =

American academic and professor of education

- Born: Richard Frazier Elmore; 2 March 1944; Spokane, Washington
- Died: February 2021 (aged 76)

Academic work
- Institutions: Harvard Graduate School of Education
- Main interests: Education, instructional rounds

Richard Frazier Elmore (March 2, 1944 – February 2021) was the Gregory R. Anrig Research Professor of Educational Leadership in the Harvard Graduate School of Education, where he taught for 24 years commencing in 1990. Professor Elmore was known for his modes of learning framework, and instructional rounds.

== Selected bibliography ==
- Elmore, Richard F. (1986). "Graduate education in public management: working the seams of government". Journal of Policy Analysis and Management. 6 (1): 69–83. doi:10.1002/pam.4050060107.
- Elmore, Richard F.; Watson, Sara; Pfeiffer, David (1992). "A case for including disability policy issues in public policy curricula". Journal of Policy Analysis and Management (Curriculum and Case Notes). 11 (1): 167–173. doi:10.2307/3325146. JSTOR 3325146.
