= Review of Research in Education =

- Discipline: Education, education research
- Language: English
- Edited by: Ronald A. Beghetto, Yong Zhao (2022 and 2024), Vivan L. Gadsden, David Osher (2023 and 2025)

Publication details
- History: 1973-present
- Publisher: SAGE Publications on behalf of the American Educational Research Association
- Frequency: Annual
- Impact factor: 6.4 (2022)

Standard abbreviations
- ISO 4: Rev. Res. Educ.

Indexing
- ISSN: 0091-732X (print); 1935-1038 (web)
- LCCN: 72089719
- OCLC no.: 300409743

Links
- Journal homepage; Online archive; Journal page at association's website

Review of Research in Education is a peer-reviewed academic journal published by SAGE Publications on behalf of the American Educational Research Association. It covers research in the field of education. The editors-in-chief for 2022 and 2024 are Ronald A. Beghetto (Arizona State University) and Yong Zhao (University of Kansas). The 2023 and 2025 editors are Vivian L. Gadsden (University of Pennsylvania) and David Osher (American Institutes for Research). It was established in 1973. The 2021 editors are Greg Kazinsky, Ethan Paterson, and Robbert Snow.

== Mission statement ==
Review of Research in Education (RRE), published annually, provides an overview and descriptive analysis of selected topics of relevant research literature through critical and synthesizing essays. RRE promotes discussion and controversy about research problems in addition to pulling together and summarizing the work in a field.

== Abstracting and indexing ==
The journal is abstracted and indexed in Scopus and the Social Sciences Citation Index. According to the Journal Citation Reports, its 2022 impact factor is 6.4, ranking it 13th out of 268 journals in the category "Education & Educational Research".
