= Educational Researcher =

- Discipline: Education, educational research
- Language: English
- Edited by: Thurston Domina, Andrew McEachin, Dana Thompson Dorsey, Sarah Woulfin

Publication details
- History: 1972-present
- Publisher: SAGE Publications on behalf of the American Educational Research Association (United States)
- Frequency: 9/year
- Impact factor: 8.2 (2022)

Standard abbreviations
- ISO 4: Educ. Res.

Indexing
- ISSN: 0013-189X (print); 1935-102X (web)
- LCCN: 87657066
- OCLC no.: 56209028

Links
- Journal homepage; Submission guidelines; Online archive; Journal page at association's website

Educational Researcher is a peer-reviewed academic journal that covers the field of education. The editors-in-chief are Thurston Domina (University of North Carolina, Chapel Hill), Andrew McEachin (NWEA), Dana Thompson Dorsey (University of South Florida), and Sarah Woulfin (University of Texas at Austin). It was established in 1972 and is published by SAGE Publications on behalf of the American Educational Research Association.

== Mission statement ==
Educational Researcher (ER) publishes scholarly articles of general significance to the education research community from various areas of education research and related disciplines. ER aims to make major programmatic research and new findings of broad importance widely accessible.

== Abstracting and indexing ==
The journal is abstracted and indexed in Scopus and the Social Sciences Citation Index. According to the Journal Citation Reports, its 2022 impact factor is 8.2, ranking it 7th out of 268 journals in the category "Education and Educational Research".
