= American Educational Resources Association =

Education resources organization

The American Educational Resources Association (AERA) is an education trade association based in the United States. According to the group's website, it was founded in 1916, and is research focused. The group publishes, issues awards, and holds meetings. The group is located in Washington, DC. The group has a site on Common Core Standards

The group's publications have included Review of Education Research.

As of August 2026, the group’s executive director is Tabbye M. Chavous.
