= William H. Angoff =

American research scientist

- Born: September 14, 1919; Boston, Massachusetts, U.S.
- Died: January 5, 1993 (aged 73); Princeton, New Jersey, U.S.
- Education: Harvard University; Purdue University
- Occupation: Research scientist
- Employer: Educational Testing Service
- Spouse: Eleanor Angoff
- Children: 1 son, 1 daughter

William H. Angoff (September 14, 1919 – January 5, 1993) was an American research scientist. He worked for the Educational Testing Service (ETS), where he helped improve the SAT and authored books about testing.

== Early life ==
Angoff was born on September 14, 1919, in Boston, Massachusetts. He graduated from Harvard University and earned a master's degree followed by a PhD from Purdue University.

== Career ==
Angoff first worked as a psychological testing expert for the United States Army during World War II.

Angoff worked for the Educational Testing Service (ETS) from 1950 to 1993. He became the director of developmental research in 1976. Over the course of his career, he helped improve the SAT, an exam taken by millions of American high school graduates. He also promoted the use of testing in his speeches and writing. He created the Angoff method with help from a colleague, which is a popular method for finding the grading scale on standardized tests.

== Personal life and death ==
With his wife Eleanor, Angoff had a son and a daughter. They resided in Princeton, New Jersey.

Angoff died of a heart attack on January 5, 1993, in Princeton.

== Selected works ==
- Angoff, William H.; Huddleston, Edith Mary (1958). The Multi-level Experiment: A Study of a Two-level Test System for the College Board Scholastic Aptitude Test. Princeton, New Jersey: Educational Testing Service. OCLC 19297063.
- Angoff, William H.; Sharon, Amiel T. (1972). Patterns of Test and Item Difficulty for Six Foreign Language Groups on the Test of English as a Foreign Language. Princeton, New Jersey: Educational Testing Service. OCLC 6041289.
- Angoff, William H. (1984). Scales, Norms, and Equivalent Scores. Princeton, New Jersey: Educational Testing Service. OCLC 11235274.
- Angoff, William H. (1987). Philosophical Issues of Current Interest to Measurement Theorists. Princeton, New Jersey: Educational Testing Service. OCLC 21858166.
- Angoff, William H. (1989). Context Bias in the Test of English as a Foreign Language. Princeton, New Jersey: Educational Testing Service. OCLC 863188811.
