= Critical Race Studies in Education Association =

American interdisciplinary organization

The Critical Race Studies in Education Association is an American interdisciplinary organization dedicated to the study of critical race theory and the promotion of racial justice in education. It was founded in 2007 and has held a conference annually since then.
