= American Educational Research Journal =

- Discipline: Educational research
- Language: English
- Edited by: Ellen Goldring, Angela Calabrese-Barton, Sean Kelly, Madeline Mavrogordato, Paul Poteat, Peter Youngs

Publication details
- History: 1964 - present
- Publisher: SAGE Publications on behalf of the American Educational Research Association
- Frequency: Bimonthly
- Impact factor: 3.6 (2022)

Standard abbreviations
- ISO 4: Am. Educ. Res. J.

Indexing
- ISSN: 0002-8312 (print); 1935-1011 (web)
- LCCN: 64009394
- OCLC no.: 1479801

Links
- Journal homepage; Submission guidelines; Online archive; Journal page at association's website

The American Educational Research Journal is a peer-reviewed academic journal that covers the field of educational research. The editors are Ellen Goldring (Vanderbilt University), Angela Calabrese-Barton (University of Michigan), Sean Kelly (University of Pittsburgh), Madeline Mavrogordato (Michigan State University), Paul Poteat (Boston College), and Peter Youngs (University of Virginia). The managing editor is Kristin S. Anderson (Vanderbilt University). It was established in 1964 and is currently published by SAGE Publications on behalf of the American Educational Research Association.

== Abstracting and indexing ==
The journal is abstracted and indexed in Scopus and the Social Sciences Citation Index. According to the Journal Citation Reports, its 2022 impact factor is 3.6.
