= American Educational Research Association =

Professional association

- Formation: 1916; 110 years ago
- Headquarters: 1430 K Street; Washington, D.C., U.S.
- Members: 25,000+ (as of 2025)
- 2026–2027 President: Jerome Morris
- Executive Director: Tabbye M. Chavous
- Website: www.aera.net

The American Educational Research Association (AERA) is an organization representing education researchers in the United States.

Founded in 1915, the organization represents a range of disciplines, including: education, psychology, statistics, sociology, history, economics, philosophy, anthropology, and political science.

AERA reports a membership of approximately 25,000 education researchers including scientists, teachers, students, administrators, and policy professionals.

According to the organization, its goal is to advance knowledge about education and promote the use of research in educational practices both nationally and abroad.

== Early history ==
Originally known as the National Association of Directors of Educational Research, AERA was founded in New York in 1915. It was founded by eight individuals as an interest group within the National Education Association Department of Superintendence. Early on, the organization mainly focused on testing students educational achievement. Membership grew as more faculty members from colleges of education nationwide joined and diversified the organization's research. In 1931, AERA became a department of the National Education Association. The association's eight founders: Burdette R. Buckingham, Albert Shiels, Leonard P. Ayres, Frank W. Ballou, Stuart A. Courtis, Edwin Hebden, George Melcher, and Joseph P. O'Hern – were all directors of education research in various parts of the United States. They met at the 1915 NEA Department of Superintendence annual meeting and proposed the establishment of an organization to advance educational research. Their constitution was approved the following year.

Early topics of interest for the AERA included research bureau operations, measurement techniques, and particular school situations. Active membership in the early association was reserved for research bureau directors and their assistants. The association's early years revolved around the annual convention, but it also published an internal quarterly newsletter, the Educational Research Bulletin.

By the end of World War I in 1918, the association had 36 active members and four honorary members. Its influence on public policy grew, visible in the school districts which began altering student coursework and education practices as a result of standardized tests. Mental testing developments, primarily psychometrics as a result of the First World War, new sub-fields of education, and the growth of education research at the post-secondary level challenged the association to widen its mission. The association opened its membership to include anyone who could demonstrate their competence as a researcher, as evidenced by their published or unpublished work. In 1922, members voted to adopt the name Educational Research Association of America to represent their goal of increasing membership of American education researchers. According to the AERA, over the years that followed, membership saw an increase, particularly among university personnel which grew from 48% to 69% between the years 1923 and 1927.

The association's original publication, the Journal of Educational Research, began in 1919.

The ability of education research to guide education practitioners was a struggle throughout the association's beginnings, with only ambiguous known relationships between testing and learning outcomes. The association recognized the need to establish theoretical foundations for the field of education research.

In 1928, the association changed its name to its current one as the American Educational Research Association.

During the Great Depression, the association's public school affiliates struggled with tight budgets and uncertain employment, but at the same time, university education researchers dominated the field and emerged as a unique social entity. AERA officials grew their relationships with like-minded associations, and a new journal, the Review of Educational Research, began as a reference work, summarizing recent studies since 1931. While early topics in Review of Educational Research focused primarily on education psychology and administration, the publication broadened its coverage in the mid-1930s in response to diversification in the field.

The role of education research in the progressive education movement was a source of contention between education researchers, some of whom felt that it should play an active role in policy issues, and others who felt that it should be used primarily for professional discourse. As the field continued to advance, much of the knowledge did not translate into practice, an issue that is still widely debated today. These divisions in the field made it difficult for education researchers to speak with one voice. Just prior to World War II, the Review of Educational Research made the case that because science could not speak to goals and choices, education research should contribute as one important source of the many shaping American education.

== Publications ==
AERA publishes books and reports, along with sponsoring seven peer-reviewed journals:

- AERA Open
- American Educational Research Journal
- Educational Evaluation and Policy Analysis
- Educational Researcher
- Journal of Educational and Behavioral Statistics (published jointly with the American Statistical Association)
- Review of Educational Research
- Review of Research in Education

== Events ==
AERA's Annual Meeting, held every spring, is one of the largest gathering of scholars in the education research field. The five-day conference includes presentations of research studies across education disciplines at all levels. The average number of attendees from 2007 to 2017 was 14,967 attendees.

AERA also hosts the annual Brown Lecture in Education Research which highlights the role of research in advancing equality in education. The first Brown Lecture was held in 2004 to commemorate the 50th anniversary of the Brown v. Board of Education decision.

== Education research and policy ==
AERA participates in the open access movement. AERA currently offers Educational Researcher (journal) open access, as well as an Online Paper Repository and i-Presentation Gallery containing presentations from the 2010 Annual Meeting forward. An open access, peer-reviewed journal, AERA Open, launched in 2014.

On the policy front, AERA is involved in revisions to the common rule. Executive Director Felice J. Levine served on the National Research Council committee charged with reviewing proposed regulations. The committee published its report in early 2014.

AERA had helped to lead the social science research community to increase federal funding for education research, particularly research in the social and behavioral sciences.

AERA selects and appoints scholars as AERA Fellows in a process based on peer nominations. This is an effort to convene researchers who are recognized for their contributions and contribute to the advancement of educational research.

In addition, AERA was active in the reauthorization of the Institute of Education Sciences bill, Strengthening Education through Research Act, which was advanced by the United States House Committee on Education and the Workforce in April 2014.

== Education research initiatives ==
AERA is involved in several education research initiatives, ranging from specific advocacy topics to supporting projects that serve the larger community. AERA supports the Education Research Conferences Program, which awards grants for conferences on selected research topics. AERA's Education Research Service Projects is designed to encourage researchers to offer their expertise to organizations and groups who may have a need but not the funds to engage their assistance.

== Affirmative action court cases ==
AERA participated in several U.S. court cases related to affirmative action by submitting amicus curiae briefs. One example is in 2013, AERA had submitted an amicus brief in Fisher v. University of Texas addressing the use of education research in evaluating race-conscious admissions policies. The association submitted a further amicus brief on affirmative action in December 2015.

In 2022, AERA submitted an amicus brief to the U.S. Supreme Court in the cases of Students for Fair Admissions, Inc., v. President & Fellows of Harvard College, and Students for Fair Admissions, Inc., v. University of North Carolina, et al. supporting the consideration of race in admissions policies.
