= List of educational psychologists =

The following is a list of academicians, both past and present, who are widely renowned for their groundbreaking contributions to the field of educational psychology.

== A ==
- Patricia Alexander
- John Robert Anderson (born 1947)
- Richard C. Anderson (born 1934)
- Chris Argyris (1923–2013)
- Elliot Aronson
- Richard C. Atkinson (born 1929)
- David Ausubel (1918–2008)

== B ==
- Albert Bandura (1925–2021)
- Russell Barkley
- Carl Bereiter
- David Berliner
- Ellen Bialystok
- John B. Biggs
- Alfred Binet (1857–1911)
- Benjamin Bloom (1913–1999)
- Guy Bond
- Hilda Borko
- Ann Brown (1943–1999)
- Jerome Bruner (1915–2016)

== C ==
- Donald T. Campbell (1916–1996)
- Idit Harel Caperton (born 1958)
- John Bissell Carroll (1916–2003)
- Nancy Cole
- Allan Collins
- Lee Cronbach (1916–2001)

== D ==
- John Dewey (1859–1952)
- Andrea diSessa
- Stewart Donaldson

== E ==
- Robert L. Ebel (born 1942)
- Kieran Egan
- Noel Entwistle
- Dorothy Espelage (born 1968)

== F ==
- Charles Ferster (1922–1981)
- Reuven Feuerstein (1921–2014)
- John H. Flavell (born 1928)

== G ==
- Nathaniel Gage (1917–2008)
- Robert M. Gagné (1916–2002)
- Howard Gardner (born 1943)
- David C. Geary
- Robert Glaser
- Gene V. Glass (born 1940)
- Anthony Gregorc
- Loren Grey (1915–2007)

== H ==
- G. Stanley Hall (1844–1924)
- Diane F. Halpern
- Karen R. Harris
- Michael Hogg
- John L. Holland
- Klaus Holzkamp (1927–1995)
- Lois Holzman
- J. McVicker Hunt

== J ==
- William James (1842–1910)
- Arthur Jensen (1923–2012)
- Charles Hubbard Judd (1873–1946)

== K ==
- Alan S. Kaufman (born 1944)
- Kenneth Koedinger (born 1962)
- Lawrence Kohlberg (1927–1987)
- David A. Kolb (born 1939)
- David Krathwohl

== L ==
- Nadine Lambert (1926–2006)
- Jean Lave
- Aleksei N. Leontiev (1903–1979)
- Alan Lesgold
- Robert L. Linn

== M ==
- Herbert W. Marsh
- Ferenc Marton (born 1939)
- Richard Mayer
- Maria Montessori (1870–1952)

== N ==
- Lilli Nielsen (1926–2013)

== O ==
- Angela O'Donnell
- Joy Osofsky

== P ==
- Gordon Pask (1928–1996)
- Roy Pea
- Eva Bendix Petersen
- Jean Piaget (1896–1980)
- Paul Pintrich (1953–2003)

== R ==
- Joseph Renzulli (born 1936)
- Lauren Resnick
- James Rest
- Cecil Reynolds
- Carl Rogers (1902–1987)

== S ==
- Roger Säljö (born 1948)
- Gavriel Salomon
- Marlene Scardamalia
- Dale Schunk
- Michael Scriven (born 1928)
- Carl Seashore (1866–1949)
- Marilyn Mailman Segal
- Richard Shavelson
- Michael Shonrock (born 1957)
- Lee Shulman
- Herbert A. Simon
- B. F. Skinner
- Victor Skumin (born 1948)
- Robert Slavin
- Catherine E. Snow
- Charles Spearman
- Julian Stanley
- Robert Sternberg
- Deborah J. Stipek
- Patrick Suppes
- John Sweller

== T ==
- Lewis Terman
- Edward Thorndike
- Robert L. Thorndike
- David Tzuriel

== V ==
- Ernst von Glasersfeld (1917–2010)
- Lev Vygotsky

== W ==
- David Wechsler
- Bernard Weiner
- Cassandra B. Whyte
- William Winn
- Philip Winne

== Z ==
- Caroline Beaumont Zachry
- Barry Zimmerman
