= Reinhard Pekrun =

German Educational Researcher and Psychologist

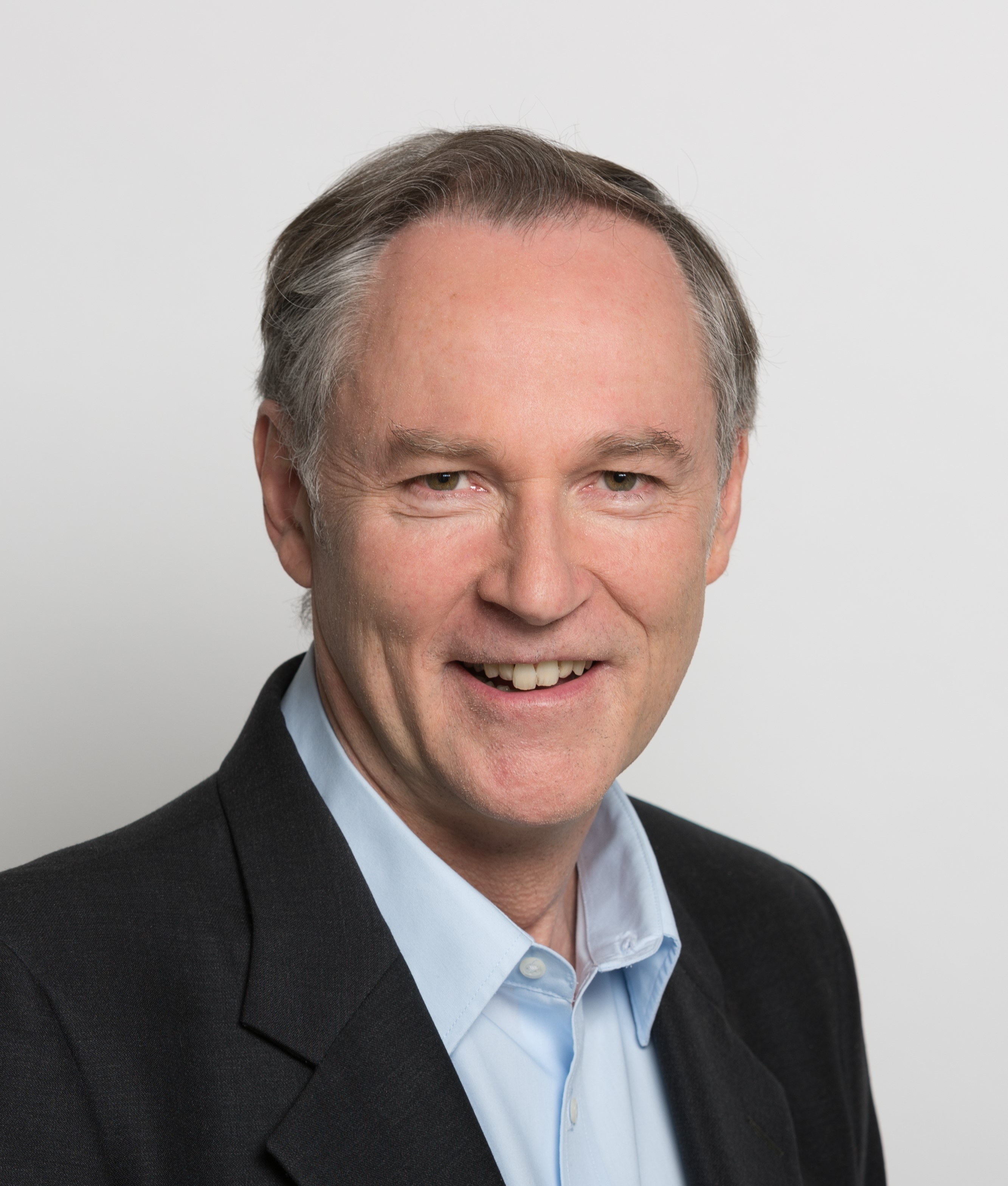

Reinhard Pekrun (born 1952, Braunschweig, Germany) is a psychological scientist and educational researcher best known for his research on achievement emotions. He is a professor at the University of Essex, United Kingdom, and a professorial fellow at the Institute for Positive Psychology and Education, Australian Catholic University, Sydney.

== Education and academic career ==
He received his MSc (Dipl.-Psych.) in psychology from the Technical University of Braunschweig (1977), Germany, and his Ph.D. (Dr. phil.) from LMU Munich (1982). Pekrun was a professor at the University of Regensburg (1991–2001) and LMU Munich (2001–2012). He also served as Dean of the Faculty for Psychology and Education (Regensburg) and Vice-President for Research and Teacher Education at LMU Munich. He has taught as a guest professor at the University of Zurich, Switzerland; the University of Manitoba, Canada; and the University of Auckland, New Zealand, and served as president of the Stress and Anxiety Research Society.

== Work ==
Pekrun is conducting research on emotions, personality development, and educational assessment and evaluation. He has authored more than 350 publications and is listed among the top 1% of researchers in psychology and education. Pekrun originated the Control-Value Theory (CVT) which explains the individual and social origins of emotions, focusing on achievement emotions and the importance of personal beliefs for these emotions. The theory also explains how emotions impact human performance, how they can be regulated, and how intervention and professional practices can promote adaptive emotions and reduce maladaptive emotions such as test anxiety. Pekrun has developed the Achievement Emotions Questionnaire. He serves on the editorial boards of several journals (e.g., Educational Psychology Review; Educational Psychologist; Journal of Educational Psychology).

== Awards and fellowships ==
- Fellow, Society for Personality and Social Psychology, 2019
- Lifetime Achievement Award, German Psychological Society, 2018
- Sylvia Scribner Award, American Educational Research Association, 2017
- EARLI Oeuvre Award, European Association for Research on Learning and Instruction, 2017
- John G. Diefenbaker Award, Canada Council for the Arts, 2015
- Fellow, Association for Psychological Science, 2015
- Fellow, American Educational Research Association, 2012
- Fellow, International Academy of Education, 2008

== Selected works ==
- Pekrun, R., Marsh, H. W., Elliot, A. J., Stockinger, K., Perry, R. P., Vogl, E., Goetz, T., van Tilburg, W., Lüdtke, O., & Vispoel, W. (2023). A three-dimensional taxonomy of achievement emotions. Journal of Personality and Social Psychology 124(1), 145–178. https://doi.org/10.1037/pspp0000448
- Pekrun, R. (2021). Self-appraisals and emotions: A generalized control-value approach. In T. Dicke, F. Guay, H. W. Marsh, R. G. Craven, & D. M. McInerney (Eds). Self – a multidisciplinary concept (pp. 1–30). Information Age Publishing.
- Pekrun, R., & Linnenbrink-Garcia, L. (Eds.). (2014). International handbook of emotions in education. Francis & Taylor / Routledge. ISBN 9780415895026
- Pekrun, R. (2006). The control-value theory of achievement emotions: Assumptions, corollaries, and implications for educational research and practice. Educational Psychology Review, 18(4), 315–341. https://doi.org/10.1007/s10648-006-9029-9
- Pekrun, R., Goetz, T., Titz, W., & Perry, R. P. (2002). Academic emotions in students’ self-regulated learning and achievement: A program of qualitative and quantitative research. Educational Psychologist, 37(2), 91–105. https://doi.org/10.1207/S15326985EP3702_4
