= Shavelson =

Shavelson is a surname. Notable people with the surname include:

- Jared Shavelson, American drummer
- Melville Shavelson (1917–2007), American film director, producer, screenwriter, and author
- Richard Shavelson, American educational psychologist
