= Educational Psychologist (journal) =

- Discipline: Educational psychology
- Language: English
- Edited by: Jeffrey A. Greene and Lisa-Linnenbrink-Garcia

Publication details
- History: 1963-present
- Publisher: Routledge on behalf of Division 15 of the American Psychological Association
- Frequency: Quarterly
- Impact factor: 10.6 (2025)

Standard abbreviations
- ISO 4: Educ. Psychol.

Indexing
- CODEN: EDPSDT
- ISSN: 0046-1520 (print); 1532-6985 (web)
- LCCN: 75646351
- OCLC no.: 45007061

Links
- Journal homepage; Online access; Online archive

The Educational Psychologist is a quarterly peer-reviewed academic journal published by Routledge on behalf of Division 15 (Educational Psychology) of the American Psychological Association. It was established in 1963. The journal publishes conceptual, theoretical, and review articles (including meta-analyses), rather than empirical studies, on all aspects of educational psychology and learning in formal and informal educational environments.

It is considered one of the "big five" educational psychology journals (along with Cognition and Instruction, Educational Psychology Review, Journal of Educational Psychology, and Contemporary Educational Psychology). According to the Journal Citation Reports, the journal has a 2025 impact factor of 10.6.

The journal practices double-blind peer review (since at least 1979).

== Past editors ==
The following persons have been editors-in-chief:

- Ellis Batten Page, 1963-1966
- John F. Feldhusen, 1966-1969
- Richard E. Ripple, 1969-1972
- Frank H. Farley, 1972-1978
- Margaret M. Clifford, 1978
- Thomas J. Shuell, 1979-1984
- Richard E. Mayer,1985-1989
- Claire E. Weinstein, 1989-1992
- Gavriel Salomon, 1992-1995
- Paul Pintrich, 1995-2000
- Lyn Corno & Philip Winne, 2001-2006
- Gale M. Sinatra, 2005-2010
- Clark A. Chinn, 2010-2015
- Kathryn R. Wentzel, 2015-2020
- Jeffrey A. Greene & Lisa Linnenbrink-Garcia, 2020-present
