= Yapıcı =

Yapıcı (Turkish: "maker, builder") is a surname. Notable people with the surname include:

- Ebru Yapıcı (born 1976), Turkish photographer, actress, screenwriter and art director
- Nilay Yapici (born 1981), Turkish neuroscientist
- Serhat Yapıcı (born 1988), Turkish-German footballer
