= Parallel Play =

Parellel Play may refer to:

- Parallel play, a concept in developmental psychology
- Parallel Play (album), by Sloan, 2008
- Parallel Play (EP), by Panama Wedding, 2014
- Parallel Play (book), a 2009 memoir by Tim Page
- "Parallel Play" (Six Feet Under), a 2004 TV episode
