= Automated test scoring =

Automated test scoring may refer to:

- Automated essay scoring
- Optical mark recognition, commonly used to automate scoring of multiple-choice tests
