= Guido Makransky =

Guatemalan-Danish educational psychologist

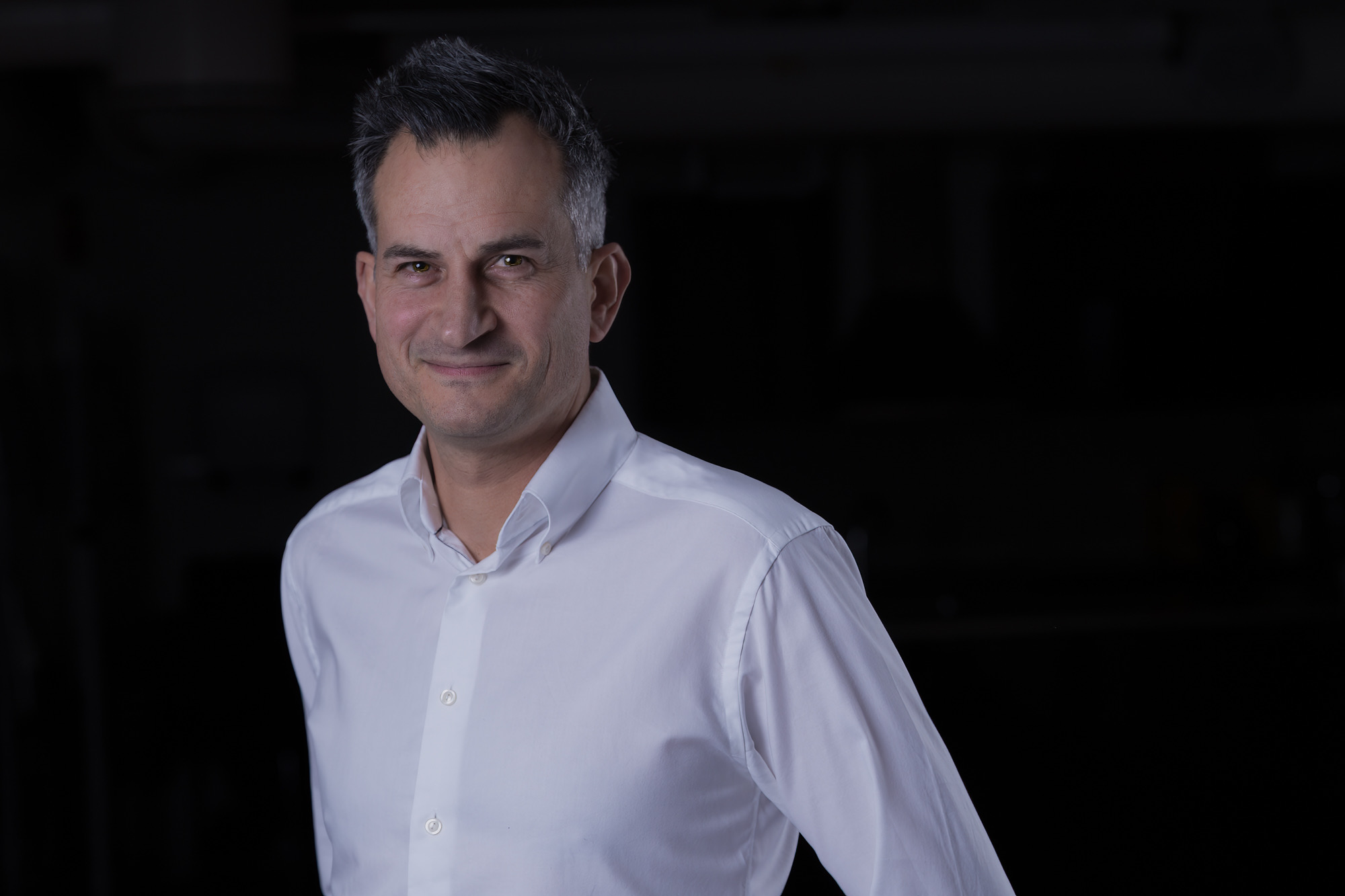
- Born: Chajaneb, Alta Verapaz, Guatemala
- Awards: Clarivate Highly Cited Researcher (2025)

Academic background
- Education: University of Georgia (BA); San Diego State University (MS); University of Twente (PhD)

Academic work
- Discipline: Educational psychology
- Institutions: University of Southern Denmark (2012–2018); University of Copenhagen (2018–present)
- Notable works: Cognitive Affective Model of Immersive Learning (CAMIL); Theory of Immersive Collaborative Learning (TICOL)

Guido Makransky is a professor of educational psychology at the Department of Psychology, University of Copenhagen. He heads the Virtual Learning Lab and the SCOPE (Social, Cultural, Organisational, Personality and Educational Psychology) section. He researches how virtual reality (VR), extended reality, and generative AI affect learning, collaboration, and behavior change. In 2025, he was named a Clarivate Highly Cited Researcher in the Cross-Field category.

== Early life and education ==
Makransky was born in Chajaneb, Alta Verapaz, Guatemala. He grew up speaking English, Spanish, and Qʼeqchiʼ.

Makransky earned a BA in Psychology from the University of Georgia (2000), an MS in Industrial/Organizational Psychology from San Diego State University (2004), and a Ph.D. in Psychology and Psychometrics from the University of Twente (2012).

He joined the University of Southern Denmark as an assistant professor in 2012, became associate professor in 2014, and founded the Virtual Learning Lab in 2016. In 2018, he moved to the University of Copenhagen as associate professor, where he was promoted to professor of educational psychology in 2022.

== Research ==
Makransky's research is centered on understanding the cognitive and affective processes involved in learning with emerging technologies. He integrates theories from educational psychology and related fields with empirical methods, combining controlled laboratory studies with field experiments in classrooms and organizations. His work has been influential in establishing theoretical frameworks for how people learn in technology-rich environments.

His early research focused on the effectiveness of virtual reality in education. A highly cited 2019 study published in Learning and Instruction demonstrated that while immersive VR increased students' sense of presence, it could also lead to higher cognitive load and lower learning outcomes compared to desktop simulations, challenging the assumption that immersion alone improves education.

His research has explored the use of VR to communicate the concept of herd immunity to decrease vaccine hesitancy, prudent antibiotic use, and investigate pro-environmental behavior and climate change communication. has worked to develop theoretical models that explain when and how VR is effective. In his research with Gustav B. Petersen, he proposed the Cognitive Affective Model of Immersive Learning in Educational Psychology Review (2021), which outlines the cognitive processes (such as interest and cognitive load) that mediate learning in immersive virtual reality. He described a theory in the same journal two years later to attempt to explain the mechanisms of collaborative learning in shared virtual spaces. Makransky's team introduced an AI tool designed to prompt generative sense-making in a 2025 study.

== Selected publications ==
- Makransky, G., Terkildsen, T. S., & Mayer, R. E. (2019). Adding immersive virtual reality to a science lab simulation causes more presence but less learning. Learning and Instruction, 60, 225–236.
- Makransky, G., & Petersen, G. B. (2021). The Cognitive Affective Model of Immersive Learning (CAMIL): A theoretical research-based model of learning in immersive virtual reality. Educational Psychology Review, 33, 937–958.
- Makransky, G., Andreasen, N. K., Baceviciute, S., & Mayer, R. E. (2021). Immersive virtual reality increases liking but not learning with a science simulation and generative learning strategies promote learning in immersive virtual reality. Journal of Educational Psychology, 113(4), 719–735.
- Petersen, G. B., Petkakis, G., & Makransky, G. (2022). A study of how immersion and interactivity drive VR learning. Computers & Education, 179, 104429.
- Makransky, G., & Mayer, R. E. (2022). Benefits of taking a virtual field trip in immersive virtual reality: Evidence for the immersion principle in multimedia learning. Educational Psychology Review, 34, 1771–1798.
- Makransky, G., & Petersen, G. B. (2023). The Theory of Immersive Collaborative Learning (TICOL). Educational Psychology Review, 35, 103.
- Petersen, G. B., Stenberd, V. A., Mayer, R. E., & Makransky, G. (2023). Collaborative generative learning activities in immersive virtual reality increase learning. Computers & Education, 207, 104931.
- Makransky, G., Shiwalia, B. M., Herlau, T., et al. (2025). Beyond the "Wow" Factor: Using generative AI for increasing generative sense-making. Educational Psychology Review, 37, 60.
