= Dale Schunk =

American psychologist

Dale Hansen Schunk is an educational psychologist, former Dean and current professor in the School of Education at the University of North Carolina at Greensboro. He has researched the effects of social and instructional variables on cognition, learning, self-regulation and motivation. Schunk has served on the editorial boards of journals such as Contemporary Educational Psychology and Educational Psychology Review, and has authored many journal articles and book chapters on educational psychology. In addition to other books, he is author of the widely used textbook, Learning Theories: An Educational Perspective, and coauthor of Motivation in Education: Theory Research and Applications.

== Education and career ==
Schunk received his undergraduate education at the University of Illinois, and he earned an M.Ed. degree from Boston University in 1974 and a Ph.D. from the Stanford Graduate School of Education in 1979. He was an assistant professor in educational psychology at the University of Houston from 1979 to 1986, and at the University of North Carolina at Chapel Hill from 1986 to 1993. He was a professor and head of the Department of Education Studies at Purdue University from 1993 to 2001, before moving to University of North Carolina at Greensboro in 2001 and served as the dean of the School of Education until 2010.

== Honors and awards ==
Schunk received the Albert J. Harris Research Award from the International Reading Association (1989), an Early Contributions Award from Division 15 (Educational Psychology) of the American Psychological Association (1982), and the Fulbright Distinguished American Scholar Award (1997).

== Selected recent publications ==
- Schunk, D. H. (2005). "Self-regulated learning: The educational legacy of Paul R. Pintrich". Educational Psychologist, 40, 85–94.
- Schunk, D. H. (2003). "Self-efficacy for reading and writing: Influence of modeling, goal setting, and self-evaluation". Reading and Writing Quarterly, 19, 159–172.
- Schunk, D. H. (2000). "Motivation for achievement: Past, present, and future". Issues in Education: Contributions from Educational Psychology, 6, 161–165.
- Schunk, D. H. (2000). "Coming to terms with motivation constructs". Contemporary Educational Psychology, 25 (116-119).
- Schunk, D. H., & Ertmer, P. A. (1999). "Self-regulatory processes during computer skill acquisition: Goal and self-evaluative influences". Educational Psychology, 91, 251–260.
- Schunk, D. H. (1999). "Social-self interaction and achievement behavior". Educational Psychologist, 34, 219–227.
- Schunk, D. H. (1998). "An educational psychologist's perspective on cognitive neuroscience". Educational Psychology Review, 10, 411–417.
- Schunk, D. H., & Zimmerman, B. J. (1997). "Social origins of self-regulatory competence". Educational Psychologist, 32, 195–208.
- Schunk, D. H., & Cutshall, D. (1997). "Motivation for lifelong learning". Kappa Delta Pi Record, 33, 124–128.
