= The Cultural Politics of Emotion =

2004 book by Sara Ahmed

- Author: Sara Ahmed
- Language: English
- Publisher: Routledge
- Publication date: August 20, 2004
- Pages: 224
- ISBN: 978-0-415-97255-0

The Cultural Politics of Emotion, published in 2004 by Edinburgh University Press and Routledge, is a book by Sara Ahmed focusing on the relationship between emotions, language, and bodies. Ahmed concentrates on the influence of emotions on the body and the ways in which bodies relate with communities, producing social relationships that determine the rhetoric of the nation. The book contributes to the growing conversation about emotion in rhetoric and cultural studies and employs a variety of theories including rhetorical theory, queer theory, feminist theory, Marxist theory, and poststructuralist theory of language.

== Summary of Ahmed's hypothesis ==
Ahmed argues emotions are cultural practices, as opposed to psychological states. Bodies are given value through emotion and thus the bodies, as well as the individuals, become aligned with a popular ideology. Cultural politics of emotions create "others" by aligning some bodies with each other inside a community and marginalizing other bodies. The repetition of words elicits an emotional response that only grows as repetition becomes more frequent. Words often generate meaning because of their history and context, but eventually, they can take on a new meaning. Emotions are material rhetoric—they have affective power and can dictate our modes of life. They are gateways into the social and material world. Emotions can lead to collective politics and social alliances; this social power is exhibited through politics and social movement, even to create national identities. To illustrate her points, Ahmed analyses public texts and the figurative language that they employ to name or perform emotion. Ahmed's theory encourages readers to consider the political implications of emotion.

== Contents ==
Ahmed's book comments on three political events and ideas: the reconciliation of Australian Aboriginal children to their families, the public's response to international terrorism, and asylum and immigration in the United Kingdom. She analyses texts surrounding these concepts to demonstrate how emotions are public and how the public is emotive.

The book consists of eight chapters, all of which are centered around the relationship between political beliefs, emotions and identity; it discusses the consequences of the interactions between these three factors. Each section discusses a different topic, which is as follows:

1. The Contingency of Pain: Discusses the way that pain is used in politics to demand action or shape identities
2. The Organisation of Hate: Discusses the role of hate in nation-building to separate self from others
3. The Affective Politics of Fear: Argues that responses to terrorism work as an economy of fear
4. The Performativity of Disgust: Emphasizes the way that the public views the "other" with disgust
5. Shame Before Others: Asserts that shame can form a collective ideal and work for nation-building
6. In the Name of Love: Discusses the way that multicultural love can help build a nation's identity
7. Queer Feelings: Considers the importance of emotions in queer theory
8. Feminist Attachments: Discusses the role of emotions in feminist theory

== Critical response and references ==
Ahmed's work has been referenced in many different texts since its creation in 2004, but below are just a few instances where Ahmed's ideas have been discussed.

Greg Noble, a professor at the University of Western Sydney, describes Ahmed's book as containing an analysis that has moved on from traditions in psychology and sociology in productive ways. She successfully covers a diverse range of emotions and sensations in a variety of contemporary topics. But most attractive to Noble is her development of an understanding of how emotions move—that is, how bodies and worlds materialize from emotion, particularly in the process of nation-building.

In an introduction to a collection of essays on the theoretical engagement with emotions and affectivity, Ahmed's theory is referred to as groundbreaking. They commend her ability to depict the relationship between bodies, language, and emotion while also analysing the intersections of gender, race, class, sexuality, and nation through a variety of histories.

In their book entitled Emotion in Education, Paul A. Schutz and Reinhard Pekrun apply Ahmed's theories of emotional politics to the classroom, emphasizing Ahmed's idea that emotions are not private but are socially organized. Additionally, they use Ahmed's idea of affective economics, which states that emotions can be used as an economy; they become attached to material objects that join some people together while separating others.

In another text about education and emotions, Michalinos Zembylas discusses the notion of emotional capital, pulling from Bourdieu's various ideas about capital. He works to pull together a contemporary discussion about the phrase emotional capital, especially in terms of education and uses Ahmed's ideas in this synthesis of discussion. He points out the growing emphasis on emotion, especially within cultural studies, but turns the focus of his article to education. Zembylas employs Ahmed's idea that emotions help form the boundaries and relationships between individuals and society, but emotions themselves don't reside in either space. Emotions help us connect with some people while distancing us from others and in material form can be used for political purposes, making them a form of capital. Zembylas concludes that evaluating this emotional capital can help us better understand some of the dynamics that take place in classrooms.
