= Tim Page (music critic) =

American journalist (born 1954)

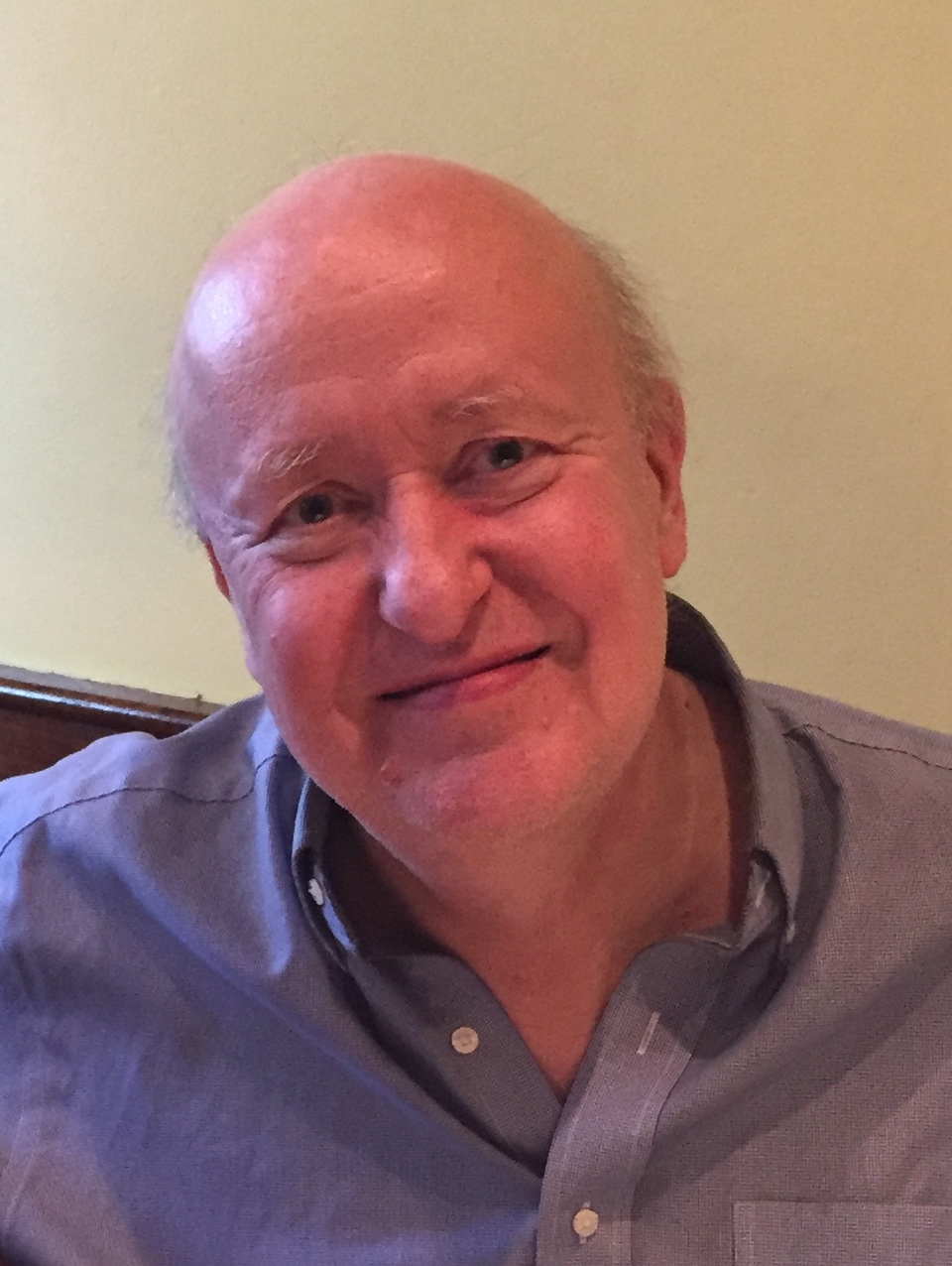
- Page in 2019
- Born: October 11, 1954 (age 71); San Diego, California, United States
- Education: The New School; Columbia University (BA)
- Occupations: Writer; editor; music critic; producer; radio host; professor
- Spouse: Vanessa Marie Weeks (m. 1984)
- Parent: Ellis Batten Page (father)
- Awards: Pulitzer Prize for Criticism (1997)

Tim Page (born Ellis Batten Page Jr.; 11 October 1954) is an American writer, music critic, editor, producer and professor who won the 1997 Pulitzer Prize for his music criticism for The Washington Post. Anthony Tommasini, the chief music critic for The New York Times, has praised Page's criticism for its "extensive knowledge of cultural history, especially literature; the instincts and news sense of a sharp beat reporter; the skills of a good storyteller; infectious inquisitiveness; immunity to dogma; and an always-running pomposity detector". Other notable writings by Page include his biography of the novelist Dawn Powell, which is credited for helping to spark the revival of Powell's work, and a memoir that chronicles growing up with undiagnosed autism spectrum disorder.

== Biography ==
=== Early life and education ===
Page was born in San Diego, California to Elizabeth Latimer Thaxton Page, a homemaker and former journalist, and Ellis Batten Page, a professor of educational psychology. Through his parents' record collection, Page developed an early fascination for music, particularly for the opera singers Enrico Caruso and Geraldine Farrar, and for "music that was nearly changeless, unfolding slowly and inevitably, with few surprises". During their time in San Diego, the family was acquainted with Alan M. Kriegsman, then the music critic for the San Diego Union, and his wife Sali Ann Kriegsman, who lived in Page's grandmother's house. Page credits "Mike" Kriegsman for having an early influence on his desire to write about music:

Almost every night Mike attended a concert, wrote it up, and we could read all about it in the morning paper. I could imagine no better way to live.

In 1962, Page's father accepted a full professorship at the University of Connecticut, where he would later help develop a system of grading essays by the computer known as Project Essay Grade (PEG) software. The Page family moved to Storrs, Connecticut; Page lived there until 1975, save a year-long stint from 1969 to 1970, when the family relocated to Caracas, Venezuela during Ellis Page's sabbatical.

From an early age, Page demonstrated an increasingly encyclopedic knowledge of music and an aptitude to catalogue significant historical names and dates. Page's father used him as his "laboratory of choice" in experiments with standardized testing, and eventually began taking Page to his classes to "perform as a burgeoning genius".

Page struggled in school even as his musical abilities matured and his interests in literature and film, especially silent film, deepened. He recruited his siblings and classmates in his early efforts in filmmaking; in 1967, Page and his films were the subject of a short documentary by David and Iris Hoffman. A Day With Timmy Page screened in the 1968 New York Film Festival and as the opening selection of the first Festival of Young Filmmakers in New York. More recently, in 2019 the Echo Park Film Center in Los Angeles, California screened A Day With Timmy Page along with two of Page's early films.

"Prodigies have a tough time of things", Page wrote in his memoir. His own experiences as a child genius, and the extreme praise and ostracism that came with it, influenced his later skepticism for solo careers for child artists and what he has described as "the cult of the prodigy":

It is deeply exploitative and often ruinous to young artists, and it transforms age … into a liability for more seasoned players.

Despite that, Page was also an early champion of Midori Gotō; he first praised her playing when she was 14 years old and later profiled her when she was 21.

Page struggled with depression and anxiety throughout his later teen years:

My depression arrived like a Midwestern summer thunderstorm — clouds moving in slowly, balletically, in strange air and mustard light. Everything I read, watched and listened to was unrelievedly gloomy, and this was having its effect.

On 20 May 1972, Page was a passenger in a vehicle accident that killed two close friends. He does not drive to this day and attributes his reluctance to do so in part to this accident. Shortly after, Page attended an introductory class in Transcendental Meditation, beginning a lifelong habit of meditation.

In 1975, Page returned to the Tanglewood Institute, where he had spent previous summers. There, Page met the musician, teacher, writer and arts administrator Leonard Altman, whom Page credits as his "most significant mentor". Under Altman's guidance, Page moved to New York City in 1975 to enroll at the Mannes School of Music at The New School. Page attended Mannes for two years, where he studied music composition with Charles Jones. He quickly "decided that [he] was more interested in writing prose than in writing music" and transferred to Columbia University. Page dates his first mature piece of criticism to April 1976, when he was moved to write an essay about the world premiere of Steve Reich's "Music for 18 Musicians".

=== Career ===
Several weeks after graduating from Columbia, Page sent an unsolicited article about the 1979 release of the complete works of Anton Webern conducted by Pierre Boulez to the SoHo Weekly News. The paper accepted, published, and paid for the article. "And suddenly", Page writes in his memoir, "I was a music critic."

Over the next several years, Page continued writing for the SoHo Weekly News and other publications while hosting a contemporary music program on the Columbia radio station WKCR. In 1981, he began an 11-year association with WNYC-FM, where he presented an afternoon program that broadcast interviews with composers and musicians, including guests like Aaron Copland, Virgil Thomson, Philip Glass, Steve Reich, Dizzy Gillespie and Meredith Monk.

Page has become one of the leading writers on the work of the idiosyncratic Canadian pianist Glenn Gould. Page spoke over the phone with Gould for the first time in October 1980; what was supposed to be a brief interview lasted for nearly four hours. Over the next two years, Page and Gould spoke on the phone several times a week. They met only once during a three-day visit Page paid to Gould in Toronto, where the two conducted a one-hour radio drama comparing Gould's two versions of J.S. Bach's Goldberg Variations. This interview was released on the three-CD set A State of Wonder: The Complete Goldberg Variations 1955 & 1981 in 2002. Page edited the first collection of Gould's writings, The Glenn Gould Reader, in 1984, which has never gone out of print.

Page was a music writer and culture reporter at The New York Times from 1982 to 1987; in 1987, he became the chief music critic of Newsday. He was the chief classical music critic of The Washington Post 1995–2008, and in 1997 he was awarded the Pulitzer Prize for Criticism for what the Pulitzer board called his "lucid and illuminating music criticism;" the preceding year he had written on subjects that included the decline of classical music recordings and the position of the violin section in the orchestra.

Page has also written widely on film and literature for the Post and elsewhere. In 1991, Page became fascinated by the work of the then-obscure novelist Dawn Powell. He wrote Dawn Powell: A Biography, published in 1998; he also edited and annotated the Library of America's two-volume collection of Powell's work, which was published in 2001. He has helped launch revivals of the writings of Sigrid Undset and Robert Green Ingersoll, and he wrote an appreciation of the late singer-songwriter Judee Sill, whom Page considers to be "an artist of extraordinary gifts." Other writings have praised the musical contributions of The Magnetic Fields and The High Llamas. Page has resisted differentiating between the musical merits of classical music and other genres, writing that:

...it had been my hope to infuse some of the passion, allusiveness and occasional irreverence I found in the best writing about jazz and rock back into the realm of classical music. Everything has always reminded me of everything else, anyway.

In 1993, Page served as the first executive producer for the short-lived record label BMG Catalyst. His projects included Spiked, an album of music by Spike Jones with liner notes by Thomas Pynchon; Memento Bittersweet, an album of music by Chris DeBlasio, Kevin Oldham, Lee Gannon and other HIV-positive composers; Night of the Mayas, the first American album devoted entirely to orchestral works by the Mexican composer Silvestre Revueltas; two solo recital discs by violinist Maria Bachmann and several others. Page has also produced concerts at venues ranging from Carnegie Hall to New York's Mudd Club. From 1999 to 2000, he served as the artistic advisor and creative chair for the St. Louis Symphony Orchestra.

In November 2007, Page replied to an unsolicited press release about former Washington mayor Marion Barry's views concerning a hospital. The e-mail read: "Must we hear about it every time this crack addict attempts to rehabilitate himself with some new – and typically half-witted – political grandstanding? ... I cannot think of anything the useless Marion Barry could do that would interest me in the slightest, up to and including overdose." Page apologized and called it the stupidest thing he'd done in journalism. He has continued to write regularly for the Post without respite.

In 2007, the University of Southern California named Page a professor of journalism and music. He taught at USC until 2019; while there, he helped launch the USC Annenberg School for Communication and Journalism's master's degree program in specialized journalism. Page has been a member of the Rubin Institute for Music Criticism since its founding in 2012, and in 2015, he was appointed "Visiting Scholar in Residence" at Oberlin College.

In 2020, Page retired from USC and moved back to New York City. Later that year, he embarked on a six-month tour of the Balkan countries. In May 2021, the Peabody Conservatory announced that Page is to be a visiting professor as of the autumn of 2021.

=== Autism spectrum disorder ===
Page revealed in a 2007 essay for The New Yorker that seven years earlier he had been diagnosed with Asperger's syndrome, "in the course of a protracted effort to identify — and, if possible, alleviate — my lifelong unease." The essay led to the publication of his book-length memoir Parallel Play, published by Doubleday in September 2009. In a review for The New York Times, Janet Maslin wrote that the book is "not about Asperger's, but it is intensified by the peculiar nature of Mr. Page's Asperger-governed perceptions. Tirelessly logical, sometimes agonizingly so, he lives life in an extra dimension, with a sense of time that irrevocably links past and present, living and dead, ardent love affairs and broken ones." Page has written that he "wouldn't wish the condition on anybody — I've spent too much of my life isolated, unhappy, and conflicted — yet I am also convinced that many of the things I've done were accomplished not despite my Asperger's syndrome but because of it."

=== Traumatic brain injury and recovery ===
In 2015, Page collapsed at a train station in New London, Connecticut, having had an acute subdural hematoma, or a clot of blood that puts pressure on the brain. Disabled at first, he took medical leave from USC for the better part of a year. Gradually he recovered, a process that he attributes to listening deeply to music that had comforted him throughout his life. He has written that despite his injury he has "enjoyed some of the best years of my life – pacing myself carefully, seeing people when I can, teaching once more and even writing a bit".

== Selected bibliography ==
- The Hip Pocket Guide to New York (Harper and Row, 1982). Editor.
- The Glenn Gould Reader (Alfred A. Knopf, 1984). Editor.
- Selected Letters of Virgil Thomson, with Vanessa Weeks Page (Summit Books, 1988). Editor.
- William Kapell: An Illustrated Life History of the American Pianist (International Piano Archives at Maryland, 1992). Author.
- Music From The Road: Views and Reviews 1978–1992 (Oxford University Press, 1992). Anthology of previously published work.
- Dawn Powell at Her Best (Steerforth Press, 1994). Editor.
- The Diaries of Dawn Powell: 1931–1965 (Steerforth Press, 1995). Discovered, edited and annotated Powell's diaries.
- Dawn Powell: A Biography (Henry Holt, 1998). Author.
- Selected Letters of Dawn Powell (Henry Holt, 1999). Editor.
- Dawn Powell: Novels 1930–1942 and Dawn Powell: Novels 1944–1962 (Library of America, 2001). Editor.
- The Unknown Sigrid Undset (Steerforth, 2001). Editor.
- Glenn Gould: A Life In Pictures (Random House, 2002). Author.
- Tim Page on Music (Amadeus Press, 2002). Collection of previously published work.
- "What's God Got to Do With It?": Robert Ingersoll on Free Thought, Honest Talk and the Separation of Church and State (Steerforth Press, 2005). Editor.
- Parallel Play: Growing Up With Undiagnosed Asperger's (Doubleday, 2009; reissued in 2010 with changes)
- Carnegie Hall Treasures (HarperCollins, 2011)
- Virgil Thomson: Music Chronicles (Library of America, 2014). Editor.
