= Mirror symbol hypothesis =

Theory in the philosophy of artificial intelligence

The mirror symbol hypothesis is a mechanistic explanation of theory of mind proposed as a means of constructing empathetic artificial intelligence. It was first proposed by proposed by Michael Timothy Bennett and Yoshihiro Maruyama.

== Description ==
The following summarizes the description given in "Philosophical Specification of Empathetic Ethical Artificial Intelligence", published in IEEE Transactions on Cognitive and Developmental Systems in 2022:

A mirror neuron is a neuron that discharges both in the execution of a specific motor act (such as grasping), and in the passive observation of that act. Likewise, neurons may discharge both in the experience of an emotion, and in the observation of another experiencing that emotion. Hence this mirror action of neurons may facilitate empathy.

The mirror symbol hypothesis posits that symbols emerge (initially formalised in terms of Lawrence W. Barsalou's perceptual symbols, and later as statements in an implementable language) may function in a similar way to facilitate empathy. There exist symbols (e.g. for grasping) that apply both in the act and in the passive observation thereof. In the Semiotic theory of Charles Sanders Peirce, symbols are made of three parts; a sign (for example the word "grasp"), a referent (the act or observation thereof) and the interpretent (that links the two, determining the effect upon one who perceives the symbol). The mirror symbol hypothesis holds that the same interpretant can be used in both action and passive observation and, if reward signals or qualia are functions of interpretants (being what determines the effect upon one who perceives), facilitate empathy. This requires a means of constructing other-directed intentionality (a means of telling one's intent apart from others), so that one does not confuse one's own experience with the observation of another's.

== Applications ==
Later more formal descriptions integrated the mirror symbol hypothesis into a mathematical formalism (see artificial general intelligence § Characteristics) to provide a mechanistic explanation of empathy. The requirement for other-directed intentionality is addressed via the emergence of symbols representing causal interventions (behaving as a "do" operator - see Causal model).
