= Nilay Yapici =

Turkish neuroscientist (born 1981)

- Born: 1981 (age 44–45); Samsun, Turkey
- Education: Bogazici University, Institute of Molecular Pathology at the University of Vienna
- Known for: Discovery of Sex Peptide Receptor and Ingestion Neurons in fruit flies
- Scientific career
- Fields: Neuroscience
- Workplaces: Cornell University

Nilay Yapici (born 1981) is a Turkish neuroscientist at Cornell University in Ithaca, New York, where she is the Nancy and Peter Meinig Family Investigator in the Life Sciences and Adelson Sesquicentennial Fellow in the Department of Neurobiology and Behavior. Yapici studies the neural circuits underlying decision making and feeding behavior in fruit fly models.

== Early life and education ==
Yapici was born in Samsun, Turkey in 1981. She attended Bogazici University, in Istanbul, Turkey studying molecular biology and genetics. In 2002, Yapici was a summer Visiting Student in the lab of Mark Gluck at Rutgers University in New Jersey where she studied the cognitive neuroscience of learning and memory. The following summer, she conducted research in Switzerland at the Zurich University Hospital Department of Pathology in the lab of Adriano Aguzzi studying prion diseases. Back at Bogazici University in 2003, Yapici began working in the lab of Kuyas Bugra, where she completed her honors thesis exploring signalling mechanisms in retinal tissue.

After graduating with her B.Sc. in 2004, Yapici pursued her graduate training in Molecular Biology within the Institute of Molecular Pathology at the University of Vienna, Austria. Yapici was mentored by Barry Dickson during her PhD, where she explored the genetic basis of complex innate behavior in Drosophila. During this time, Yapici helped to discover the receptor for sex peptide.

In 2009, Yapici completed her graduate training and then moved to America to conduct her postdoctoral studies in the lab of Leslie Vosshall at the Rockefeller University in New York City. Her research in the Vosshall lab continued to use Drosophila as a model organism, however she began to explore the neural circuits governing feeding behavior. Yapici developed a method in the lab to measure Drosophila food intake with high resolution. She completed her postdoctoral work in 2016 before starting her own lab at Cornell University.

=== Discovery of sex peptide receptor in Drosophila ===
During graduate school, Yapici was a member of the group that was the first to characterize the Drosophila sex peptide receptor (SPR), a G-coupled protein receptor expressed in the brain and ventral nerve chord as well as the female reproductive tract. They found through knockout studies that SRP is critical to the post-mating behavioral change, and without SPR, post-mated females continue to express behavioral phenotypes of virgins. They also identified TBh, important in octopamine synthesis, and VMAT, important in octopamine transport. They found that knockdown of these genes lead to similar behavioral phenotypes as flies lacking SRP.

Since SPR is also expressed in the cells of organisms who do not have exposure to SP as Drosophila do, the group explored alternative ligands for SPR and found myoinhibitory peptides (MIPs) to be another type of SPR ligand and they appeared to be conserved across a spectrum of invertebrates. Interestingly, MIPs are not derived from male sex organs as SP is, and MIPs are not necessary to promote the switch in behavior post-mating in females, while SP is necessary.

Following this work, the group decided to patent the idea of targeting the SPR as a method of insect control. They proposed administration of an analogue of SP to females which will bind to SPR and cause the shift in behavior from that of a virgin to that of a post-mated female without the need for copulation. This could prevent copulation, and thus also egg-laying and blood-sucking in insects like mosquitoes who only suck blood after laying eggs.

== Career and research ==
During her postdoctoral work in the Vosshall Lab, Yapici began to explore feeding behavior in Drosophila. She created "Expresso", an automated tool to study temporal dynamics of food ingestion using multiple single-fly feeding chambers, each with a sensor to detect liquid food levels. She was able to detect temporally precise ingestion, related to hunger state, and identify 12 cholinergic local interneurons that she called Ingestion Neurons (IN1) necessary for this behavior. Since these neurons receive pre-synaptic inputs from pharyngeal neurons, she hypothesized that IN1 neurons detect and monitor ingestion such that after subsequent feeding bouts, the activity of these neurons proportionally decreased, as an indicator of feeding or hunger state, and found that stimulation increased the level of consumption in flies.

In 2016, Yapici became the Nancy and Peter Meinig Family Investigator in the Life Sciences and Adelson Sesquicentennial Fellow in Cornell's Department of Neurobiology and Behavior. Her lab uses hunger and feeding to examine how environmental cues prompt decision making and drive motivation signals to eat or not to eat in Drosophila.

At Cornell, she is one of the four members of the new National Science Foundation funded NeuroNex Hub., developing methods to image the brain in less time, greater depth, and at greater volumes. They were able to maintain functional and structural integrity of the fly brain while imaging with two and three photon resolution to observe calcium signals in mushroom body Kenyon cells in response to odors.

=== Feeding behavior in Drosophila ===
After starting her lab at Cornell, Yapici started to examine the expression of various Ligand-gated ion channel ionotropic receptors involved in taste function in flies.—another large component is mediated by trhese. They found a receptor that mediated perception of carbonation and drove both physiological and behavioral responses and showed it was necessary for sugar-sensing through gustatory receptors They also found that IR56d, a type of ionotropic receptor implicated in gustation, was essential for physiological responses to carbonation and fatty acids but not sugars. Further, through IR56d, carbonation is a behavioral attractant for flies.

== Awards and honors ==
- 2019 National Institutes of Health's Institute of General Medical Sciences Grant
- 2018 Glenn Foundation for Medical Research and American Federation for Aging Research Grants for Early Career Investigators
- 2017 NSF NeuroNex Neurotechnology Hub Awards
- 2017 Pew Biomedical Scholar
- 2017 Alfred P. Sloan Foundation
- 2009 EMBO Long Term Fellowship
- 2009 Human Frontiers (HFSP) Long Term Fellowship
- Lindau Nobel Laureate Meeting (Selected Participant)

== Select publications ==
- Sanchez-Alcaniz JA, Silbering AF, Croset V, Zappia G, Sivasubramaniam AK, Abuin L, Sahai SY, Münch D, Steck K, Auer TO, Cruchet S, Neagu-Maier L, Sprecher SG, Ribeiro C, Yapici N, Benton R (2018). An expression atlas of variant ionotropic glutamate receptors identifies a molecular basis of carbonation sensing. Nature communications, 9(1), 4252.
- Yapici, N., Cohn, R., Schusterreiter, C., Ruta, V., & Vosshall, L. B. (2016). A taste circuit that regulates ingestion by integrating food and hunger signals. Cell, 165(3), 715–729.
- Yapici, N., Zimmer, M., & Domingos, A. I. (2014). Cellular and molecular basis of decision‐making. EMBO Reports, 15, 1023–1035.
- Bussell, J. J., Yapici, N., Zhang, S. X., Dickson, B. J., & Vosshall, L. B. (2014). Abdominal-B neurons control Drosophila virgin female receptivity. Current Biology, 24, 1584–1595.
- Kim, Y. J., Bartalska, K., Audsley, N., Yamanaka, N., Yapici, N., Lee, J. Y. & Dickson, B. J. (2010). MIPs are ancestral ligands for the sex peptide receptor. Proceedings of the National Academy of Sciences U.S.A., 107, 6520–6525.
- Häsemeyer, M., Yapici, N., Heberlein, U., & Dickson, B. J. (2009). Sensory neurons in the Drosophila genital tract regulate female reproductive behavior. Neuron, 61, 511–518.
- Yapici, N., Kim, Y. J., Ribeiro, C., & Dickson, B. J. (2007). A receptor that mediates the post-mating switch in Drosophila reproductive behavior. Nature, 451, 33–37.
