= Phenomenography =

Research method involving experiences

Phenomenography is a qualitative research methodology, within the interpretivist paradigm, that investigates the qualitatively different ways in which people experience something or think about something. It is an approach to educational research which appeared in publications in the early 1980s. It initially emerged from an empirical rather than a theoretical or philosophical basis.

While being an established methodological approach in education for several decades, phenomenography has now been applied rather extensively in a range of diverse disciplines such as environmental management, computer programming, workplace competence, and internationalization practices.

== Overview ==
Phenomenography's ontological assumptions are subjectivist: the world exists and different people construct it in different ways and from a non-dualist viewpoint (viz., there is only one world, one that is ours, and one that people experience in many different ways). Phenomenography's research object has the character of knowledge; therefore its ontological assumptions are also epistemological assumptions.

Its emphasis is on description. Its data collection methods typically include semi-structured interviews with a small, purposive sample of subjects, with the researcher "working toward an articulation of the interviewee’s reflections on experience that is as complete as possible". Description is important because our knowledge of the world is a matter of meaning and of the qualitative similarities and differences in meaning as it is experienced by different people.

A phenomenographic data analysis sorts qualitatively distinct perceptions which emerge from the data collected into specific "categories of description." The set of these categories is sometimes referred to as an "outcome space." These categories (and the underlying structure) become the phenomenographic essence of the phenomenon. They are the primary outcomes and are the most important result of phenomenographic research. Phenomenographic categories are logically related to one another, typically by way of hierarchically inclusive relationships, although linear and branched relationships can also occur. The differences between categories of description are known as the "dimensions of variation."

The process of phenomenographic analysis is strongly iterative and comparative. It involves continual sorting and resorting of data and ongoing comparisons between the data and the developing categories of description, as well as between the categories themselves.

A phenomenographic analysis seeks a "description, analysis, and understanding of . . . experiences". The focus is on variation: variation in both the perceptions of the phenomenon, as experienced by the actor, and in the "ways of seeing something" as experienced and described by the researcher. This is described as phenomenography's "theory of variation." Phenomenography allows researchers to use their own experiences as data for phenomenographic analysis; it aims for a collective analysis of individual experiences.

== Emphasis on description ==
Phenomenographic studies usually involve contextual groups of people and data collection involves individual description of understanding, often through interview. Analysis is whole group orientated since all data is analysed together with the aim of identifying possible conceptions of experience related to the phenomenon under investigation, rather than individual experiences. There is emphasis on detailed analysis of description which follows from an assumption that conceptions are formed from both the results of human action and from the conditions for it. Clarification of understanding and experience depends upon the meaning of the conceptions themselves. The object of phenomenographic study is not the phenomenon per se but the relationship between the actors and the phenomenon.

== Distinguished from phenomenology ==
Phenomenography is not phenomenology. Phenomenographers adopt an empirical orientation and they investigate the experiences of others. The focus of interpretive phenomenology is upon the essence of the phenomenon, whereas the focus of phenomenography is upon the essence of the experiences and the subsequent perceptions of the phenomenon.

== See also ==
- Ference Marton
- Antipositivism
