= Out-of-school learning =

Educational concept

Out-of-school learning is an educational concept first proposed by Lauren Resnick in her 1987 AERA presidential address, which consists of curricular and non-curricular learning experiences for pupils and students outside the school environment.

== Goals ==
The point of out-of-school learning is to overcome learning disabilities, development of talents, strengthen communities and increase interest in education by creating extra learning opportunities in the real world. In a study performed by the UCLA National Center for Research on Evaluation, Standards, and Student Testing (CRESST) it was proven that out-of-school learning increases the interest in education and school itself.

== Implementation ==
Out-of-school learning is typically not coordinated by the school itself. Out-of-school experiences are organized with community partners such as museums, sport facilities, charity initiatives, and more. Out-of-school experiences can range from service learning to summer school and expeditions or more commonly occur in day-to-day experiences at after-school with creative ventures such as arts courses and even sports. Some other examples of out-of-school learning are:

- homework and homework clubs
- study clubs – extending curriculum
- mentoring – by other pupils and by adults, including parents
- learning about learning
- community service and citizenship
- residential activities – study weeks or weekends

== Results ==
Research by the Wallace Foundation has found that out-of-school learning can be a great opportunity to discover and develop talents. Especially if a professional organisation develops a learning environment that guides groups of pupils/students in their co-operation in creating a professional and publicly visible product, presentation or performance. Companies, cultural institutions and non-governmental organisations can offer valuable out-of-school learning experiences.

Organisations will see results according to the quality of the experience, whether they aim to promote active and healthy lifestyles, increase community involvement and visitors/members, or an interest in a company's corporate responsibility projects and employment opportunities.

== Projects ==
In the United Kingdom alone, several local and state bodies run out-of-school learning projects, with additional funding from the National Lottery (£9.1m in 2000). Some major examples of out-of-school learning projects are:

- Parentzone, an out of school learning initiative from the Scottish government
- LA's Best, an out of school learning initiative from Tom Bradley mayor of Los Angeles, California from 1973 to 1993
- Sarahs'wereld and De Wenswijk, out of school learning initiatives from the Wensenwerk Foundation sponsored by the Ministry of Housing, Spatial Planning and the Environment in the Netherlands.

== See also ==
- Constructivism
- Cooperative education
