= Gifted Education Resource Institute, Purdue University =

The Gifted Education Research Resource Institute (GERI) was founded by John F. Feldhusen in 1977 and is situated in the College of Education, Purdue University in West Lafayette, Indiana. GERI runs enrichment programs for talented youth, graduate programs for future scholars and leaders, professional development and coursework for educators, and ongoing research on the psychology of giftedness, creativity, and talent development. GERI faculty and staff work with P-12 educators in developing and improving services for gifted, creative, and talented children, as well as training school teachers and administrators in gifted education. In addition, GERI has developed several programs for talented youth. The Super Saturday program, a six-week enrichment program, was created in the spring of 1976. In 1977, GERI began Summer Residential Camps, aimed at providing a preview of college life to talented students.

== Talent development programs ==
=== Summer residential camps ===
GERI offers three programs each summer.

- Comet, 1 week sessions: For students who have completed grade 5–6.
- Star, 2 week sessions: For students who have completed grades 7–8.
- Pulsar, 2 week sessions: For students who have completed grades 9–12.

=== Super Summer and Super Saturday programs ===
The Super Summer and Super Saturday programs are two enrichment programs designed to meet the needs of academically, creatively, and artistically gifted students from Pre-Kindergarten (age 4) through grade 8. The courses include science, technology, engineering, mathematics, visual and performing arts, as well as original interdisciplinary studies. Super Saturday is offered both fall and spring semesters for six Saturdays, and Super Summer is offered week days during the summer for two, one-week sessions.

== Graduate programs ==
=== Ph.D. and master's ===
Funding may be available to support exceptional students pursuing full-time Ph.D. study.

=== Licensure ===
The accredited licensure program is available online and on campus for teachers interested in adding a high-ability license to their Indiana teaching credentials or as a certificate in gifted, creative, and talented studies for educators in other states and countries.

== Research ==
Some examples include:

- Total School Cluster Grouping Model
- Purdue Three-Stage Model
- Theory of Personal Talent
- Developing talent in the STEM disciplines
- Applying gifted education know-how to improve general education
- Understanding social and affective needs
- Investigating students’ perceptions of their learning experiences
- Studying twice-exceptional learners
- Recognizing and developing talent among underserved populations and in non-traditional areas

== Professional development ==
Faculty and staff conduct professional development related to their research using online, on-site, and campus-based delivery methods.
