= Monique Boekaerts =

Belgian educationalist and university teacher

Monique Boekaerts (born 1946) is a Belgian educationalist. She was a professor of pedagogy at the Radboud University Nijmegen (1980–1990) and Leiden University (1991–2011).

== Career ==
Boekaerts was born in 1946 in Belgium. She studied psychology at the University of Reading in the United Kingdom, obtaining a degree in 1974. She obtained her PhD at Tilburg University in 1978, with a thesis titled: "Towards a theory of learning based on individual differences".

She was a professor of educational psychology and interdisciplinary education at the Radboud University Nijmegen from 1980 to 1990. From 1991 until her retirement in 2011 she held the chair of cognitive and instructional psychology at the university of Leiden University.

In 1985 Boekaerts was one of the founders of the European Association for Research on Learning and Instruction. She served as president of the organisation between 1991 and 2001. In 2015 she won its EARLI Oeuvre Award.

Boekaerts was elected a member of the Royal Netherlands Academy of Arts and Sciences in 2009.
