= Lera Boroditsky =

American cognitive scientist

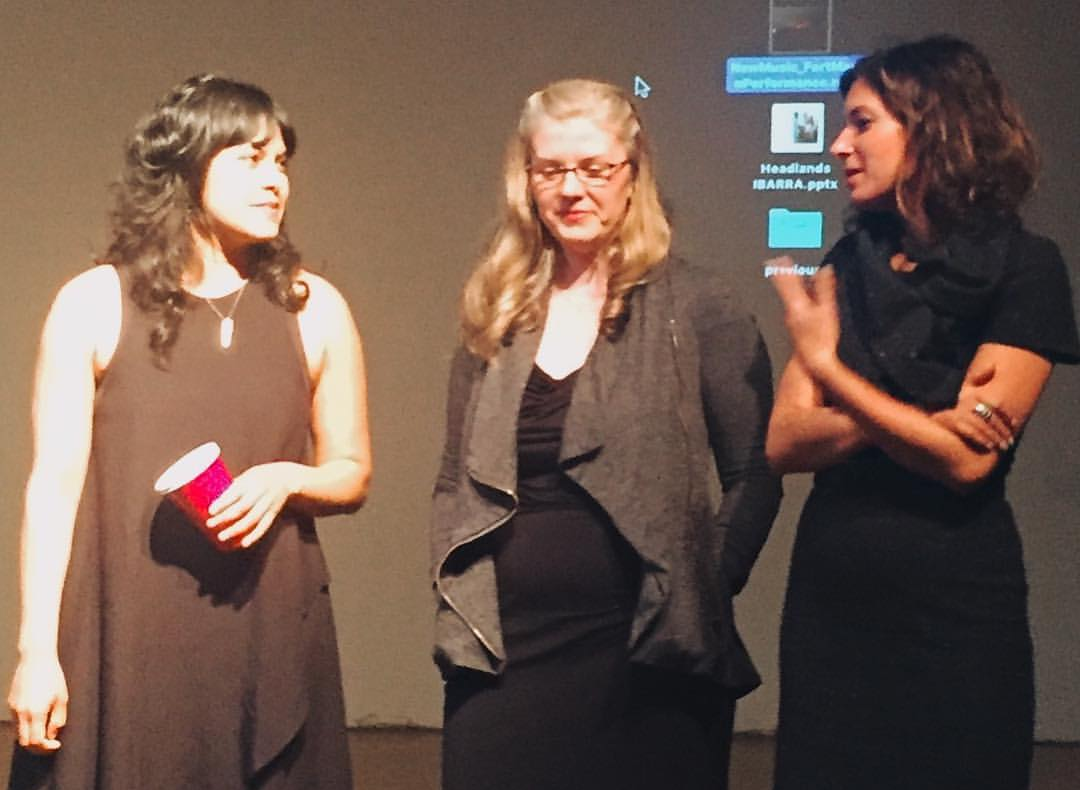
- Left to right: Performance artist Xandra Ibarra, cultural anthropologist Adrian Van Allen, Dr. Boroditsky in 2017
- Born: 1976 or 1977 (age 49–50); Belarus
- Education: Northwestern University (BA, 1996), Stanford University (PhD, 2001)
- Scientific career
- Doctoral advisor: Gordon H. Bower

Dr. Lera Boroditsky (born 1976 or 1977) is a cognitive scientist and professor in the fields of language and cognition. She is one of the main contributors to the theory of linguistic relativity. She is a Searle Scholar, a McDonnell Scholar, recipient of a National Science Foundation Career award, and an American Psychological Association Distinguished Scientist. She is Professor of Cognitive Science at the University of California, San Diego. She previously served on the faculty at Massachusetts Institute of Technology and at Stanford University.

== Early life and education ==
Boroditsky was born in 1976 or 1977 in Belarus to a Jewish family. When she was 12 years old, her family immigrated to the United States, where she learned to speak English as her fourth language. As a teenager she began thinking about the degree to which language differences could shape an argument and exaggerate the differences between people. She received her B.A. degree in cognitive science at Northwestern University in 1996. She went to graduate school at Stanford University, where she obtained her Ph.D. in cognitive psychology in 2001. She worked under Gordon Bower who was her thesis advisor at Stanford. Boroditsky also conducted research at Stanford University.

== Career ==
She became an assistant professor in the department of brain and cognitive sciences at MIT before she was hired by Stanford in 2004. Gordon Bower says: "It's exceedingly rare for us to hire back our own graduate students. She brought a very high IQ and a tremendous ability for penetrating analysis." At Stanford, she was an assistant professor of psychology, philosophy, and linguistics.

Boroditsky is professor of cognitive science at the University of California, San Diego (UCSD). She studies language and cognition, focusing on interactions between language, cognition, and perception. Her research combines insights and methods from linguistics, psychology, neuroscience, and anthropology.

Her work has provided new insights into the controversial question of whether the languages we speak shape the way we think (Linguistic relativity). She uses powerful examples of cross-linguistic differences in thought and perception that stem from syntactic or lexical differences between languages. Her papers and lectures have influenced the fields of psychology, philosophy, and linguistics in providing evidence and research against the notion that human cognition is largely universal and independent of language and culture.

She was named a Searle Scholar and has received several awards for her research, including an NSF CAREER award, the Marr Prize from the Cognitive Science Society, and the McDonnell Scholar Award.

In addition, Boroditsky gives popular science lectures to the general public, and her work has been covered in news and media outlets. Boroditsky talks about how all the languages differ from one another, whether in grammatical differences or contain different sounds, vocabulary, or patterns. Boroditsky studies how the languages we speak shape the way we think.

== Research ==
Boroditsky is known for her research relating to cognitive science, how language affects the way we think, and other linguistic related topics. One of her main research topics focuses on how people with different linguistic backgrounds act or have different behaviors when exposed to certain events. On the individual level, Boroditsky is interested in how the languages we speak influence and shape the way we think.

She has done studies comparing English speakers to other native speakers of a different language and seeing the differences in the way they think and act given a certain scenario. For example, English and Russian differentiate between cups and glasses. In Russian, the difference between a cup and a glass is based on its shape instead of its material as in English.

Another example of her work is how she highlighted the difference in the organization of time and space from English to Mandarin. In her article "Does language shape thought? Mandarin and English speakers' conceptions of time" Boroditsky has argued for a weak version of linguistic relativity, providing a ground for it through her cross-language studies on verb tenses carried out with English and Mandarin speakers. She argues that English speakers conceive time in a way that is analogous to their conception of spatial horizontal movement, whereas native Mandarin speakers associate it with vertical movement. She has also stated that these differences do not totally determine conceptualization, since it is possible for the speakers of a language to be taught to think like the speakers of other languages, without needing to learn any such language. Therefore, and according to Boroditsky, mother tongues may have an effect on cognition, but it is not determining.

A study published in 2000, observed that "the processing of the concrete domain of space could modulate the processing of the abstract domain of time, but not the other way around." The frequent use of a mental metaphor connects it to the abstract concept and helps the mind to store non-concrete informations in the long-term memory. Boroditsky has also done research on metaphors and their relation to crime. Her work has suggested that some conventional and systematic metaphors influence the way people reason about the issues they describe. For instance, previous work has found that people were more likely to want to fight back against a crime "beast" by increasing the police force but more likely to want to diagnose and treat a crime "virus" through social reform.

== Publications (partial list) ==
- Thibodeau PH, Boroditsky L (2015) Measuring Effects of Metaphor in a Dynamic Opinion Landscape. PLoS ONE 10(7): e0133939. doi: 10.1371/journal.pone.0133939
- Thibodeau PH, Boroditsky L (2013) Natural Language Metaphors Covertly Influence Reasoning. PLoS ONE 8(1): e52961. doi: 10.1371/journal.pone.0052961
- Boroditsky, L. (2003), "Linguistic relativity", in Nadel, L. (ed.), Encyclopedia of cognitive science, London: Macmillan, pp. 917–922
- Boroditsky, L.; Schmidt, L.; Phillips, W. (2003), "Sex, syntax, and semantics", in Gentner, D.; Goldin-Meadow, S. (eds.), Language in mind: Advances in the study of language and thought, Cambridge, MA: MIT Press, pp. 61–80
- Boroditsky, L. & Ramscar, M. (2002). The roles of body and mind in abstract thought. Psychological Science, 13(2), 185–188.
- Boroditsky, L. (2001). Does language shape thought? Mandarin and English speakers' conceptions of time. Cognitive Psychology, 43(1), 1–22.
- Boroditsky, L. (2000). Metaphoric Structuring: Understanding time through spatial metaphors. Cognition, 75(1), 1–28.
