= Sara Ahmed =

English-Australian scholar (born 1969)

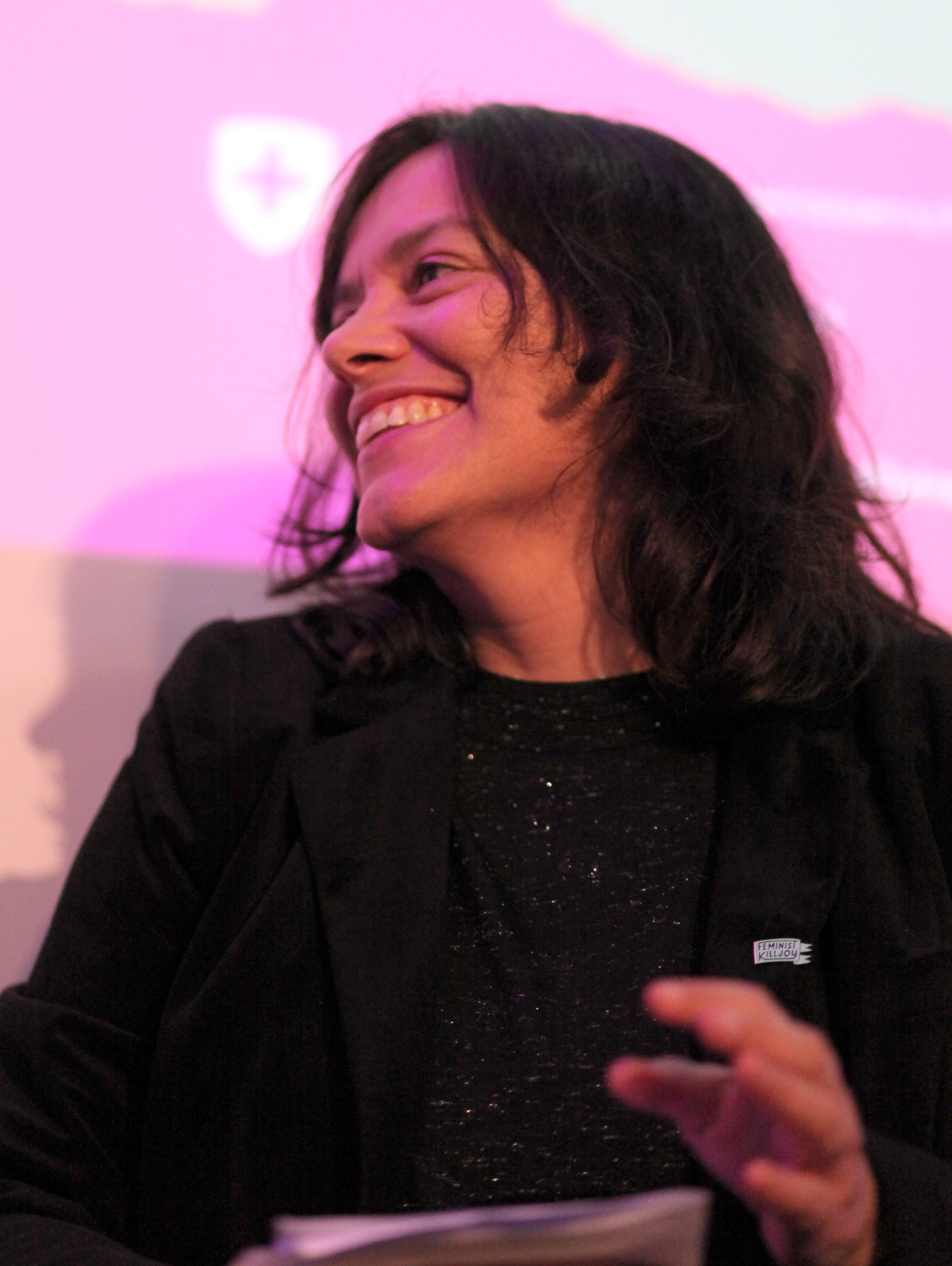
- Ahmed lecturing in Geneva in 2019
- Born: 30 August 1969 (age 57); Salford, England
- Education: University of Adelaide; Cardiff University
- Occupations: Writer, professor, independent feminist scholar
- Employer(s): Lancaster University; Goldsmiths, University of London; Rutgers University
- Known for: Feminist theory, lesbian feminism, queer theory, critical race theory, postcolonialism, affect theory
- Partner: Sarah Franklin
- Website: www.saranahmed.com

Sara Ahmed (born 30 August 1969) is a British-Australian writer and scholar whose area of study includes the intersection of feminist theory, queer theory, affect theory, critical race theory and postcolonialism. Her foundational work, The Cultural Politics of Emotion, in which she explores the social dimension and circulation of emotions, is recognized as a foundational text in the nascent field of affect theory.

== Life ==
Ahmed was born in Salford, England on 30 August 1969. She is the daughter of a Pakistani father and an English mother, and she emigrated from England to Adelaide, Australia with her family in the early 1970s. Key themes in her work, such as migration, orientation, difference, strangeness, and mixed identities, relate directly to some of these early experiences. She completed her first degree at the University of Adelaide and doctoral research at the Centre for Critical and Cultural Theory, Cardiff University. She now lives on the outskirts of Cambridge with her partner, Sarah Franklin, who is an academic at the University of Cambridge.

== Career ==
Ahmed was based at the Institute for Women's Studies at Lancaster University from 1994 to 2004, and is one of its former directors. She was appointed to the Department of Media and Communications at Goldsmiths, University of London in 2004, and was the inaugural director of its Centre for Feminist Research, which was set up 'to consolidate Goldsmiths' feminist histories and to help shape feminist futures at Goldsmiths.'

In spring 2009 Ahmed was the Laurie New Jersey Chair in Women's Studies at Rutgers University and in Lent 2013 she was the Diane Middlebrook and Carl Djerassi Professor in Gender Studies at Cambridge University, where she conducted research on "Willful Women: Feminism and a History of Will". In 2015 she was the keynote speaker at the National Women's Studies Association (NWSA) annual conference. In 2016 Ahmed resigned from her post at Goldsmiths in protest over the alleged sexual harassment of students by staff there. She indicated that she would continue her work as an independent scholar.

Ahmed blogs at feministkilljoys, a project she continues to update. The blog is a companion to her book Living a Feminist Life (2017) that enables her to reach people; posts become chapters and the book becomes blogging material. The term "feminist killjoy" "became a communication device, a way of reaching people who recognized in her something of their own experience."

== Theories ==
=== Intersectionality ===
Intersectionality is essential to Ahmed's feminism. She states that "intersectionality is a starting point, the point from which we must proceed if we are to offer an account of how power works." She agrees with bell hooks, stating that if we aim to end sexism etc., we must also look at the other things attached, like racism and colonial power which molded our current society. To Ahmed, intersectionality is how we "make a point of how we come into existence." "How we can experience intersections," though, can be "frustrating, exhausting, painful."

Intersectionality is important to Ahmed, as it defines her own feminism and sense of self: “I am not a lesbian one moment and a person of color the next and a feminist at another. I am all of these at every moment. And lesbian feminism of color brings this all into existence, with insistence, with persistence.”

=== Diversity work ===
Diversity work is one of Ahmed's common topics. Included in many of her works, including Living a Feminist Life and On Being Included, it is a concept that makes tangible what it means to live a feminist life day to day in institutions. To Ahmed, diversity work is "[learning] about the techniques of power in the effort to transform institutional norms or in an effort to be in a world that does not accommodate our being." Diversity work is not any one thing. It is the act of trying to change an institution, and also simply the act of existing in one when it was not meant for you. She draws upon her experiences as a woman of color in academia and the works of others, including Chandra Talpade Mohanty, M. Jacqui Alexander, and Heidi Mirza.

=== Lesbian feminism of color ===
To Ahmed, lesbian feminism of color is "the struggle to put ourselves back together because within lesbian shelters too our being was not always accommodated." She draws upon the work of other lesbian feminists of color, like Cherie Moraga, Gloria Anzaldua, and Audre Lorde. These women have taken part in the effort to write "[themselves] into existence." Ahmed sees the texts of these women and many others like them to be a "lifeline".

=== Killjoy feminism ===
To Ahmed, practicing feminism is integral to the embodiment of living a feminist life. Ahmed's Killjoy Manifesto feministkilljoy blog elucidate the tenets of living and practicing life through a feminist philosophy, while also creating space for sharing how these embodiments create tension in life experiences under systems of patriarchy and oppression. She also addresses such tensions, and how institutions treat those who raise problems (e.g. about sexual harassment) as themselves the problem, in her 2021 book Complaint!

Inspired by Ahmed's notion of the feminist killjoy, T.L. Cowan proposed the "transfeminist kill/joy". This expression of transfeminism harnesses rage against transphobia and transmisogyny, along with the transformational love used to survive this environment, to disrupt exclusive forms of feminism and repair them. Example works in this mode include Mirha-Soleil Ross' Yapping Out Loud, Ryka Aoki's "To the New World", and the multi-artist Fully Functional Cabaret.

=== Affect and phenomenology ===
Ahmed's work is deeply interested in both lived experience analysis and the analysis of affect or emotion. She often analyzes structures of emotion as social phenomena that dictate the way we lead our lives. For example, in "The Promise of Happiness," she explores the way that happiness acts as "social pressure" to push individuals towards or away from certain experiences, objects, and behaviours. This intersects with her study of queerness in "Happy Objects", where she describes the experience of being a young queer person at a family dinner table being overlooked by ancestral photos of heterosexual nuclear families.

== Awards ==
2017, Ahmed received the Kessler Award for contributions to the field of LGBTQ studies from CLAGS, CUNY. Ahmed gave a talk, "Queer Use," when accepting this award.

2019, Ahmed was awarded an honorary doctorate from Malmö University, Sweden. She gave a lecture, "Feminists at Work: Diversity, Complaint, Institutions" as honorary doctor.

== Works ==
Ahmed has been described as a prolific writer: reviewing Ahmed's work, gender studies scholar Margrit Shildrick commented, "Few academic writers working in the UK context today can match Sara Ahmed in her prolific output, and fewer still can maintain the consistently high level of her theoretical explorations." Ahmed has written eleven single-authored books.

=== Books ===
==== Differences that Matter: Feminist Theory and Postmodernism ====
Published in 1998 by Cambridge University Press. Ahmed's main focus in this book revolves around the question "is or should feminism be modern or postmodern?" She reflects on what she feels postmodernism is doing to the world in different contexts.

==== Strange Encounters: Embodied Others in Post-Coloniality ====
Published in 2000 by Routledge.

==== The Cultural Politics of Emotion ====
Published in 2004 (with a second edition in 2014) by Edinburgh University Press. Ahmed discusses a contact zone, where objects and bodies that could create different affects are joined. Ahmed further argues that our emotions are formed through our contact with images and objects. .

==== Queer Phenomenology: Orientations, Objects, Others ====
Published in 2006 by Duke University Press. Ahmed often focuses on the subject of orientation and being orientated in space, especially in relationship to sexual orientation. In her book Queer Phenomenology: Orientation, Objects, Others, Ahmed states that orientation refers to the objects and others that we turn to face as well as the space that we inhabit, and how it is that we inhabit that space. Ahmed brings together queer phenomenology as a way of conveying that orientation is situated in the lived experience.

==== The Promise of Happiness ====
Published in 2010 by Duke University Press. This work was awarded the Feminist and Women's Studies Association (FWSA) book prize in 2011 for "ingenuity and scholarship in the fields of feminism, gender or women’s studies". In this book, Ahmed focuses on what it means to be worthy of happiness and how specific acts of deviation work with particular identities to cause unhappiness, how happiness is narrated and the idea of utilitarianism. She also discusses how certain lifestyles and life-narratives are framed as a means of happiness through the privileging of these ideals and social regulation.

==== On Being Included: Racism and Diversity in Institutional Life ====
Published in 2012 by Duke University Press. In On Being Included, Ahmed "offers an account of the diversity world". She explores institutional racism and whiteness, and the difficulties diversity workers face in trying to overcome them in their institutions.

==== Willful Subjects ====
Published by Duke University Press in 2014. Ahmed focuses on the idea of willfulness as resistance. She adds that willfulness involves persistence in having been brought down. Ahmed's goal throughout this book was to "spill the container" as willfulness provides a container for perversion.

==== Living a Feminist Life ====
Published in 2017 by Duke University Press. Ahmed's blog, "feministkilljoys", was written at the same time as "Living a Feminist Life" (2017). As the title suggests, Ahmed explores feminist theory, and what it means on our everyday lives. One way this manifests is in diversity work, something to which she dedicated a third of the book. She also spends much of the book exploring the feminist killjoy, the feminist in action who takes up the call in their everyday life. In 2020, Duke University Press confirmed that Living a Feminist Life was their best-selling book of the previous decade.

==== What's the Use? On the Uses of Use ====
Published in 2019 by Duke University Press. Ahmed gives the historical idea on the association of use with life and strength in the 19th century and how utilitarianism helped shape individuals through useful ends. She also explores how use comes with restricted spaces. Ahmed then explores the ideas for queer use.

==== Complaint! ====
Published in 2021 by Duke University Press. According to the publisher: "examines what we can learn about power from those who complain about abuses of power. Drawing on oral and written testimonies from academics and students who have made complaints about harassment, bullying, and unequal working conditions at universities, Ahmed explores the gap between what is supposed to happen when complaints are made and what actually happens."

==== The Feminist Killjoy Handbook ====
Published in 2023 by Seal Press. Building on the figure of the feminist killjoy, Sara Ahmed presents an analysis of literature, film, and distinguished feminist works while weaving alongside it her lived experience as a queer feminist scholar-activist of colour. She highlights how killing joy is a world-making project, chronicling moves from asking questions to the power of the eye roll. Feminist scholar Judith Butler has reviewed Ahmed’s book in their article titled The Snap for the monthly magazine The Nation in 2024. The book has also been reviewed for academic journals.

=== Co-edited books ===
- Uprootings/Regroundings: Questions of Home and Migration, Published by in 2013 by Oxford
- Thinking Through the Skin, Published in 2001 by Routledge
- Transformations: Thinking Through Feminism, Published in 2000 by Routledge

=== Edited and co-edited journals ===
- Sexism, Published in 2015 by New Formations
- Happiness, Published in 2008 by New Formations
