= Gordon H. Bower =

American psychologist (1932–2020)

- Born: December 30, 1932; Scio, Ohio, United States
- Died: June 17, 2020 (aged 87); Stanford, California, United States
- Education: Western Reserve University
- Awards: National Medal of Science (2005)
- Scientific career
- Fields: Cognitive psychology
- Workplaces: Stanford University
- Doctoral advisor: Frank A. Logan
- Notable students: John R. Anderson, Lawrence W. Barsalou, Lera Boroditsky, Keith Holyoak, Stephen Kosslyn, Alan Lesgold, Mark A. Gluck, Robert Sternberg

Gordon Howard Bower (December 30, 1932 – June 17, 2020) was a cognitive psychologist studying human memory, language comprehension, emotion, and behavior modification. He received his Ph.D. in learning theory from Yale University in 1959. He held the A. R. Lang Emeritus Professorship at Stanford University. In addition to his research, Bower also was a notable adviser to numerous students, including John R. Anderson, Lawrence W. Barsalou, Lera Boroditsky, Keith Holyoak, Stephen Kosslyn, Alan Lesgold, Mark A. Gluck, and Robert Sternberg, among others.

He was voted number 42 in the list of most notable psychologists of the 20th century, published by the Review of General Psychology. He was awarded the National Medal of Science in 2005.

== General Information ==
Gordon H. Bower was a cognitive psychologist. His main areas of study include human memory, mnemonic devices, retrieval strategies, recording strategies, and category learning. He was interested in cognitive processes, emotion, imagery, language and reading comprehension as they relate to memory. He was married to Sharon, the founder of a communication consulting firm who has published three self-help books on speech anxiety. Together, they have three children.

== Early life ==
Bower was born on December 30, 1932, in Scio, Ohio, to Clyde Ward and Mabel (Bosart). His father worked as a grocery store owner and his mother was a teacher. During high school, he was encouraged by his teachers to pursue a career in psychiatry. Out of high school, he accepted a four-year scholarship to play baseball at Cleveland's Western Reserve University and during his freshman year, began working in the Cleveland State Mental Hospital. In order to avoid the military draft, Bower opted for graduate school, but his experiences in the mental hospital dissuaded him from a career as a psychiatrist.

While Bower was attending Yale for his degree in Experimental Psychology, under Neal Miller, he discovered a passion for learning theory and presented his findings on dual reward-punishment in rats to the American Psychological Association. During this time, he and Bill Estes also revised Edward Tolman's vicarious trial and error model to include human choices among commodity options. Bower married Sharon Anthony on January 30, 1957.

== Career ==
Bower earned his Ph.D. in psychology from Yale University in 1959 and was hired at the Stanford Psychology Department. Until the late 1960s, he continued the animal research he had begun as a graduate student, but when Bill Estes and Dick Atkinson joined the faculty, his focus shifted to mathematical models of memory. One model they produced explained "hypothesis testing behavior of subjects learning very simple classifications (concepts) in the standard trial-by-trial procedures that overtaxed memory." After wearying of studying models of memory, Bower shifted his focus to study short-term memory. He worked on a team that created both the time-decay queuing model and the fixed-space displacement model to describe how items in short-term memory might be lost before they could be encoded in long-term memory. This spawned into research into how organizational devices could expand the capacity of short-term memory past the traditional 7 items. A particular mnemonic device that Bower researched that is still popular today is chunking, in which a person groups objects together to improve memory. His works during this time also included the huge benefits of mnemonic aids and how these aids are often converted into visual images, human associative memory and propositional learning, state dependent memory, connectionist modeling for categorical learning, and how we remember narratives.

In 1979 he was honored with the Award for Distinguished Scientific Contribution by the American Psychological Association. In 2005, Bower took emeritus status from Stanford and received the President's National Medal of Science.

Bower died on June 17, 2020, at his home in Stanford, California.

== See also ==
- List of psychologists

== Sources ==
- APA Historical Database
