= Richard E. Ripple =

American educational psychologist and professor (1931 - 2010)

- Born: 1931
- Died: 2010 (aged 78–79)
- Scientific career
- Fields: Educational psychology
- Workplaces: Cornell University

Richard E. Ripple (1931–2010) was an American educational psychologist. He was a professor at Cornell University for 49 years and editor-in-chief of the Educational Psychologist from 1969 to 1972.
