= Educational Research Review =

Academic journal

- Discipline: Educational psychology
- Language: English
- Edited by: Hans Gruber

Publication details
- History: 2006–present
- Publisher: Elsevier
- Frequency: Triannual
- Impact factor: 11.7 (2022)

Standard abbreviations
- ISO 4: Educ. Res. Rev.

Indexing
- ISSN: 1747-938X
- LCCN: 2006207021
- OCLC no.: 884374822

Links
- Journal homepage; Online archive

Educational Research Review is a triannual peer-reviewed academic review journal covering education. It was established in 2006 and is published by Elsevier on behalf of the European Association for Research on Learning and Instruction (EARLI). The editor-in-chief is Hans Gruber (University of Regensburg). According to the Journal Citation Reports, the journal has a 2022 impact factor of 11.7.
