= John F. Feldhusen =

American psychologist (1926–2009)

John Frederic Feldhusen (1926–2009) was an American educational psychologist who worked on gifted education.

== Early life ==
He was born in Waukesha, Wisconsin on May 5, 1926.

He received undergraduate and graduate degrees from the University of Wisconsin.

== Work ==
In 1961 he joined the faculty at Purdue University. He would work there for more than forty years, obtaining the post of Robert B. Kane Distinguished Professor of Educational Psychology and Gifted Education.

He was the editor of Educational Psychologist from 1966 to 1969.

He founded the Purdue Gifted Education Resource Institute in 1977 and was its director until 1995.

== Personal life ==
He married Hazel Artz in 1954 and they had two daughters.
