= Melville Shavelson =

American screenwriter

- Born: April 1, 1917; Brooklyn, New York, U.S.
- Died: August 8, 2007 (aged 90); Studio City, California, U.S.
- Occupations: Film director, producer, and screenwriter
- Spouse(s): Lucille Shavelson (died 2000) Ruth Florea (m. 2001)
- Children: Lynne Joiner; Richard Shavelson

Melville Shavelson (April 1, 1917 – August 8, 2007) was an American film director, producer, screenwriter, and author. He was President of the Writers Guild of America, West (WGAw) from 1969 to 1971, 1979 to 1981, and 1985 to 1987.

== Biography ==
Shavelson was born to a Jewish family in Brooklyn and graduated from Cornell University, where he was a humor columnist for The Cornell Daily Sun, in 1937. He worked as a writer on comedian Bob Hope's radio show, The Pepsodent Show Starring Bob Hope. Shavelson came to Hollywood in 1938 as one of Hope's joke writers, a job he held for the next five years. He was responsible for the screenplays of such Hope films as The Princess and the Pirate (1944), Where There's Life (1947), The Great Lover (1949), and Sorrowful Jones (1949), which also starred Lucille Ball.

Shavelson was nominated twice for Academy Awards for Best Original Screenplay—first for 1955's The Seven Little Foys, starring Hope in a rare dramatic role, and then for 1958's Houseboat. He shared both nominations with Jack Rose. He also directed both films. Other films he wrote and directed include Beau James (1957), The Five Pennies (1959) (for which he won a Screen Writers Guild Award), It Started in Naples (1960), On the Double (1961), The Pigeon That Took Rome (1962), A New Kind of Love (1963), Cast a Giant Shadow (1966), and Yours, Mine and Ours (1968), which starred Henry Fonda and again with Lucille Ball.

Shavelson created two Emmy Award-winning television series, Make Room for Daddy and My World and Welcome to It, and wrote for a dozen Academy Award shows. He wrote, produced, and co-directed the six-hour 1979 ABC miniseries Ike, based on the World War II exploits of General Dwight Eisenhower.

His autobiography, published by BearManor Media in April 2007, is How to Succeed in Hollywood Without Really Trying, P.S. — You Can't!. He wrote several other books, including, with Mr. Hope, Don't Shoot, It's Only Me: Bob Hope's Comedy History of the United States (Putnam, 1990), and How to Make a Jewish Movie (1971), a memoir of his experiences while producing and directing Cast a Giant Shadow, and the Hollywood-themed novel Lualda (1973).

Shavelson was a noted instructor at USC's Master of Professional Writing Program from 1998 to 2006. He taught screenwriting and often cracked to his students, "I'm a writer by choice, a producer by necessity and a director in self-defense."

== Personal life ==
He was an amateur radio operator and held the callsign W6VLH.

Shavelson and his first wife, Lucille, had two children: Lynne Joiner and Richard Shavelson. Lucille died in 2000. Shavelson was married to his second wife, Ruth Florea, from 2001 until he died in 2007; they resided in Studio City, California.

Shavelson died of natural causes on August 8, 2007, at his home, he was 90 years old. He was survived by a sister, Geraldine Youcha of Manhattan and New City, New York; two children from his first marriage, Richard of Menlo Park, California, and Lynne Joiner of Washington; and three grandchildren.

== Honors, awards and legacy ==
The Shavelson Film Awards, given annually at Cornell University for promising filmmakers, were established by him and named in his honor.
