= Roger Säljö =

Swedish educational psychologist (born 1948)

Roger Säljö (born 2 April 1948) is a Swedish educational psychologist whose research presents a socio-cultural perspective on human learning and development. Säljö is a professor of education and educational psychology at University of Gothenburg and was president of the European Association for Research on Learning and Instruction (EARLI) between 2005 and 2007. In the Spring of 1994, he was a Fellow at the Swedish Collegium for Advanced Study in Uppsala, Sweden. Roger Säljö is the director of a national centre of excellence in research. In 2012, Roger Säljö co-founded the academic journal Learning, Culture and Social Interaction.

== See also ==
- Ference Marton
