= Lauren Resnick =

American psychologist

Lauren B. Resnick is an educational psychologist who has made notable contributions to the cognitive science of learning and instruction. She is a professor of psychology at the University of Pittsburgh, and was previously director of the University's Learning Research and Development Center. In 1986-1987, Resnick was the president of the American Educational Research Association. She received the 1998 E. L. Thorndike Award from the American Psychological Association.

== Career ==
In addition to working as a research associate for the Harvard University Committee on Programmed Instruction and Laboratory for Research in Instruction and then as a lecturer in the Office of Research and Evaluation in the Division of Teacher Education at City University of New York, Resnick also served as a Senior Scientist and Staff Consultant at Basic Systems, Inc. before accepting her first faculty position at the University of Pittsburgh. As a faculty member, educational researcher, and scholar, Resnick has dedicated more than 50 years to conducting pioneering research on learning and development, scientific understanding in children, and socially shared cognition.

As past president of the American Educational Research Association (AERA, 1986-1987) and a member of both the National Academy of Education (NAE) and International Academy of Education (IAE), she has served as an invited lecturer, visiting scholar, and keynote speaker at universities around the world.

In her book "Education and Learning to Think" (The National Academies Press, 1987) and the 1987 Presidential Address, she proposed that the concept of out of school learning is very beneficial for children and young adults. In her address she stated: "Because they are continuously engaged with objects and situations that make sense to them, people do not fall into the trap of forgetting what their calculation or their reasoning is about".

== Publications ==
As of 2016, Resnick had authored or co-authored more than 200 scholarly works that had been cited more than 25,000 times. These include:

- Socializing Intelligence Through Academic Talk and Dialogue (2015, with C. Asterhan and S. L. Clarke);
- Reading and Writing with Understanding (2009, with S. Hampton);
- Reading and Writing Grade by Grade (2009, with S. Hampton);
- Speaking and Listening for Preschool through Third Grade (2009, with C. E. Snow).

== Awards and honors ==
Resnick has received numerous awards and honors including:

- 1986-1987 President of the American Educational Research Association
- Fellow of the American Psychological Association (APA)
- Fellow of the American Association for the Advancement of Science (AAAS)
- Lifetime National Associate of the National Academies of Sciences (Engineering and Medicine)
- Award for Distinguished Contributions to Research in Education (AERA, 1990)
- 1998 Edward L. Thorndike Award for Distinguished Psychological Contributions to Education
- 1999 Oeuvre Award for Outstanding Contributions to the Science of Learning and Instruction from the European Association for Research on Learning and Instruction
- Award for Distinguished Contributions of Applications of Psychology to Education and Training (APA, 2007)
- Wallace Foundation Distinguished Lecture Award (AERA, 2009)
- FABBS Award (Fabbs Foundation, 2011)

== Early life and education ==
Having discovered her passion for history and literature while pursuing her bachelor's degree at Radcliffe College, Resnick continued her studies earning both a master's degree in teaching and her doctorate from Harvard University before teaching abroad at the American School of Paris.

== See also ==
- Alan Lesgold

Educational offices
| Preceded by David Berliner | President of the American Educational Research Association; 1986–1987 | Succeeded by Richard Shavelson |
