= Lawrence W. Barsalou =

American psychologist

Lawrence Barsalou
- Born: November 3, 1951 (age 73); San Diego, California, U.S.
- Education: University of California, San Diego (B.A., 1977); Stanford University (Ph.D., 1981)
- Scientific career
- Fields: Cognitive psychology
- Institutions: University of Chicago, Georgia Institute of Technology, Emory University, University of Glasgow
- Thesis: Context-independent and context-dependent information in concepts (1982)
- Doctoral advisor: Gordon Bower

Lawrence W. Barsalou (born November 3, 1951) is an American psychologist and a cognitive scientist, currently working at the University of Glasgow.

== Career ==
At the University of Glasgow, Barsalou is a professor of psychology, performing research in the Institute of Neuroscience and Psychology. He received a bachelor's degree in psychology from the University of California, San Diego in 1977 (George Mandler, advisor), and a Ph.D. in Cognitive Psychology from Stanford University in 1981 (Gordon Bower, advisor). Since then, Barsalou has held faculty positions at Emory University, the Georgia Institute of Technology, and the University of Chicago, joining the University of Glasgow in 2015.

Barsalou’s research has been funded by the National Science Foundation and other US funding agencies. He has held a Guggenheim fellowship, served as the chair of the Cognitive Science Society, and won an award for graduate teaching from the University of Chicago. Barsalou is a Fellow of the American Association for the Advancement of Science, the American Psychological Association, the Association for Psychological Science, the Cognitive Science Society, the Mind and Life Institute, and the Society of Experimental Psychologists. He is a winner of the Distinguished Cognitive Science Award from the University of California, Merced.

== Research ==
Barsalou's research addresses the nature of human conceptual processing and its roles in perception, memory, language, thought, social interaction, and health cognition. Across domains, much of this work focuses on the impact of goals and environmental context on cognitive processing, as well as how multimodal simulation, situated conceptualization, and embodiment ground conceptual processing.

=== Ad hoc categories ===
Perhaps Barsalou’s most notable contribution to the field of cognitive psychology is his research on ad hoc, or goal-derived, categories. Prior to this work, the vast majority of research on the cognitive representation of categories dealt solely with taxonomic categories, in which category membership is established due to overlap in both conceptual and physical features. However, Barsalou (1983) posited that this is not the only type of category. While featural relatedness intrinsically forms taxonomic categories that can be used to guide cognition, the formation of other types of categories is required for us to accomplish goals. These categories, termed ad hoc categories, are actively constructed from existing knowledge in order to satisfy the demands of a specific goal context. Ad hoc categories differ from traditional categories in two principle ways. First, they violate the correlational structure of the environment. In line with previous work by Rosch et al. (1976), properties of items within the environment are not independent, but rather certain attributes tend to co-occur within specific categories. However, this is not a requirement for ad hoc category membership, given that relatedness is construed based on goal satisfaction rather than featural relatedness. Second, in contrast to taxonomic categories, ad hoc categories are often constructed on-line, and thus are not well established within long-term memory. However, it is thought that while ad hoc categories are representationally distinct from taxonomic categories, they exhibit a comparable graded similarity structure, in which a member of the category may be seen as more prototypical of the given category compared to other members.

Barsalou (1991) used the classic ad hoc category example of things to pack for a vacation. When packing for a trip, one actively constructs this category in order to pack the appropriate items. For new goal-based categories, planners must derive the ad hoc categories themselves before they can consider and select appropriate category members, or instantiations. Planners would then use well established knowledge of other categories to generate candidates for the ad hoc category and then test them for membership. For example, one might use the established knowledge of the category of clothing to consider whether or not they need to pack a bathing suit for their vacation- if they decide in the affirmative, then bathing suit becomes a member of the ad hoc category. Thus, Barsalou (1991) posited that ad hoc category members would not necessarily share many features (i.e., bathing suit, money, toothpaste), but would nevertheless be members of the same ad hoc category because they similarly satisfy the requirements of the current behavioral goal of things to pack for vacation. This work has been exceptionally influential within the study of categories, and has played a large role in illuminating the flexibility of semantic relatedness and the influence of specific behavioral goals on short and long-term conceptual representations.

=== Grounded cognition ===
Barsalou has also been an outspoken advocate for grounded views of cognition, and has developed several influential models of grounded cognitive processing within specific domains. According to traditional cognitive theory, semantic memory is represented in an amodal format and is distinct from the low-level perceptual processes used to encode information from the surrounding environment. However, beginning with the influential work by Lakoff & Johnson (1980), some cognitive scientists, including Barsalou, have posited that cognitive representations are actually deeply embodied, such that semantic memory representations are directly mediated by perceptual systems. Barsalou, in particular, has contributed much research to the field of grounded cognition. According to Barsalou (2008), grounded cognition refers to the belief that simulations within specific sensory systems, bodily states, and situated action mediate all cognitive processing. Citing evidence from psycholinguistic, action planning, and social cognition research, Barsalou has suggested that grounded cognition is well positioned to facilitate the development of testable models within cognitive psychology. He has gone on to use a grounded approach to diverse areas within cognitive psychology, including conceptual representations, attitudes, emotion, prejudice, mindfulness, and eating behaviors.

==== Perceptual symbol systems theory ====
Barsalou’s most notable contribution to grounded cognition is the development of perceptual symbol systems theory. According to perceptual symbol systems theory, bottom-up patterns of activation within sensory-motor areas become associated during perception, and thus become perceptually-based symbols. Barsalou suggests that attentional mechanisms then bind these diverse perceptual components into stable networks of associations, termed simulators, which are then stored in long-term memory. Then, during normal conceptual activation, top-down cognitive processes reactivate the simulators associated with these perceptual symbols, such that representation is directly the result of simulated sensory experiences. While this may account for item-level simulations, perceptual symbol systems theory can also account for category-based cognitive processing. The theory states that after repeatedly experiencing members of a category over time, the associated sensorimotor activation develops into a stable simulator that is used to represent the category as a whole. These simulators are thus able to integrate multimodal information from both within and across experiences with category members. Moreover, these simulators are not limited to specific types of entities, but can be used to represent objects, events, actions, introspections, and relational properties.

Perceptual Symbol Systems theory has also been used to account for both prediction and the simulation of novel events. Barsalou (2009) states that when we encounter a familiar situation, sensorimotor based representations of the situation are activated. Given that this form of simulation is essentially indexing a specific pattern of sensorimotor activation, this form of grounded representation may then serve as a rich source for prediction through pattern completion mechanisms. In addition, novel events may be simulated by combinatorially and recursively combining discrete aspects of simulation from known concepts. Barsalou also suggests that such processes underlie the experiences of proprioception and introspection. Specifically, Barsalou (1999) notes that the experience of introspection may be associated in tandem with sensorimotor based representations, and thus allow the representation of complex abstract concepts that were previously thought to be outside the scope of grounded theory. Perceptual symbol systems theory has served as a pioneering model of grounded processing, and has been especially influential in modelling the embodiment of linguistic symbols within cognition and the broad role of simulation within conceptual representation.

=== Affective and health cognition ===
In recent years, Barsalou has begun applying this grounded approach to topics within affective and health cognition. Within affective cognition, Barsalou has focused on elucidating and modelling embodiment within attitudes, social perception, and emotion. Niedenthal et al. (2005) suggest that the current research on social perception indicates that embodied representations underlie social mimicry and imitation, while categorical priming studies investigating embodied attitudes suggest that this embodiment can bias physical response. Moreover, the embodiment of these social factors is thought to occur even when the actual social targets are absent.

Barsalou has also conducted research within the field of health cognition. Barsalou has contributed research to the area of mindfulness, especially in regards to how it may serve to interrupt maladaptive on-line cognitive processing. Tincher, Lebois, & Barsalou (2016) found that a brief mindfulness intervention resulted in a decrease in intergroup bias, or the bias in favor of one's in-group and against one's out-group. In addition, Papies et al. (2014) found that mindfulness could broadly modulate the link between motivation and behavior. Assuming a grounded approach, they posited that encountering attractive stimuli engages reward simulations, which may then be enhanced by a given motivational state. They found that practised mindfulness of those motivational states decreased the enhancement of reward simulations, and thus led to a decrease in appetitive behavior.

Barsalou has also used this grounded approach to examine the maintenance of habits, especially within the context of eating behavior. Chen, Papies & Barsalou (2016) suggest that all eating behavior may be modelled in relation to one another within a common theoretical framework, termed the core eating network. According to this network, eating behavior is mediated by a ventral reward pathway and a dorsal control pathway. In line with a grounded approach to cognition, this network also assumes that the neural areas activated during simulations of eating are the same as those involved during actual eating. That is, they posit that food stimuli activate reward-based simulations that may serve to motivate its consumption. They also suggest that several factors, including food significance, eating disorders, body mass index, and eating goals may all modulate the activity of specific areas within the core eating network.

== Selected bibliography ==
- Barsalou, Lawrence. Cognitive psychology: An overview for cognitive scientists. (1992) Lawrence Erlbaum Associates. ISBN 978-0898599664.
