= Eva Bendix Petersen =

Australian academic

Academic background
- Education: Københavns Universitet
- Thesis: Academic boundary work : the discursive constitution of "scientificity" amongst researchers within the social sciences and humanities (2004)

Eva Bendix Petersen is a psychologist and sociologist of education. In her academic work, she was Professor of Higher Education in the Department of People and Technology at Roskilde University, Denmark. She is known for her work on academic cultures and practice, her critique of the neoliberalisation of universities, and her experimentation with new scientific genres, for example, ethnographic dramas. As a practicing psychotherapist, she works primarily with narrative and systems theory, and emotionally focussed therapy.
