= Parallel Play (book) =

Book by Tim Page

- Author: Tim Page
- Language: English
- Genre: Autobiography
- Publisher: Doubleday (original edition); Anchor Books (revised version)
- Publication date: September 7, 2009 (original edition); September 7, 2010 (revised version)
- Publication place: United States
- Media type: Hardcover/ revised version paperback
- Pages: 198 pp.
- ISBN: 978-0-7679-2969-1
- OCLC: 2009003595
- Dewey Decimal: 362.196/85883200092
- LC Class: RC553.A88 P34 2009

Parallel Play is a memoir by Tim Page, originally issued, over the author's objections, as Parallel Play: Growing Up With Undiagnosed Asperger's. (The subtitle was dropped after the first edition.) Published in 2009 by Doubleday, Parallel Play describes Page's early life, growing up in Storrs, Connecticut, where he was regularly described as a genius and became known as a precocious filmmaker through the documentary A Day With Timmy Page.

Yet he was personally remote, an underachiever in school and subject to depression and anxiety throughout his life. Eventually, he became a writer and critic and won the Pulitzer Prize for Criticism in 1997. Three years later, he was diagnosed with Asperger syndrome, which Page describes as "one of those rare clinical confirmations met mostly with relief" as it explained many of the difficulties he had experienced growing up.

In August 2007, a 5000-word article entitled Parallel Play was published in The New Yorker. The article was specifically about Page's Asperger syndrome. The book is more general, covering Page's personal quirks, his drug-taking in youth, and a fatal accident in which he was a passenger.

In his preface to the Anchor Books edition, Page disavowed the "Undiagnosed Asperger's" subtitle and described Parallel Play as a "quirky memoir that could have been subtitled 'Old Records and Silent Movies', 'Eastern Connecticut in the 1960s', or, to borrow a line from the Three Stooges, 'Loco Boy Makes Good'."
