= Mark A. Gluck =

American neuroscientist

- Born: Philadelphia, Pennsylvania
- Education: Harvard University; Stanford University
- Scientific career
- Fields: Neuropsychology and Neuroscience
- Workplaces: Rutgers–Newark; Center for Molecular and Behavioral Neuroscience
- Doctoral advisor: Gordon H. Bower; Richard F. Thompson (postdoc)
- Other academic advisors: William Kaye Estes; Stephen Kosslyn

Mark A. Gluck is a professor of neuroscience at Rutgers–Newark in New Jersey, and director of the Rutgers Memory Disorders Project. His research focuses on the neural bases of learning and memory. He has authored Learning and Memory: From Brain to Behavior (Worth Publishers, 2008)., and co-authored Gateway to Memory: An Introduction to Neural Network Models of the Hippocampus.

== Graduate and postdoctoral training ==
Gluck attended Harvard University and double majored in Psychology and Computer Science. As an undergraduate student, Gluck worked under the supervision of William Kaye Estes on connectionist models of basic levels in category hierarchies. Gluck pursued a Ph.D. degree at Stanford University in Cognitive Psychology, with Gordon H. Bower as his Doctoral advisor. His dissertation focused on using network models to seek a rapprochement between theories of animal and human learning. It also included several experimental studies of human learning that validated predictions of the probabilistic category learning model that Gluck and Bower designed, and which was based on a generalization of the Rescorla–Wagner model of Pavlovian conditioning.

== Rutgers–Newark ==
Gluck became a faculty member of the Center for Molecular and Behavioral Neuroscience at Rutgers University-Newark in New Jersey. Gluck researched the functional role of the hippocampus in learning and memory with postdoctoral fellow, Catherine E. Myers. The following year, Gluck and Myers proposed a theory that a wide range of superficially disparate conditioning behaviors that depend on an intact hippocampal region can be understood as being those that require adaptive changes in the underlying representation of stimulus events.

Over the past two decades, Gluck has concentrated on understanding the fundamental principles and mechanisms of learning and memory through the integration of behavioral, biological and computational approaches. By utilizing novel cognitive tasks, Gluck has studied many disorders that are not traditionally viewed as learning disorders.

=== Research ===
==== Parkinson's disease ====
Gluck's lab has studied the cognitive effects of dopaminergic cell death in Parkinson's disease, as well as cognitive effects from the dopamine-replenishing medications. Utilizing computational modeling, Gluck has studied the effects of dopaminergic medication on reward and punishment learning in patients with Parkinson's disease. Gluck, working with his Hungarian collaborator, Szabolcs Keri, has also studied the effects of the alpha-synuclein molecule on reward and punishment learning, and has shown parallels with those who have alpha-synuclein with unmedicated Parkinson's patients. Currently, Gluck and his lab members are investigating the cognition of patients with Parkinson's disease who develop impulse control disorders.

==== Alzheimer's disease ====
Gluck, Myers, and their colleagues have developed hippocampal-sensitive learning tasks that predict future onset of Alzheimer's disease in humans as well as in mouse models.

==== Major depressive disorder ====
Gluck studied how patients with major depressive disorder who are taking anticholinergics demonstrate opposite learning patterns as compared to those not on anticholinergics.

Currently Gluck is studying the effects of depression on patients with Parkinson's disease.

==== Schizophrenia ====
Gluck conducts clinical and computational studies to better understand the links between the cognitive and psychiatric symptoms in schizophrenia. Recently, Gluck has found connections between the general functioning of schizophrenic patients and their performance on reward and punishment learning.

=== Outreach programs ===
==== Rutgers–Israel Biomedical Research & Education Exchange ====
Partnering with Israeli universities, hospitals, and army, Gluck has initiated several programs which strengthen ties between Rutgers and Israel, including two international US-Israeli-Palestinian brain conferences in Jerusalem (co-hosted by Hebrew University and Al-Quds University), a joint US Navy/Israeli Army study of posttraumatic stress disorder, studies of Parkinson's disease and cognition (with University of Haifa and Tel HaShomer hospital), and summer internship opportunities for Rutgers students in Israeli research labs.

==== Palestinian Neuroscience Initiative & Rutgers/Al-Quds Brain Research Exchange ====
Gluck has established a brain research and education exchange between Rutgers–Newark and Al-Quds University Medical School in the Palestinian Territories/West Bank, which encompasses programs in basic neuroscience, clinical neurology, psychiatry, neuropsychology, and geriatrics, and is intended to lead towards the foundation of a future Palestinian Neuroscience Institute at Al-Quds University Medical School.

==== African American Alzheimer's Awareness & Brain Health Initiative ====
Minority and economically disadvantaged seniors are at greater risk for Alzheimer's disease, due to environmental, lifestyle and behavioral factors. In collaboration with local community organizations, Gluck is developing educational and memory fitness programs to promote memory health, cognitive vitality, and a better understanding of Alzheimer's disease among seniors.

==== Memory Loss & The Brain newsletter ====
Memory Loss & the Brain, is a free public health newsletter, produced by Gluck which communicates to a wide audience the latest news and information about memory impairments due to disease, injury, and aging, and current findings on how they can be treated.

== Personal life ==
Gluck lives in the Greenwich Village neighborhood of New York City, where he was an early founding member of the Downtown Boathouse.

== Awards ==
- Office of Naval Research (ONR) Young Investigator Award
- APA Distinguished Scientific Award for an Early Career Contribution to Psychology
- National Science Foundation (NSF) Presidential Early Career Award for Scientists and Engineers
