= Robert L. Ebel =

American educational psychologist

Robert Ebel (November 14, 1910 – November 1982) was an American educational psychologist who specialized in educational measurement.

He was on the staff of Educational Testing Service (ETS) in Princeton, New Jersey, where he served as vice president from 1957 to 1963. While on the ETS staff, Ebel was president of the National Council on Measurement in Education from 1957 to 1958. From 1963 to 1981, he was a professor in the department of Counseling and Educational Psychology at Michigan State University. During this period, he was also president of the American Educational Research Association (1972–1973). Ebel was given the Distinguished Achievement in Educational Journalism award from the Educational Press Association of America and he received an award for Distinguished Service to Measurement from ETS. In addition to many research articles, Ebel authored the influential textbooks Measuring Educational Achievement and Essentials of Education Measurement.

== See also ==
Educational offices
Preceded by Robert Glaser	President of the American Educational Research Association; 1972–1973	Succeeded by Patrick Suppes
