= European Association for Research on Learning and Instruction =

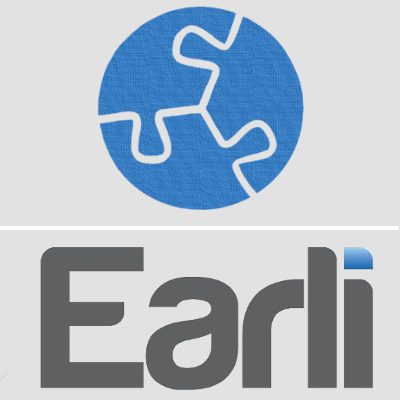
The EARLI logo

The European Association for Research on Learning and Instruction (EARLI) was founded at Leuven University (Belgium) in 1985 to support research in the field of learning and instruction. The association's main activities include a Biennial, international Conference, support of research groups such as SIGs, E-CER and EFGs and journal outlets for educational researchers in Europe. This non-profit membership association has about 2,500 members from over 60 countries, both European and beyond. The five best represented countries within EARLI's membership are Germany, The Netherlands, United Kingdom, United States and Finland.

Researchers can join the association through annual membership. On top of their general membership, EARLI supports several Special Interest Groups (SIG). These SIGs allow a smaller group of EARLI members to discuss specific educational themes. The main goal of the SIGs is to improve communication between researchers active in a similar field. Each SIG is governed by two coordinators who are assisted by a Junior Coordinator. Since the foundation of EARLI in 1985, 27 SIGs have been formed, covering a wide range of educational topics.

EARLI's sister organisation EAPRIL was formally founded in 2009 to "make practice and research in lifelong learning interact, collaborate and benefit from each other's strength."

== History ==
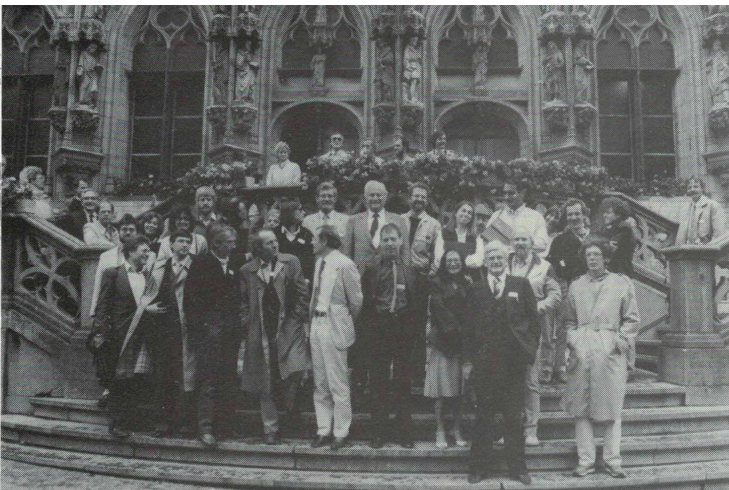
Inaugural EARLI Members Meeting in Leuven, 1985.

Since its foundation in 1985 EARLI has organised Biennial Conferences throughout Europe. The first EARLI conference took place in 1985 in Leuven, Belgium, from June 10–13.

The first EARLI President was Erik De Corte, who also was among the founders of the association. European professors in the field of learning and instruction, including Heinz Mandl, Erik De Corte, Erno Lehtinen, Neville Bennett, Pierro Boscolo and Roger Säljö, met often at the meetings of the American Educational Research Association which is where the first foundations for a European association were laid. Some 140 researchers attended the first EARLI conference, including scientists such as Dick Snow, Robert Glaser, Lauren Resnick and Bill Mc Keachie.

In 1999, a network of Junior Researchers (JURE) was established in order "to represent and support research students", and to further "learning and interaction among junior and senior researchers". Annual events organised for the JURE community are supported by the EARLI Office.

== Structure ==
EARLI is governed by an Executive Committee (EC) which is elected during a general assembly to take place at the Biennial EARLI Conferences. A President is chosen from within the EC and serves a two-year term. Previous EARLI Presidents include notable researchers such as Stella Vosniadou (1995–97), Monique Boekaerts (1999–2001) and Roger Säljö (2005 - 2007).

A permanent EARLI office was founded in 1997 in order to assist the growing membership and facilitate the organisation of Conferences and other events hosted by EARLI. The office is located in Leuven and currently employs five people. Patrick Belpaire acts as the Managing Director.

== Biennial conference ==
Since its foundation, EARLI has organised over 17 international conferences, in as many European countries. The aim of the Biennial EARLI Conference is to allow researchers in education, learning and instruction to meet face to face and discuss a wide variety of topics. The first Biennual EARLI Conference took place in Leuven, Belgium, where the association was founded.

== Journals ==
EARLI publishes several journals:

- Frontline Learning Research (FLR)
- Learning and Instruction
- Educational Research Review
- New Perspectives on Learning and Instruction

In addition, the journal Learning, Culture and Social Interaction is affiliated to EARLI.
