= David Tzuriel =

Israeli psychologist

David Tzuriel (Hebrew: דוד צוריאל) is an Israeli clinical and educational psychologist. His expertise is dynamic assessment. Currently he works as a professor at Bar Ilan University. He was born on September 23, 1946.
