= Robert Glaser =

American psychologist (1921–2012)

Robert Glaser (January 18, 1921 – February 4, 2012) was an American educational psychologist, who has made significant contributions to theories of learning and instruction. The key areas of his research focused on the nature of aptitudes and individual differences, the interaction of knowledge and skill in expertise, the roles of testing and technology in education, and training adapted to individual differences. Glaser has also been noted for having developed the idea of individually prescribed instruction as well as making major contributions to the theory of adaptive education.

His scholarship has been recognized by several awards including the American Educational Research Association Presidential Citation Award (2003), the American Psychological Association Distinguished Scientific Applications of Psychology award (1987), and the E.L. Thorndike Award for Distinguished Psychological Contributions to Education (1981). He was also a Guggenheim Fellowship recipient and a member of the Royal Norwegian Society of Sciences and Letters. He was elected to the American Academy of Arts and Sciences in 1965 and the American Philosophical Society in 2000.

Glaser was awarded honorary degrees from Indiana University, University of Gothenburg, University of Leuven, University of Victoria and McGill University, which summarized his contributions in the following manner:

An internationally recognized scholar who has helped define the field of instructional psychology, Robert Glaser has linked theories of learning, cognition and instruction. He founded the Learning Research and Development Center at the University of Pittsburgh, serving as its director until 1997.

In addition to founding and serving as the director of the Learning Research and Development Center at the University of Pittsburgh, Glaser served as president of the American Educational Research Association and the National Academy of Education. He authored or edited more than 20 books and 220 articles. Glaser died in February 2012 at the age of 91.

== Edited works ==
Glaser edited or co-edited a number of significant works.

- Lumsdaine A.A. & Glaser R. (eds) 1960. Teaching machines and programmed learning I: a source book. Washington D.C. National Education Association.
- Glaser R. (ed) 1962. Training research and education. New York: Columbia University Press, and 1965: Science Editions, Wiley.
- Glaser R. (ed) 1965. Teaching machines and programmed learning II: data and directions. Washington D.C. National Education Association.
- Glaser R. (ed) 1978. Research and development and school change. New York: Wiley. ISBN 0-470-26415-2
- Glaser R. (ed) 1983. Cognitive and motivational aspects of instruction: selected International Congress papers. Amsterdam: Elsevier
- Glaser R. (ed) 1978–2000. Advances in instructional psychology: educational design and cognitive science. Volumes 1–5. Mahwah, N.J. Lawrence Erlbaum and Associates. ISBN 0-470-26519-1

== See also ==
- Instructional design
- Educational psychology
- Alan Lesgold

Educational offices
Preceded by Robert Gagne	President of the American Educational Research Association; 1971–1972	Succeeded by Robert Ebel
Preceded by Wallace Sterling	Acting President of Stanford University; 1968	Succeeded by Kenneth Pitzer
