= Noel Entwistle =

UK educational psychologist

Noel Entwistle (born in 1936) is a UK educational psychologist who has made significant contributions to theories of student learning in higher education. He is particularly known for identifying the characteristics of, and influences on, deep and surface approaches to learning, and developing the Approaches to Studying Inventory (Entwistle & Ramsden, 1983) and the Approaches and Study Skills Inventory for Students (Entwistle, McCune & Tait, 2013). He also developed, with Ference Marton, the idea of 'knowledge objects' as structured understandings developed by students as they prepare for exams or writing essays (Entwistle & Marton, 1994). Entwistle was formerly editor of the British Journal of Education Psychology and also of the international journal Higher Education. He is a fellow of the British Psychological Society, has an Oeuvre Award from the European Association for Research in Learning and Instruction, and Honorary Doctorates from the universities of Gothenburg and Turku. He has published many articles in academic journals related to both educational psychology and teaching and learning in higher education, as well as several books including Styles of Learning and Teaching (1981), Understanding Student Learning (1983), Understanding Classroom Learning (1987), and Teaching for Understanding at University (2009).

== See also ==
- Ference Marton
