= Ference Marton =

Swedish educational psychologist

Ference Marton (born Ferenc Istvan Marton 7 March 1939) is a Swedish educational psychologist who is best known for introducing the distinction between deep and surface approaches to learning, and developing phenomenography as a methodology for educational research. More recently, he developed a theory of classroom learning based on establishing the prerequisites for learning conceived as the "space of learning". Marton is a professor of education at the University of Gothenburg.

== See also ==
- Noel Entwistle
- Roger Säljö
