= Ellis Batten Page =

Father of automated essay scoring

Ellis Batten "Bo" Page
- Born: April 29, 1924; San Diego, California, U.S.
- Died: May 17, 2005 (aged 81)
- Education: Pomona College, San Diego State University, University of California, Los Angeles
- Known for: Father of automated essay scoring, creator of Project Essay Grade (PEG)
- Scientific career
- Fields: Educational psychology, automated essay scoring
- Workplaces: University of Connecticut, Duke University, Massachusetts Institute of Technology, Harvard University

Ellis Batten “Bo” Page Ed.D. (April 29, 1924 – May 17, 2005) is widely acknowledged as the father of automated essay scoring, a multi-disciplinary field exploring computer evaluation and scoring of student writing, particularly essays. Page's development of and pioneering work with Project Essay Grade (PEG) software in the mid-1960s set the stage for the practical application of computer essay scoring technology following the microcomputer revolution of the 1990s.

== Background ==
Page was born in San Diego, CA. He was a United States Marine Corps veteran, he graduated from Pomona College (Claremont, CA), and he taught high school English while pursuing his master's degree in English at San Diego State University (1955). He received his Ed.D. degree in educational psychology from the University of California, Los Angeles in 1958.

Page served as a professor of education and psychology for several academic institutions before joining the University of Connecticut (Storrs) in 1962 as Professor of Educational Psychology and Director, Bureau of Educational Research. It was during his tenure there (in late 1964) that Page began the development of PEG software, inspired by the convergence of computational linguistics, artificial intelligence technology, and his own experience as a high school English teacher.

== Research ==
Page's research earned him a number of academic appointments including Visiting Scientist at the Massachusetts Institute of Technology (1967–68) and Visiting Professor of Experimental Design at Harvard University (1968–69). Fluent in Spanish, Page also lectured extensively on issues and trends in educational psychology in Spain and South America.

Page published more than 250 research articles, technical reports and papers. He was president of the American Psychological Association’s Division of Educational Psychology (1976–77) and a founding editor of the division's journal, Educational Psychologist. Page also served as president of the American Educational Research Association (1979–80) and contributed to the editorial review boards of several other publications, including the Journal of Educational Measurement of the National Council on Measurement in Education (NCME).

== Products ==
In 1979, Page joined the faculty of Duke University as Professor of Educational Psychology and Research and remained there until 2002. During his tenure, Page renewed his development and research in automated scoring and, in 1993, formed Tru-Judge, Inc., anticipating the potential for commercial applications of the software. In 2002, and in declining health, Page retired from Duke University and sold the intellectual property assets of Tru-Judge to Measurement Incorporated, an educational assessment company specializing in the development and scoring of large-scale assessments.
