= Philip Winne =

Philip H. Winne is a professor of educational psychology and former Canada Research Chair in Self-Regulated Learning and Learning Technologies at Simon Fraser University. A Fellow of the American Educational Research Association, the American Psychological Association, the Association for Psychological Science, and the Canadian Psychological Association, Winne has made significant contributions to research on self-regulated learning. He is the principal investigator of the Learning Kit Project, which has developed educational software, now called nStudy, founded on principles of self-regulated learning.

Before earning a PhD from Stanford University in 1976, Winne received undergraduate and master's degrees from Bucknell University. He has served as President of the Canadian Educational Researchers Association (1984–1986), the Canadian Association for Educational Psychology (1988–1990), and Division 15-Educational Psychology of the American Psychological Association (2001–2003). He co-edited the Educational Psychologist and serves as associate editor of the British Journal of Educational Psychology. Winne has authored (or co-authored) over 100 peer-reviewed journal articles, over 60 book chapters, and 5 books including an introductory textbook on educational psychology that is widely used in Canada (Woolfolk, Winne, & Perry, 2006).
