= Alan Lesgold =

Alan M. Lesgold, an educational psychologist, is professor of psychology and Dean of the University of Pittsburgh School of Education. He received a PhD in psychology from Stanford University, where his doctoral advisor was Gordon Bower (1971) and holds an honorary doctorate from the Open University of the Netherlands. The psychologist has made notable contributions to the cognitive science of learning and its application to instructional technology.

Lesgold received the award for Distinguished Contributions to Applications of Psychology of Education and Training from the American Psychological Association in 2001.

== Select publications ==
- Assessment to Steer the Course of Learning (2008)
- Towards Valued Human Expertise (2007)
- Collaborative Tools in Educational Practice (2007)
- Modeling the Process of Knowledge Sharing (2007)

== See also ==
- Lauren Resnick
