= Richard Shavelson =

American psychologist

Richard J. Shavelson is an American educational psychologist who has published over 100 research articles and books in the fields of educational assessment, psychology, and science education. He is an emeritus professor in the Stanford University Graduate School of Education, a former dean of the Stanford School of Education, and a past president of the American Educational Research Association.

Shavelson earned a Ph.D. in educational psychology from Stanford. Before he joined the Stanford faculty, Shavelson was a professor at UCLA and the University of California, Santa Barbara. He received the E. L. Thorndike Award from the American Psychological Association in 2010; the award recognized his research contributions in educational psychology.

His father was famed screenwriter Mel Shavelson.

Educational offices
Preceded by Lauren Resnick	President of the American Educational Research Association; 1987-1988	Succeeded by Nancy Cole
