= Paul Pintrich =

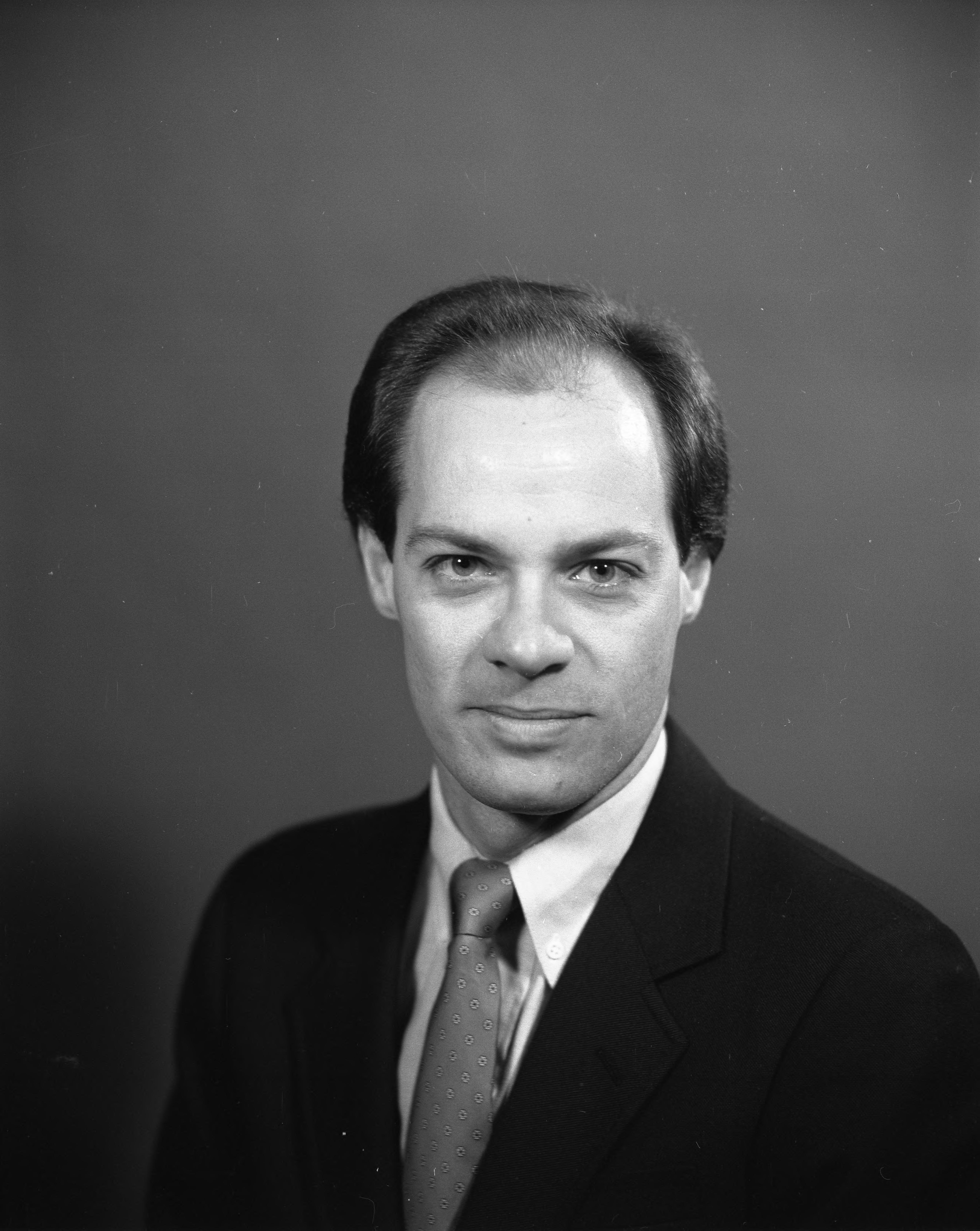
Pintrich, c. 1999

Paul R. Pintrich (1953–2003) was an American educational psychologist who made significant contributions to the fields of motivation, epistemological beliefs, and self-regulated learning. He was a professor of education and psychology at the University of Michigan where he also completed his PhD and MA. Pintrich published over 140 articles, book chapters, and books on topics related to educational psychology.

== Biography ==
Paul Robert Pintrich was born 4 November 1953 in Wilmington, Massachusetts, the only son of five children born to Paul and Teresa Pintrich. On 15 October 1988 he married Elizabeth DeGroot. Pintrich was a prolific author of works on educational psychology.

Pintrich died of a stroke on 12 July 2003 while on a cycling tour.

== Education ==
- Bachelor of Arts degree in psychology, Clark University, Worcester, Massachusetts.
- Master of Arts degree in developmental psychology, University of Michigan, Ann Arbor, Michigan.
- Doctor of Philosophy degree in developmental psychology, University of Michigan, Ann Arbor, Michigan.
