= Educational Psychology Review =

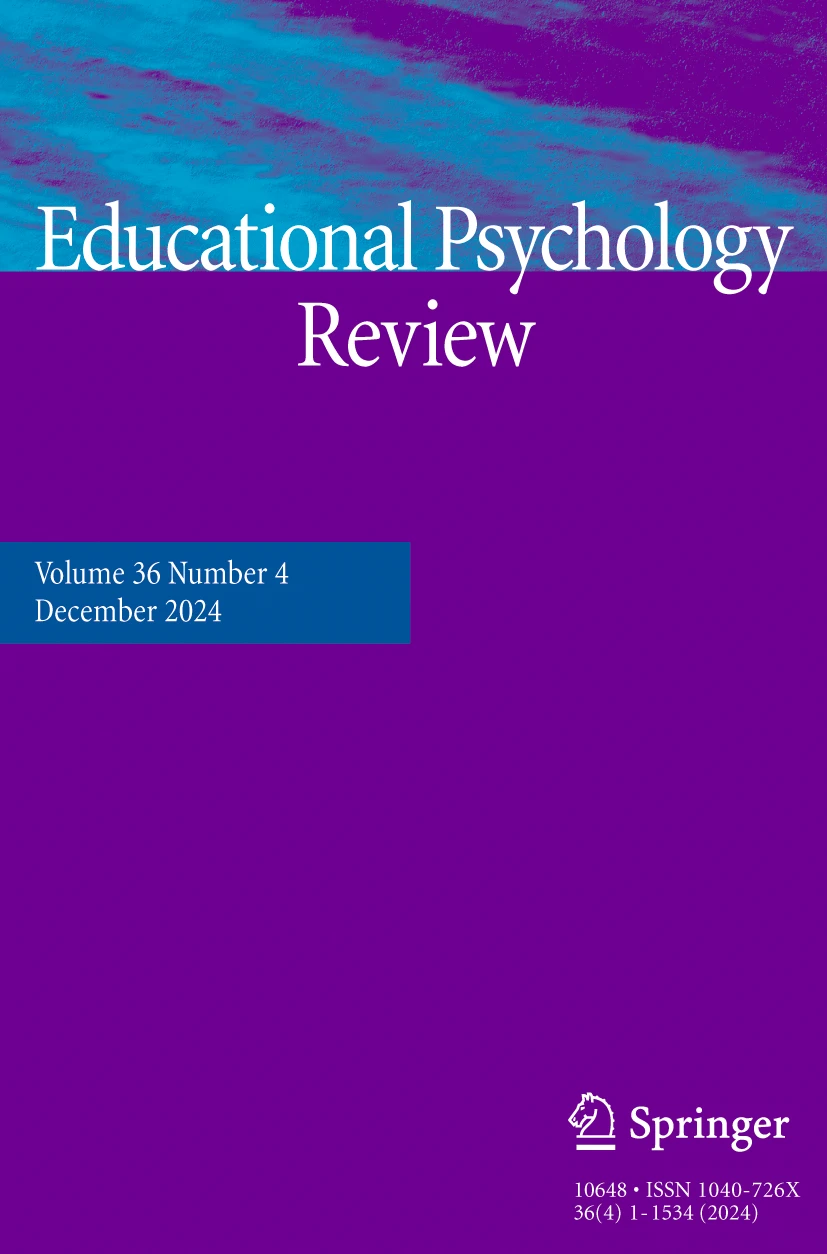
- Discipline: Educational psychology
- Language: English
- Edited by: Fred Paas

Publication details
- History: 1989-present
- Publisher: Springer Nature
- Frequency: Quarterly
- Open access: Hybrid
- Impact factor: 11.9 (2025)

Standard abbreviations
- ISO 4: Educ. Psychol. Rev.

Indexing
- ISSN: 1040-726X (print); 1573-336X (web)
- LCCN: 2004233374
- OCLC no.: 44463440

Links
- Journal homepage; Online access; Online archive

Educational Psychology Review (EDPR) is a quarterly peer-reviewed academic journal covering the field of educational psychology. It was established in 1989 and is published by Springer Nature.

It is a flagship journal in the field of educational psychology.

== Abstracting and indexing ==
The journal is abstracted and indexed in the PsycInfo, PubMed, Eric, Scopus, and Social Sciences Citation Index, among others.

According to the Journal Citation Reports, the journal has a 2025 impact factor of 11.9, with a 5-year impact factor of 16.4.
