= Learning to read =

Acquiring the skills to understand the meaning of written words

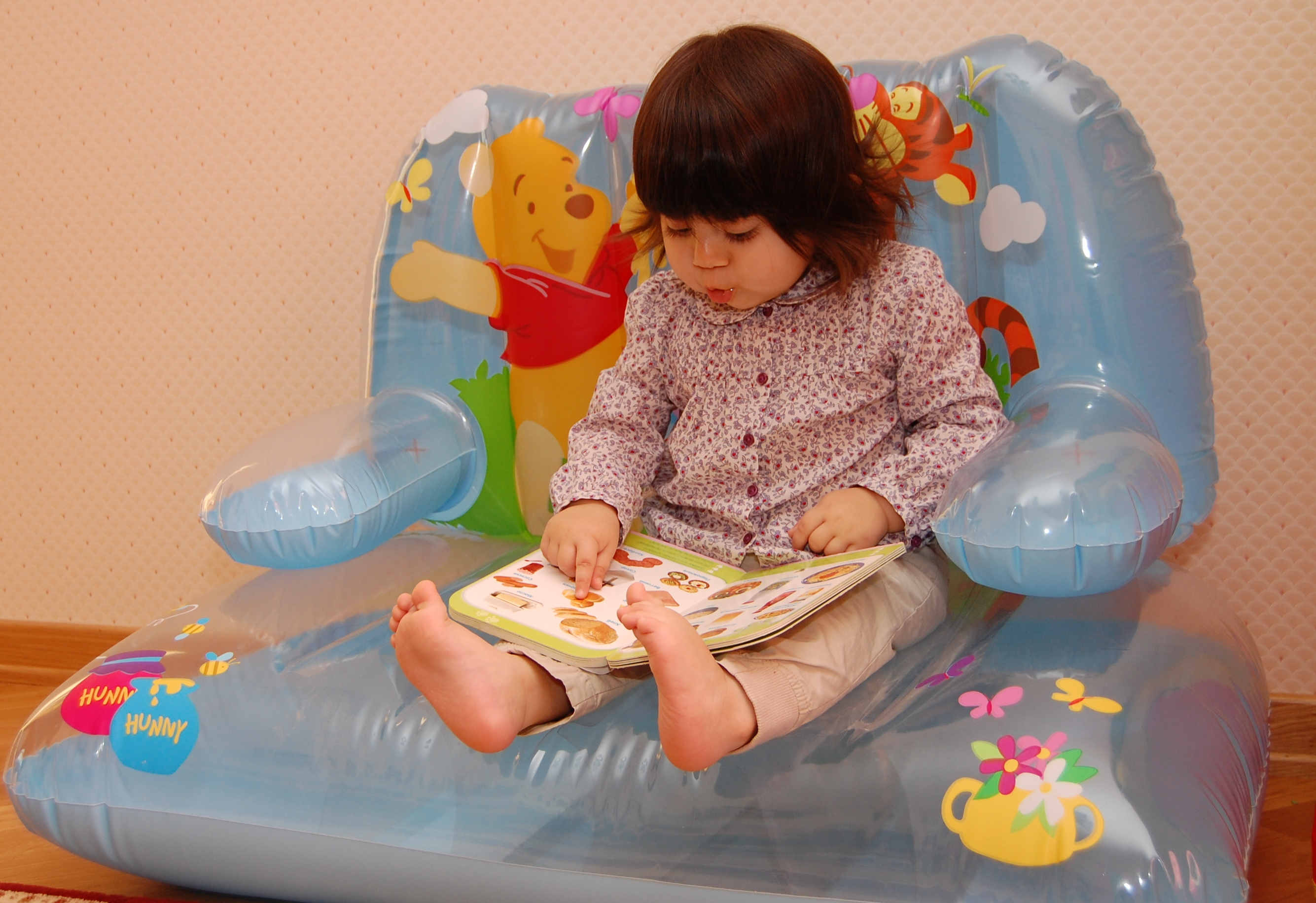
Researchers have concluded that approximately 95% of students can be taught to read by the end of the first or second year of school, yet in many countries 20% or more do not meet that expectation.

Learning to read or reading skills acquisition is the acquisition and practice of the skills necessary to understand the meaning behind printed words. For a skilled reader, the act of reading feels simple, effortless, and automatic. However, the process of learning to read is complex and builds on cognitive, linguistic, and social skills developed from a very early age. As one of the four core language skills (listening, speaking, reading and writing), reading is vital to gaining a command of written language.

== Reading achievement ==
In the United States and elsewhere, it is widely believed that students who lack proficiency in reading by the end of grade three may face obstacles for the rest of their academic career. For example, it is estimated that they would not be able to read half of the material they will encounter in grade four.

In 2019, among American fourth-graders in public schools, only 58% of Asian, 45% of Caucasian, 23% of Hispanic, and 18% of Black students performed at or above the proficient level of the Nation's Report Card. Also, in 2012, in the United Kingdom it has been reported that 15-year-old students are reading at the level expected of 12-year-old students.

As a result, many governments put practices in place to ensure that students are reading at grade level by the end of grade three. An example of this is the Third Grade Reading Guarantee created by the State of Ohio in 2017. This is a program to identify students from kindergarten through grade three that are behind in reading, and provide support to make sure they are on track for reading success by the end of grade three. This is also known as remedial education. Another example is the policy in England whereby any pupil who is struggling to decode words properly by year three must "urgently" receive help through a "rigorous and systematic phonics programme".

In 2016, out of 50 countries, the United States achieved the 15th highest score in grade-four reading ability. The ten countries with the highest overall reading average are the Russian Federation, Singapore, Hong Kong SAR, Ireland, Finland, Poland, Northern Ireland, Norway, Chinese Taipei and England (UK). Some others are: Australia (21st), Canada (23rd), New Zealand (33rd), France (34th), Saudi Arabia (44th), and South Africa (50th).

== Spoken language: the foundation of reading ==
Spoken language is the foundation of learning to read (long before children see any letters) and children's knowledge of the phonological structure of language is a good predictor of early reading ability. Spoken language is dominant for most of childhood; however, reading ultimately catches up and surpasses speech.

By their first birthday, most children have learned all the sounds in their spoken language. However, it takes longer for them to learn the phonological form of words and to begin developing a spoken vocabulary.

Children acquire a spoken language in a few years. Five-to-six-year-old English learners have vocabularies of 2,500 to 5,000 words, and add 5,000 words per year for the first several years of schooling. This rapid learning rate cannot be accounted for by the instruction they receive. Instead, children learn that the meaning of a new word can be inferred because it occurs in the same context as familiar words (e.g., lion is often seen with cowardly and king). As British linguist John Rupert Firth says, "You shall know a word by the company it keeps".

The environment in which children live may also impact their ability to acquire reading skills. Children who are regularly exposed to chronic environmental noise pollution, such as highway traffic noise, have been known to show decreased ability to discriminate between phonemes (oral language sounds) as well as lower reading scores on standardized tests.

== Reading to children: necessary but not sufficient ==
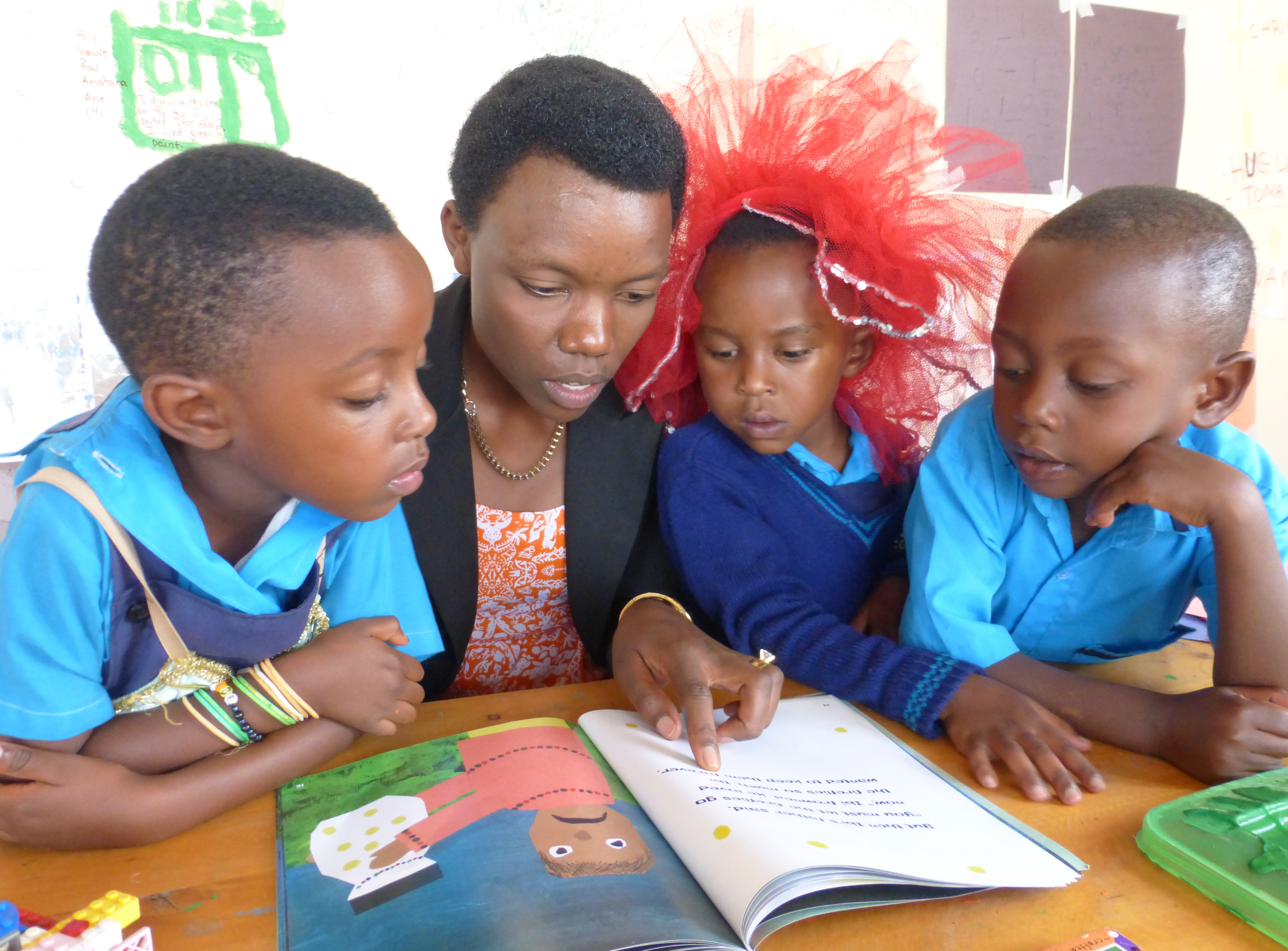
Reading to children is not the same as teaching children to read; however, it does help if the children's attention is directed to the words on the page as they are being read to.

Children learn to speak naturally – by listening to other people speak. However, reading is not a natural process, and many children need to learn to read through a process that involves "systematic guidance and feedback".

So, "reading to children is not the same as teaching children to read". Studies with primary age children indicate that having a child read rather than being read to is the better way to improve reading achievement.

However, there is some evidence that "shared reading" with children does help to improve reading if the children's attention is directed to the words on the page as they are being read to.

Nonetheless, reading to children is important because it socializes them to the activity of reading; it engages them; it expands their knowledge of spoken language; and it enriches their linguistic ability by hearing new and novel words and grammatical structures.

== Optimum age for learning to read ==
There is some debate as to the optimum age to teach children to read.

The Common Core State Standards Initiative (CCSS) in the United States has standards for foundational reading skills in kindergarten and grade one that include instruction in print concepts, phonological awareness, phonics, word recognition, and fluency. However, some critics of CCSS say that "To achieve reading standards usually calls for long hours of drill and worksheets – and reduces other vital areas of learning such as math, science, social studies, art, music and creative play". The PISA 2007 OECD data from 54 countries demonstrates "no association between school entry age ... and reading achievement at age 15". Also, a German study of 50 kindergartens compared children who, at age 5, had spent a year either "academically focused", or "play-arts focused" and found that in time the two groups became inseparable in reading skill. The authors conclude that the effects of early reading are like "watering a garden before a rainstorm; the earlier watering is rendered undetectable by the rainstorm, the watering wastes precious water, and the watering detracts the gardener from other important preparatory groundwork".

Some scholars favor a developmentally appropriate practice (DAP) in which formal instruction on reading begins when children are about six or seven years old. And to support that theory some point out that children in Finland start school at age seven (Finland ranked 5th in the 2016 PIRLS international grade four reading achievement.) In a discussion on academic kindergartens, professor of child development David Elkind has argued that, since "there is no solid research demonstrating that early academic training is superior to (or worse than) the more traditional, hands-on model of early education", educators should defer to developmental approaches that provide young children with ample time and opportunity to explore the natural world on their own terms. Elkind emphasized the principle that "early education must start with the child, not with the subject matter to be taught". In response, Grover J. Whitehurst, Director, Brown Center on Education Policy, (part of Brookings Institution) said David Elkind is relying too much on philosophies of education rather than science and research. He continues to say education practices are "doomed to cycles of fad and fancy" until they become more based on evidence-based practice.

On the subject of Finland's academic results, as some researchers point out, prior to starting school Finnish children must participate in one year of compulsory free pre-primary education and most are reading before they start school. And, with respect to developmentally appropriate practice (DPA), in 2019 the National Association for the Education of Young Children, Washington, D.C., released a draft position paper on DPA saying "The notion that young children are not ready for academic subject matter is a misunderstanding of developmentally appropriate practice; particularly in grades 1 through 3, almost all subject matter can be taught in ways that are meaningful and engaging for each child". And, researchers at The Institutes for the Achievement of Human Potential say it is a myth that early readers are bored or become trouble makers in school.

Other researchers and educators favor limited amounts of literacy instruction at the age of four and five, in addition to non-academic, intellectually stimulating activities.

Reviews of the academic literature by the Education Endowment Foundation in the UK have found that starting literacy teaching in preschool has "been consistently found to have a positive effect on early learning outcomes" and that "beginning early years education at a younger age appears to have a high positive impact on learning outcomes". This supports current standard practice in the UK which includes developing children's phonemic awareness in preschool and teaching reading from age four.

A study in Chicago reports that an early education program for children from low-income families is estimated to generate $4 to $11 of economic benefits over a child's lifetime for every dollar spent initially on the program, according to a cost-benefit analysis funded by the National Institutes of Health. The program is staffed by certified teachers and offers "instruction in reading and math, group activities and educational field trips for children ages 3 through 9".

There does not appear to be any definitive research about the "magic window" to begin reading instruction. However, there is also no definitive research to suggest that starting early causes any harm. Researcher and educator Timothy Shanahan, suggests, "Start teaching reading from the time you have kids available to teach, and pay attention to how they respond to this instruction – both in terms of how well they are learning what you are teaching, and how happy and invested they seem to be. If you haven't started yet, don't feel guilty, just get going".

=== Suggested reading instruction by grade level ===
Some education researchers suggest the teaching of the various reading components by specific grade levels. The following is one example from Carol Tolman, Ed.D. and Louisa Moats, Ed.D. that corresponds in many respects with the United States Common Core State Standards Initiative:

Reading instruction component	Tolman & Moats	US Common Core
Phonological awareness	K–1	K–1
Basic phonics	K–1	K–1
Vocabulary	K–6+	K–6+
Comprehension	K–6+	K–6+
Written expression	1–6+	K–6+
Fluency	1–3	1–5
Advanced phonics/decoding	2–6+	2–5

=== Foundational reading skill instruction practices, kindergarten through grade 12 ===
The percentage of US students who failed to perform at or above the Nations Report Card basic reading level were grade 4 (37% in 2022), grade 8 (30% in 2022), and grade 12 (30% in 2019). As a result, many secondary school teachers devote some class time to activities related to foundational reading skills.

The following chart shows the percentage of K-12 English Language Arts teachers that engaged in foundational reading activities with students (i.e., engaging every student in a class in activities related to the foundational reading skills for more than a few minutes within the past five class lessons).

Activities / Grades	K–1	2–5	6–8	9–12
Print concepts	73%	56%	35%	40%
Phonological awareness	85%	59%	29%	22%
Phonics	92%	61%	25%	22%
Fluency	80%	65%	36%	36%

Secondary ELA teachers in states with reading legislation were significantly more likely to report frequently engaging their students in these activities than secondary ELA teachers in states without such legislation, even though only one-quarter of states with these laws include requirements around secondary ELA instruction.

== Stages to skilled reading ==
The path to skilled reading involves learning the alphabetic principle, phonemic awareness, phonics, fluency, vocabulary and comprehension.

British psychologist Uta Frith introduced a three-stage model to acquire skilled reading. Stage one is the logographic or pictorial stage where students attempt to grasp words as objects, an artificial form of reading. Stage two is the phonological stage where students learn the relationship between the graphemes (letters) and the phonemes (sounds). Stage three is the orthographic stage where students read familiar words more quickly than unfamiliar words, and word length gradually ceases to play a role.

Another recognized expert in this area is Harvard professor Jeanne Sternlicht Chall. In 1983 she published a book entitled Stages of Reading Development that proposed six stages.

Subsequently, in 2008 Maryanne Wolf, UCLA Graduate School of Education and Information Studies, published a book entitled Proust and the Squid in which she describes her view of the following five stages of reading development. Normally, children will move through these stages at different rates; however, typical ages for children in the United States are shown below.

=== Emerging pre-reader: 6 months to 6 years old ===
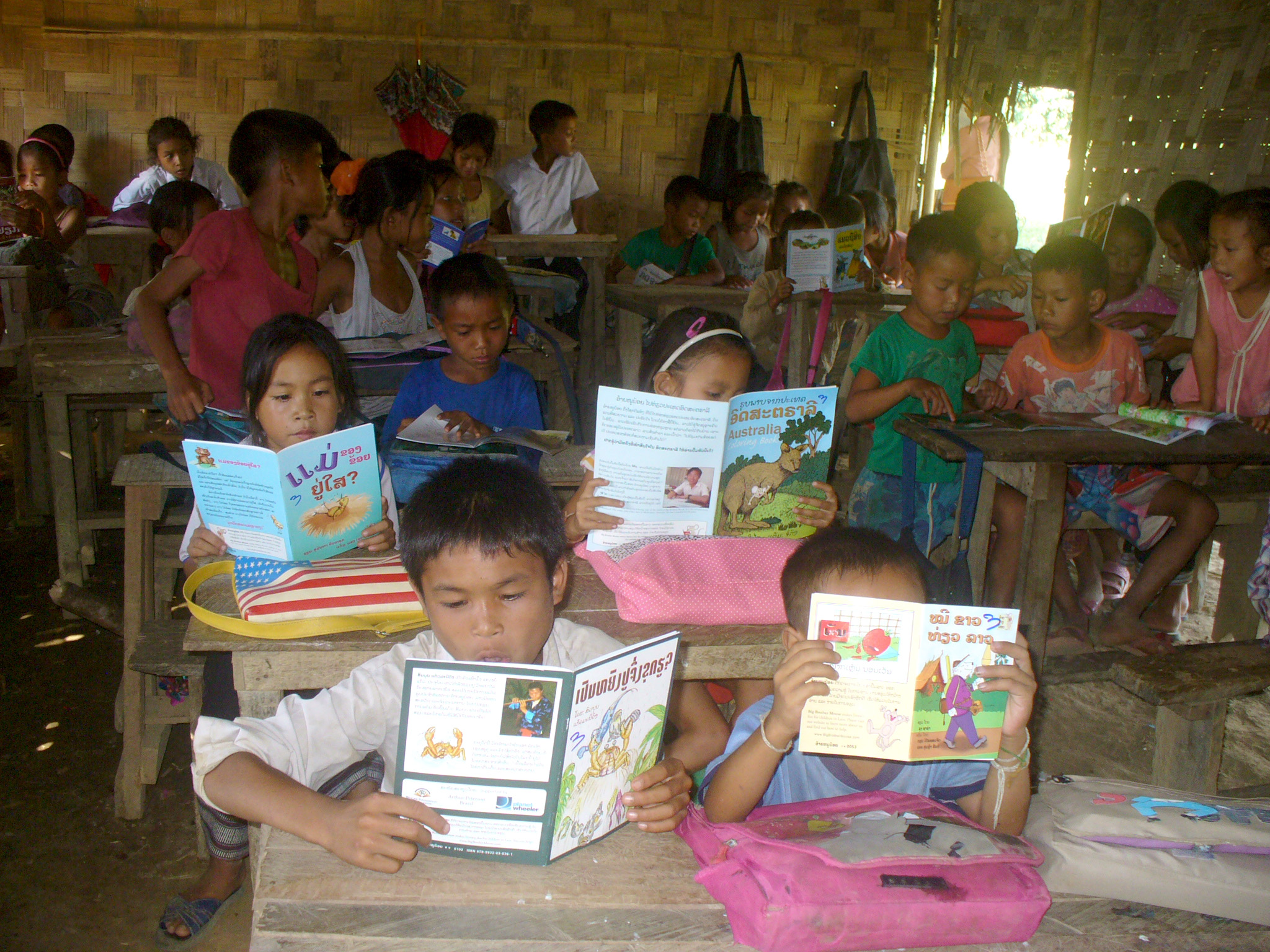
Reading time at a primary school in rural Lao PDR, Southeast Asia. In 2017, approximately 70% of five-year-old children were not enrolled in Early Childhood Education programs, with those in hard-to-reach areas and from poor families being the most excluded. The daily reading period shown here uses books provided by Big Brother Mouse, a not-for-profit that promotes reading in Lao schools and villages.

The emerging pre-reader stage, also known as reading readiness, usually lasts for the first five years of a child's life. Children typically speak their first few words before their first birthday. Educators and parents help learners to develop their skills in listening, speaking, reading and writing.

Reading to children helps them to develop their vocabulary, a love of reading, and phonemic awareness, i.e. the ability to hear and manipulate the individual sounds (phonemes) of oral language. Children will often "read" stories they have memorized. However, in the late 1990s, United States' researchers found that the traditional way of reading to children made little difference in their later ability to read because children spend relatively little time actually looking at the text. Yet, in a shared reading program with four-year-old children, teachers found that directing children's attention to the letters and words (e.g. verbally or pointing to the words) made a significant difference in early reading, spelling and comprehension.

=== Novice reader: 6 to 7 years old ===
Novice readers continue to develop their phonemic awareness, and come to realize that the letters (graphemes) connect to the sounds (phonemes) of the language; known as decoding, phonics, and the alphabetic principle. They may also memorize the most common letter patterns and some of the high-frequency words that do not necessarily follow basic phonological rules (e.g. have and who). However, it is a mistake to assume a reader understands the meaning of a text merely because they can decode it. Vocabulary and oral language comprehension are also important parts of text comprehension as described in the Simple view of reading, Scarborough's reading rope, and The active view of reading model. Reading and speech are codependent: reading promotes vocabulary development and a richer vocabulary facilitates skilled reading.

=== Decoding reader: 7 to 9 years old ===
The transition from the novice reader stage to the decoding stage is marked by a reduction of painful pronunciations and in its place the sounds of a smoother, more confident reader. In this phase the reader adds at least 3,000 words to what they can decode. For example, in the English language, readers now learn the variations of the vowel-based rimes (e.g. sat, mat, cat) and vowel pairs (also digraph) (e.g. rain, play, boat)

As readers move forward, they learn the makeup of morphemes (i.e. stems, roots, prefixes and suffixes). They learn the common morphemes such as "s" and "ed" and see them as "sight chunks". "The faster a child can see that beheaded is be + head + ed", the faster they will become a more fluent reader.

At the beginning of this stage, a child will often be devoting so much mental capacity to the process of decoding that they will have no understanding of the words being read. It is nevertheless an important stage, allowing the child to achieve their ultimate goal of becoming fluent and automatic.

It is in the decoding phase that the child will get to what the story is really about, and learn to re-read a passage when necessary to truly understand it.

=== Fluent, comprehending reader: 9 to 15 years old ===
The goal of this stage is to "go below the surface of the text", and in the process the reader will build their knowledge of spelling substantially.

Teachers and parents may be tricked by fluent-sounding reading into thinking that a child understands everything that they are reading. As the content of what they can read becomes more demanding, good readers will develop knowledge of figurative language and irony which helps them to discover new meanings in the text.

Children improve their comprehension when they use a variety of tools such as connecting prior knowledge, predicting outcomes, drawing inferences, and monitoring gaps in their understanding. One of the most powerful moments is when fluent comprehending readers learn to enter into the lives of imagined heroes and heroines.

When teaching comprehension, the educational psychologist, G. Michael Pressley, says a strong case can be made for instruction in decoding, vocabulary, word knowledge, active comprehension strategies, and self-monitoring.

At the end of this stage, many processes are starting to become automatic, allowing the reader to focus on meaning. With the decoding process almost automatic by this point, the brain learns to integrate more metaphorical, inferential, analogical, background, and experiential knowledge. This stage in learning to read will often last until early adulthood.

=== Expert reader: 16 years and older ===
At the expert stage, it will usually only take a reader one-half second to read almost any word. The degree to which expert reading will change throughout an adult's life depends on what they read and how much they read.

== See also ==
- Language acquisition
