= Patricia Alexander =

Educational psychologist

Patricia A. Alexander
- Education: University of Maryland
- Occupation: Educational psychologist Distinguished University Professor Jean Mullen Professor of Literacy
- Website: https://www.drlrl.org/

Patricia A. Alexander is an educational psychologist who has conducted research on the role of individual difference, strategic processing, and interest in students' learning. She is currently a university distinguished professor, Jean Mullan Professor of Literacy, and Distinguished Scholar/Teacher in the Department of Human Development and Quantitative Methodology in the College of Education at the University of Maryland and a visiting professor at the University of Auckland, New Zealand.

Alexander has been a featured speaker at major research conferences, including the annual meetings of the National Reading Conference, the American Psychological Association, and the American Educational Research Association. She has authored an educational psychology textbook, and has served as editor of prominent research journals and books in educational psychology.

At the University of Maryland, Alexander supervises the Disciplined Reading and Learning Research Lab (DRLRL), dedicated to the study of psychology in teaching and learning. The research of the DRLRL includes the study of academic development, reading and multiple source use, domain learning, relational reasoning, and the role of individual differences in academic performance. The lab is an evolving learning environment that allows students to exchange ideas and conduct original empirical research. Alexander has received national and university-level honors for her mentoring, teaching and research.

== Academic career ==
Recently named one of the most influential and productive educational psychologists of the past decade, Alexander has served as President of Division 15 (Educational Psychology) of the American Psychological Association, Vice-President of Division C (Learning and Instruction) of the American Educational Research Association, and President of the Southwest Educational Research Association. Since receiving her Ph.D., Alexander has published over 280 articles, books, or chapters in the area of learning and instruction. She has presented over 400 invited addresses or papers at national and international conferences.

Alexander currently serves as the senior editor of Contemporary Educational Psychology and is a former editor of Instructional Science and the American Educational Research Journal. She presently serves on over 10 editorial boards including Learning and Instruction, Educational Psychologist, and the Journal of Educational Psychology. She has received numerous awards, including the Thorndike and Scribner Awards (See Awards and Achievements). In addition to these scholarly contributions to the field, Dr. Alexander serves as an international educational consultant in Europe, New Zealand, and Israel.

=== Model of Domain Learning ===
Perhaps Alexander's most notable contribution to the educational psychology literature is her Model of Domain Learning. In contrast to traditional models of expertise, the MDL provides an alternative lens on development in academic domains. The MDL is a three-stage model, with each phase characterized by particular configurations of knowledge, interest, and strategic processing.

The first stage, acclimation, exemplifies learners with limited domain and topic knowledge, where domain knowledge refers to the breadth of knowledge within a field and topic knowledge to the depth of knowledge about particular topics within that field. Alexander's work has demonstrated that the lack knowledge and experience with the domain during this phase co occurs with limited individual interest—or, preexisting interest—in the domain; rather, situational interest, or, interest sparked by the environment, may be particularly influential. As a result of this dearth of knowledge and interest, acclimating learners lack the strategic processing skills needed to master the content.

Alexander characterizes the second stage, competence, as including an increase in both domain and topic knowledge. Because of this broader and deeper body of knowledge, learners are able to apply a mixture of surface-level and deep processing strategies. Such shifts in knowledge and strategic processing are further associated with increases in individual interest, as learners no longer need to rely on situational features of the environment to draw their attention. The third stage, proficiency, is marked by an even broader and deeper knowledge base, as well as high individual interest. More importantly, these learners use their deep processing strategies to push the field forward with probing questions and novel ideas. Alexander (1997b) maintains that few ever reach this stage.

The MDL draws its strength from several facets that place the model in contrast with traditional models of expertise. First, whereas other models examine expertise as it manifests in particular activities (e.g., dance, medical diagnosis), the MDL centers on development in academic domains. This focus helps guide practitioners' approaches to teaching and allows them to better understand their students. In addition, this model takes into account affective factors (i.e., interest, motivation) that are often ignored in traditional models of expertise. Alexander's early writing on the integration of knowledge and strategic process resulted in a highly cited article published in 1988 with Judith Judy in Review of Educational Research.

=== Reading development ===
Alexander is a leader in students' reading and literacy development throughout the lifespan and in connection to prior knowledge and domain learning. She has characterized reading as multidimensional, developmental, goal directed, and intentional. Alexander and colleagues have introduced a conceptual framework for prior knowledge including conceptual knowledge, metacognitive knowledge, and knowledge construction interacting with one another, within a broader context of sociocultural knowledge and tacit knowledge. See Figure 2 JSTOR 1170635.

Beyond prior knowledge, Alexander has considered the cognitive processes, including strategy selection and use and metacognition, and motivational experiences, specifically interest and goal-directedness, involved in reading. More recently, in a 2010 report commissioned by the National Academic of Sciences, Alexander defined competent reading in the 21st century. Alexander critiqued findings from the 1997 National Reading Panel that focused on reading acquisition, including phonemic awareness and vocabulary development. Alexander has criticized the overemphasis on learning to read, found in much of the reading literature targeting younger grades, and has advocated for greater attention paid to reading to learn, regarded as for mature reading. She serves as a reading consultant for the National Assessment of Educational Progress.

More recently, Alexander's work has turned to examining reading in information-saturated, digital contexts. To understand students' text processing in these environments, Alexander has drawn the distinction between information management and knowledge building. While information management is characterized by surface-level processing, focusing on reducing information volume to identify an answer, knowledge building involves deeper processing and in an effort to identify patterns and build understanding. She has called for teachers to develop tasks and learning environments that support students' engagement in knowledge building rather than information management.

=== Teacher and student beliefs ===
In her approach to studying the beliefs of students and teachers, Alexander sought to broaden the perspective of epistemic beliefs typically examined within educational research. Research on epistemic beliefs, stemming from work by William G. Perry on Harvard undergraduates in the 1970s have focused on beliefs about the nature of knowledge. Initially, Alexander's research into the study of beliefs focused on the degree to which students and teachers identified with the Platonic view of knowledge as justified true beliefs. In doing so, she examined the degree to which students and experts regarded "knowledge" and "belief" to be overlapping concepts. Responding to the challenging task of self-reporting one's own beliefs, this work by Alexander and colleagues developed innovative measurement techniques that included graphical depictions of the constructs.

Alexander, through her years of teaching experience, noticed that students, particularly those in the [digital age] were more concerned with managing information needed for tests than building knowledge. Building on these observations Alexander and her colleagues studied students beliefs about knowledge, information, and truth in students from elementary to college. Her work on beliefs addresses changes in beliefs across academic development, and has spanned the United States, Israel, Singapore, the Netherlands, and Italy.

=== Relational reasoning ===
One of Alexander's current lines of research delves into relational reasoning strategies, which include metacognitive strategies that help individuals transfer knowledge across texts, tasks, and domains. Relational reasoning strategies are defined as, "cognitive procedures purposefully applied to recognizing or deriving meaningful relations or patterns between and among pieces of information that would otherwise appear unrelated." Even though there are many forms of relational reasoning, Alexander and colleagues have proposed that analogy (similarity), anomaly (discrepancy), antinomy (incompatibility), and antithesis (opposition) are four manifestations of relational reasoning of importance for academic learning and development. Of the four proposed manifestations of relational reasoning, analogy and anomaly have been widely studied, while antinomy and antithesis are not as well-established.

Analogy involves recognizing relational similarities between two seemingly disparate ideas, objects, or events. Anomaly is defined as any occurrence or object that is unusual or unique, and deviates from an established rule of trend. Antinomy refers to identifying principles or statements that are contradictory, and antithesis occurs when two propositions, principles, or explanations are set in direct contrast or opposition.

In 2014, Alexander and the Disciplined Reading and Learning Research Laboratory published the Test of Relational Reasoning (TORR), which includes the four identified manifestations of relations described. In an effort to be culturally unbiased, the assessment contains visual representations of relations, which alleviate the demands of language and content knowledge. As of 2014, Alexander and the DRLRL had developed a linguistic counterpart to the TORR, the verbal Test of Relational Reasoning (vTORR), and testing of a version of the original TORR for elementary students, called the TORR Junior is currently underway.

== Awards and achievements ==
Alexander's was recently named a Distinguished University Professor at the University of Maryland, College Park. Her honors also include the Oscar S. Causey Award for outstanding contributions to literacy research from the National Reading Conference (2001), the E. L. Thorndike Award for Career Achievement in Educational Psychology from APA Division 15 (2006), and the Sylvia Scribner Career Award from AERA Division C (2007). She has also received university-level honors for her teaching, mentorship, and research, including the University of Maryland System Regents Faculty Award for Mentoring.

== See also ==
- Reading motivation
- Karen R. Harris

== Representative publications ==
- Alexander, P. A. (2000). Toward a model of academic development: Schooling and the acquisition of knowledge: The sequel. Educational Researcher.
- Alexander, P. A., & Winne, P. H. (Eds.) (2006). Handbook of educational psychology. Mahwah, NJ: Lawrence Erlbaum Associates.
- Alexander, P. A. (2005). Psychology in Learning and Instruction (Educational Psychology). Prentice Hall.
- Alexander, P. A. (1998). The nature of disciplinary and domain learning: The knowledge, interest, and strategic dimensions of learning from subject-matter text. In C. Hynd (Ed.), Learning from text across conceptual domains (pp. 263–287). Mahwah, NJ: Lawrence Erlbaum Associates.
