= Rothkopf =

Rothkopf is a surname. Notable people with the surname include:

- David Rothkopf (born 1955), American political scientist
- Ernst Rothkopf (1925–2012), Austrian-born American educational psychologist
- Louis Rothkopf (1903–1956), American businessman
- Scott Rothkopf, American art curator
