= Steve Rizzo =

Comedian turned Motivational Speaker

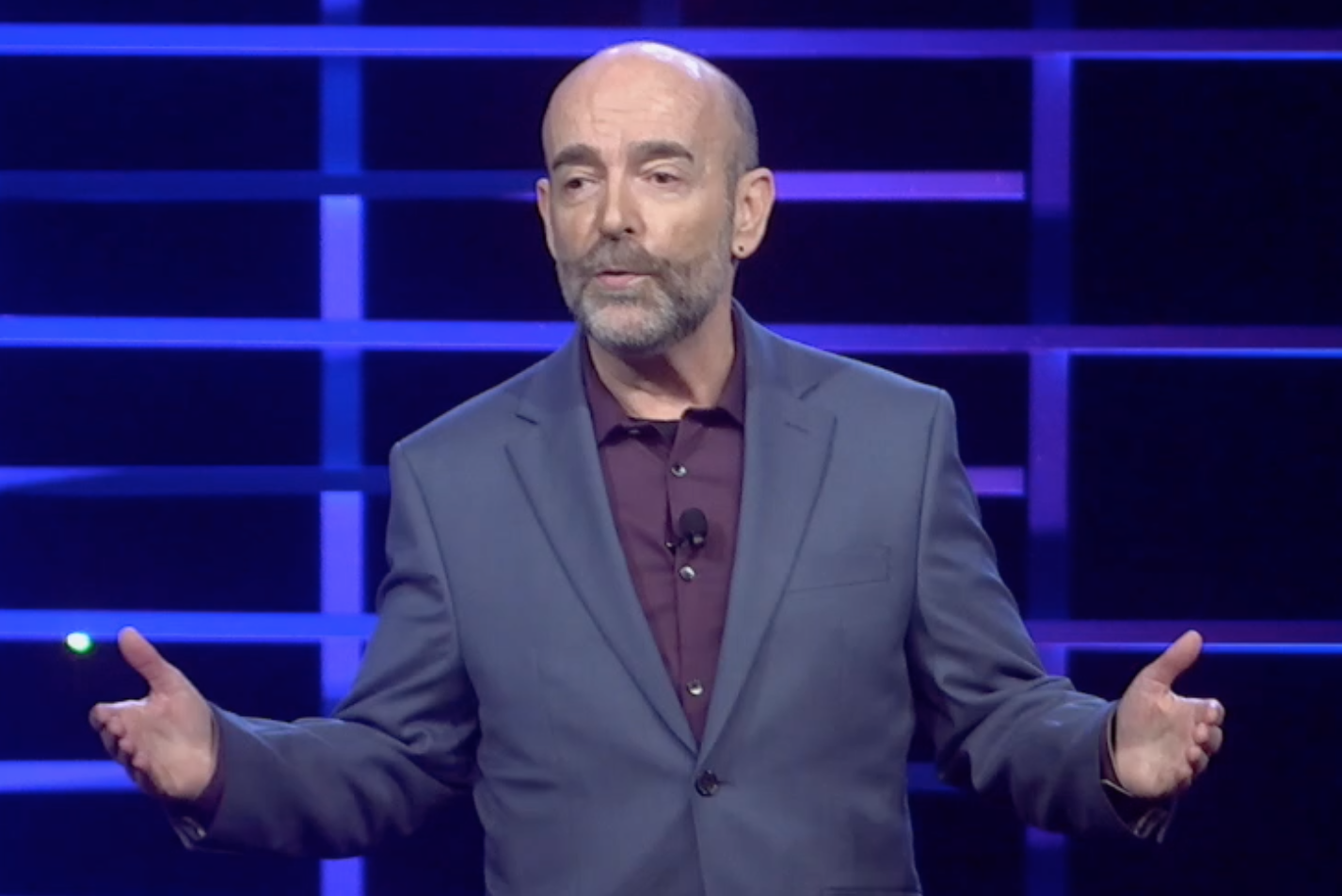
- Steve Rizzo in 2019
- Education: Long Island University; C. W. Post Campus
- Occupation: Motivational Speaker
- Organization(s): Laugh it off Productions, Rizz's Biz
- Known for: Motivational Speaking, Motivational Writing
- Notable work: Get Your Shift Together, Becoming A Humor Being
- Style: Humorous
- Awards: CPAE Speaker Hall of Fame
- Website: www.SteveRizzo.com

Steve Rizzo is an American motivational speaker, author, and former stand-up comedian, who is notable for his humorous style of motivational speaking and writing. Rizzo is a member of the National Speakers Association (NSA) and an inductee of the Council of Peers Award for Excellence (CPAE) Speaker Hall of Fame. His book, Becoming a Humor Being: The Power to Choose a Better Way won the Writer's Digest International Self-Published Book Awards.

== Background ==
Steve Rizzo is a native of Brooklyn in New York City. While growing up, "Rizzo was [once] told by a [high school] guidance counselor that he didn't have the intelligence for college." He went on to study at the Long Island University C. W. Post Campus, earning a Bachelor of Arts in English and Education (with Honors) and Master of Arts in Theater Arts.

== Career ==
Rizzo was once an English teacher for the 7th and 8th grade students at West Babylon Junior High School in West Babylon, New York, and counselor to students with behavioral problems in the 9th to 12th grades. He later became a comedian, and was roommate to Drew Carey, had Dennis Miller and Rosie O'Donnell open shows for him and shared the stage with Eddie Murphy, Rodney Dangerfield, Jerry Seinfeld and Ellen DeGeneres before moving on to become a motivational speaker. Rizzo left a promising career of over 18 years in stand-up comedy to pursue a new career in motivational speaking; he became a professional speaker in 1994.

As a stand-up comic, Rizzo performed at various comedy clubs, including the Pittsburgh Comedy Club in Dormont and the Improv. He also was featured in many television comedy shows, including An Evening at the Improv, Showtime Special, The Comedy Channel and Fox TV's Comic Strip Live. In The Pittsburgh Press of June 2, 1983, Lenny Litman described Rizzo's comedy style as "whip-cracking satire cushioned with warm and funny stories."

While Rizzo was transitioning from being a stand-up comedian to a motivational speaker, after one of his shows at a New Jersey comedy club, he met Al Parinello, president of the National Speakers Association (NSA)—New Jersey chapter, he encouraged Rizzo to attend a workshop of the National Speakers Association. After the workshop, Rizzo was asked to present How to Add Humor to Your Presentations at a national convention of the National Speakers Association. At this transitioning period, Rizzo also met Nancy Lauterbach, the founder of Five Star Speakers and Trainers after a show in Orlando, Florida, and according to Kelli Vrla in Speaker (a publication of National Speakers Association) of September 2010, "she took him under her wing and helped him structure his presentation. In his first showcase, Rizzo ranked dead last out of 23 speakers because he tried to sound like a "serious motivational speaker." He soon realized his humor was the key to his authenticity. "I was light years ahead of many professional speakers because I had command of an audience," Rizzo says. When Rizzo incorporated humor in his next showcase, buyers immediately hired him. He signed an exclusive agreement with Five Star, and his speaking business took off. Rizzo credits Lauterbach with helping him establish a foothold in his new career."

Rizzo had a PBS Special which he created by himself, and he was also the executive producer. In an article published on December 08, 2006 by Oprah Radio (via Oprah.com), Mehmet Oz wrote that "Steve Rizzo is the author of Becoming a Humor Being, and the creator and executive producer of his own nationally syndicated PBS special. After doing stand-up comedy for many years, Steve transitioned to being a professional humorist speaker." A publication by McGraw-Hill (introducing Rizzo's book, Get Your SHIFT Together: How to Think, Laugh, and Enjoy Your Way to Success in Business and in Life) says, "[Rizzo reaches] well over 50,000 people a year through his talks and weekly Rizzo-Gram e-mails."

== Affiliations ==
Rizzo was featured on MSNBC and Oprah and Friends radio network as a consultant. In the introduction of Rizzo's book, Get Your SHIFT Together: How to Think, Laugh, and Enjoy Your Way to Success in Business and in Life, published on the website of McGraw-Hill, Rizzo is described as "The Attitude Adjuster, is a personal development expert whose clients include American Airlines, BP, JPMorgan Chase, Scholastic, and Sprint, among others. As a standup comic, he has headlined with many titans of comedy, including Jerry Seinfeld, Eddie Murphy, Drew Carey, and Ellen DeGeneres."

At a National Association of Trailer Manufacturers (NATM)'s event in 2002, Rizzo was a keynote speaker. While addressing the members of the association on How to be a Humor Being, he described himself as a Professional Humor Being (PhB). Rizzo was also a speaker at ISPA EXPO 2006, where he "kept his [International Sleep Products Association] audience laughing while they learned how to deal with every-day stressors and embrace change in their lives during the ISPA Industry Breakfast." At the Community Leaders Breakfast at the Decatur Confenrence Center and Hotel in Decatur, Illinois in 2008, "Rizzo spoke of the benefits of unleashing your "humor being" as a way to bring out the best in yourself during trying times." Rizzo was also a speaker at Surf Summit 13, an event organized jointly by the Surf Industry Manufacturers Association (SIMA) and the Board Retailers Association (BRA), which was held in Los Cabos, Mexico in 2010; he made a presentation on The Atti-Tools for Success.

== Publications ==
Rizzo has written some notable inspirational books, including:

- Steve Rizzo (2005). Becoming a Humor Being: The Power to Choose a Better Way. Full Circle Publishing. 177 pages. ISBN 9780966989519.
- Steve Rizzo (2013). Get Your SHIFT Together: How to Think, Laugh, and Enjoy Your Way to Success in Business and in Life. with a foreword by Jeffrey Gitomer (1st ed.). McGraw Hill. 224 Pages. ISBN 9780071807739.

In the description of Rizzo's book, Get Your SHIFT Together: How to Think, Laugh, and Enjoy Your Way to Success in Business and in Life, published on the website of McGraw-Hill, Mehmet Oz is quoted to have said that "Through shifting your focus and way of thinking, Steve Rizzo shows how to succeed on all levels of life, while actually enjoying the process. What could be better?! You will love the truth, the humor, and the wisdom this book contains."

== See also ==
- Motivation
- Public speaking
- Reading motivation
