= E. L. Thorndike Award =

Educational-psychology award

The APA Division 15 Career Achievement Award (previously the E. L. Thorndike Career Achievement Award) is an award of the American Psychological Association given to living recipients for substantial career achievements in educational psychology. The award's winners are recognized for research in the best tradition of educational psychology, meaning that the award is conferred for original, scientific, empirically based research that contributes significantly to knowledge, theory, or practice in educational psychology. It was named for the noted psychologist Edward Thorndike but later renamed following revelations which tied Thorndike to eugenics.

== Recipients ==
Source: America Psychological Association and APA Division 15

- 2024 Dale Schunk
- 2023 Phil Winne
- 2022 Karen Harris
- 2021 Daniel L. Schwartz
- 2020 Thomas L. Good
- 2019 Steve Graham
- 2018 Joanna P. Williams
- 2017 Robert Slavin
- 2016 Edward Haertel
- 2015 Michelene Chi
- 2014 Stephen J. Ceci
- 2013 Sandra Graham
- 2012 Keith Stanovich
- 2011 Barry Zimmerman
- 2010 Richard Shavelson
- 2009 Carol Dweck
- 2008 Bernard Weiner
- 2007 Jere Brophy
- 2006 Patricia Alexander
- 2005 Jacquelynne S. Eccles
- 2004 G. Michael Pressley
- 2003 Robert J. Sternberg
- 2002 Joel Levin
- 2001 John Bransford
- 2000 Richard E. Mayer
- 1999 Albert Bandura
- 1998 Lauren Resnick
- 1997 Richard C. Anderson
- 1996 David Berliner
- 1995 Lee Shulman
- 1994 James Greeno
- 1993 Samuel Messick
- 1992 Robert Linn
- 1991 Herbert Klausmeier
- 1990 Richard E. Snow
- 1989 Frank Farley
- 1988 Wilbert J. McKeachie
- 1987 Merlin Wittrock
- 1986 Nathaniel Gage
- 1985 Ernst Rothkopf
- 1984 Anne Anastasi
- 1983 Jeanne Chall
- 1982 Robert Glaser
- 1981 Jerome Bruner
- 1980 Richard C. Atkinson
- 1979 Patrick Suppes
- 1978 Julian Stanley
- 1977 David Ausubel
- 1976 Jean Piaget
- 1975 Joy P. Guilford
- 1974 Robert M. Gagne
- 1973 Benjamin S. Bloom
- 1972 John C. Flanagan
- 1971 Robert L. Thorndike
- 1970 John B. Carroll
- 1969 Robert J. Havighurst
- 1968 Cyril Burt
- 1967 Lee Cronbach
- 1966 Burrhus F. Skinner
- 1965 William A. Brownell
- 1964 Sidney L. Pressey

== See also ==
- Spearman Medal
- Bruno Klopfer Award
- List of psychology awards
- List of awards named after people
