= Joel Levin =

American psychologist

Joel Levin is an American psychologist. He received the E. L. Thorndike Award in 2002.
