= Barry Zimmerman =

American educational psychologist (1942–2025)

Barry Joseph Zimmerman (November 23, 1942 – February 17, 2025) was an American educational researcher at the City University of New York, where he held the title Distinguished Professor of Educational Psychology. He has written scholarly publications on learning and motivation, many describing his research and theories on self-regulated learning. In 2011, Zimmerman was awarded the E.L. Thorndike Career Achievement award by the American Psychological Association's Division of Educational Psychology.

== Personal life ==
He was born to Victor and Ida Mae (DeKeyser) Zimmerman and raised in Ripon, Wisconsin and earned his Bachelor's degree and Ph.D. in Educational Psychology from the University of Arizona. Zimmerman married Diana Conley; the couple had two daughters. Zimmerman died on February 17, 2025, at age 82.

In 1997, Zimmerman's daughter Kristin Louise married Alexander Scott, a British mathematician.

== See also ==
- Albert Bandura
