= Frank H. Farley =

Canadian-American psychologist

- Born: Edmonton, Alberta
- Education: University of Saskatchewan; University of London (Ph.D.)
- Known for: APA president, 1993
- Awards: E. L. Thorndike Award (1989)
- Scientific career
- Fields: Educational psychology
- Workplaces: University of Wisconsin–Madison; Temple University
- Doctoral advisor: Hans Eysenck

Frank H. Farley was a humanistic psychologist and a past president of the American Psychological Association (APA) and the American Educational Research Association (AERA). He taught at Temple University and was a fellow or a leader of several scholarly societies. He published research on a wide range of topics, from risk-taking personalities to men who visit massage parlors. Farley died on March 20th, 2026.

== Career ==
Farley was born in Edmonton, Alberta. He said that when he was eight years old, he tried to assist an elderly neighbor who was having a heart attack. Some of his friends froze in the moment. The man died, but the experience later sparked a scientific interest in the psychology of heroic actions. He earned an undergraduate degree and a master's degree from the University of Saskatchewan and a PhD from the University of London. Between 1966 and 1995, Farley taught at the University of Wisconsin–Madison. He is the Laura H. Carnell Professor of Educational Psychology at Temple University.

Farley was the president of the AERA in 1980–1981. He was on the board of directors for the International Society for the Study of Individual Differences (ISSID) between 1983 and 1991. He served as APA president in 1993. For the period of 2014–2016, Farley represents Division 32 (Society for Humanistic Psychology) on the APA Council of Representatives. He was elected president of the Society for the Study of Peace, Conflict and Violence for a term beginning in August 2015. A founding officer of the Federation of Associations in Behavioral and Brain Sciences, he has held several positions on the board of that organization.

Farley formulated the concept of the Type T (thrill-seeking) personality. He theorizes that Type T personalities require an increased level of stimulation to maintain their energy levels. In a 2011 Los Angeles Times opinion piece, Farley discussed infidelity among politicians, pointing out that the risk-taking behaviors that led to political success might also predispose to acts of sexual indiscretion. Farley writes a blog, "The People's Professor", for Psychology Today.

After the release of the fifth edition of the Diagnostic and Statistical Manual of Mental Disorders (DSM) in 2013, Farley characterized the system of psychiatric diagnosis as "beyond fixing" and said that it was "time to rethink the whole concept." He has specifically criticized the inclusion of somatic symptom disorder, saying, "Yes, the mind and body are intimately connected. But let's not create mental illnesses where hyper concern over serious physical health status is all that is going on."

Farley died on March 20th, 2026.

== Awards and honors ==
- Fellow, American Association for the Advancement of Science (AAAS)
- Fellow, AERA
- Fellow, Society for the Scientific Study of Sexuality
- Alumni of Influence, University of Saskatchewan, 2014

== Selected publications ==
=== Articles ===
- Farley, Frank H.; Farley, Sonja V. (1970). "Impulsiveness, sociability, and the preference for varied experience". Perceptual and Motor Skills. 31 (1): 47–50. doi:10.2466/pms.1970.31.1.47. PMID 5454503. S2CID 12422076.
- Farley, Frank H.; Sewell, Trevor (1976). "Test of an arousal theory of delinquency: Stimulation-seeking in delinquent and nondelinquent black adolescents". Criminal Justice and Behavior. 3 (4): 315–320. doi:10.1177/009385487600300402. S2CID 143626545.
- Farley, Frank H.; Davis, Sandy A. (1978). "Masseuses, men, and massage parlors: An expoloratory descriptive study". Journal of Sex & Marital Therapy. 4 (3): 219–225. doi:10.1080/00926237808403020. PMID 722823.
- Farley, Frank H.; Davis, Sandy A. (1980). "Personality and sexual satisfaction in marriage". Journal of Sex & Marital Therapy. 6 (1): 56–62. doi:10.1080/00926238008404246. PMID 7381949.
- Morehouse, Richard E.; Farley, Frank H.; Youngquist, James V. (1990). "Type T personality and the Jungian classification system". Journal of Personality Assessment. 54 (1–2): 231–5. doi:10.1207/s15327752jpa5401&2_22. PMID 2313544.
- Reyna, Valerie; Farley, Frank (2006). "Risk and rationality in adolescent decision making: Implications for theory, practice, and public policy". Psychological Science in the Public Interest. 7 (1): 1–44. doi:10.1111/j.1529-1006.2006.00026.x. PMID 26158695. S2CID 16591695.

=== Chapters ===
- "The Type-T Personality", in Self-regulatory Behavior and Risk Taking: Causes and Consequences (1991).
