= G. Michael Pressley =

American educational psychologist

George Michael Pressley (April 25, 1951 – May 22, 2006) was an American educational psychologist. He received the E. L. Thorndike Award in 2004.

He was born on April 25, 1951, in Sewickley, Pennsylvania. He graduated from Northwestern University in 1973 and received his Ph.D. from University of Minnesota in 1977.

He was a senior author of the Open Court Reading program.

He published more than 350 articles and books. He had served as the editor of Scientific Studies in Reading and Journal of Educational Psychology. Pressley died in May 2006 at the age of 55 from cancer, having previously overcome three battles with the disease in his life.
