= Sandra Graham =

Professor at University of California, Los Angeles

Sandra Graham is a professor of education at University of California, Los Angeles, where she holds the Presidential Chair in Education and Diversity. She received the E. L. Thorndike Award in 2013. She served as the Vice Chair of the UCLA Academic Senate for 2016–17, and continues to serve as the Chair for 2017–18.

== Biography ==
She received a B.A. from Barnard College, an M.A. from Columbia University and her PhD from UCLA.

Graham has a major research interests in academic motivation and social development in children of color, particularly in school contexts that vary in racial and ethnic diversity. Her research has covered student ethnic diversity in K–12 education. She has said schools need to be more proactive in teaching tolerance. Giving her opinion on L.A Unified's daily random weapons searches of high school students, Graham said there was little research on the effects of these searches, but “schools [begin] to look more like prisons where there’s a lot of surveillance. …This can lead for kids to greater negative perceptions of the school climate.”

In the aftermath of the 2012 Sandy Hook Elementary School shooting, Graham appeared to endorse the position that exposure to violent video games increases the likelihood of aggression.

== Awards ==
Among her many honors and awards, she was elected in 2015 to the National Academy of Education and received the 2014 E. L. Thorndike Career Award for Distinguished Contributions to Educational Psychology from the American Psychological Association.
