= Herbert Klausmeier =

American psychologist (1915–2014)

Herbert John Klausmeier (November 4, 1915 – May 20, 2014) was an American educational psychologist.

He served in the United States Navy from 1941 to 1946.

He received his PhD from Stanford University in 1949. He was behind the proposal that established the Wisconsin Center for Education Research.

He received the E. L. Thorndike Award in 1991.
