= Book talk =

Persuasive speech to promote literature

A book talk (or booktalk) is what is spoken with the intent to convince someone to read a book. Booktalks are traditionally conducted in a classroom setting for students; however, booktalks can be performed outside a school setting and with a variety of age groups as well. It is not a book review, a book report, or a book analysis. The booktalker gives the audience a glimpse of the setting, the characters, and/or the major conflict without providing the resolution or denouement. Booktalks attempt to make listeners care enough about the content of the book to want to read it. A long booktalk is usually about five to seven minutes long and a short booktalk is generally 180 seconds to 4 minutes long.

== Background ==
According to Carol Littlejohn (Keep Talking That Book! Booktalks to Promote Reading Volume II) there is "no known inventor of booktalking". As far back as teachers and librarians have promoted reading and literacy booktalks have existed. One of the oldest sources to mention the actual art form of booktalking is Amelia H. Munson's An Ample Field (1950) and in The Fair Garden and the Swarm of Beasts Margaret Edwards discusses performing booktalks in the 1930s when it was difficult to get into Baltimore schools. The actual term "booktalk" was coined in 1985 by children's author and literature teacher Aidan Chambers, in his book Booktalk: occasional writing on literature and children.

In the 1950s, booktalks were originally designed to motivate young adults to read because they had the freedom to read but chose not to. Teenagers do not read for a variety of reasons including (but not limited to): the notion that reading is not cool, unnecessary, and uninteresting. Books also have to compete with movies, television, the Internet, and other media. By the 1980s, there are also booktalks for adults. For example, booktalks in senior centers and in adult book discussion groups in libraries. Booktalks for adults were geared towards the recommendation of new titles rather than the motivation to read. By the 1990s, booktalks were also created for children to motivate kids to read at a younger age. However, booktalks for children focused heavily on teaching kids to read using mostly picture books.

== Purpose ==
The purpose of a booktalk is to motivate listeners in order to foster good reading, writing and speaking skills by encouraging self-directed learning through reading. Booktalkers also try to incorporate learning opportunities following a book talk which include discussion topics, ideas for journals, papers, poems or other creative writing, panel discussions or presentations (visually and/or orally). Book talks are commonly used by school and public librarians, teachers, and reading coaches, to get a reader interested in a book or to recommend similar books. It is an excellent tool for reading motivation. Booktalks were used long before the advent of the Digital Age, and the "traditional" booktalk of yesterday is still used today. However, librarians and educators have been able to utilize the Internet and computer software in order to modernize and improve book talks.

== Types of booktalks ==
=== Traditional ===
The traditional booktalk consists of a presenter using few tools to engage his audience, save the script he has created and a copy of the book itself. Having no real "bells and whistles", the booktalker has to get and keep his audience's attention. While there are plenty of sources available, both on the Web and in print (see external links and further reading below), that provide examples of ready-to-present booktalks most librarians and teachers recommend that the presenter read at least a part of the book he will be booktalking. The presenter must engage the audience as any good public speaker would, with an excited feeling, a non-monotonous tone of voice, and eye contact.

Genre booktalks and first-person booktalks are fairly popular. Genres to consider for a booktalk may include classics, sports, historical fiction, science fiction and fantasy, romance, fairy tales, short stories, mystery, adventure, non-fiction, short or thin books, horror, realistic contemporary fiction, humor, adult books, graphic novels, and poetry. A genre booktalk should consist of multiple books within one chosen genre. The number of books talked depends on the age of the audience. People prefer to have multiple genre booktalks ready in case the presenter starts to "lose" his audience.

The first person booktalk is considered most suitable for an "entertainer" presenter and is best suited for books written in first person. The booktalker presents himself as a character from a book. The presenter is not limited to characters of the same sex. However, when considering presenting an opposite sex first person booktalk the presenter must keep in mind his audience, as some audiences may be unable or unwilling to use their imagination during the booktalk.

Some librarians and educators consider the non-fiction booktalk to be the best way to win over a young adult audience. Non-fiction booktalks allow the presenter to tell astonishing yet true stories that can garner an emotional response. Non-fiction booktalks include a wide range of topics such as poetry, history, music, entertainment, crafts, folklore, crime, psychology, UFOs, etc. They lend themselves to audience participation, since the presenter can ask questions throughout the booktalk, such as, "Who has heard of a ___?" "Have you ever seen a ____?" or "Who knows what a ____ is?" Common approaches to nonfiction booktalks include using visual or mental imagery, vignettes, notable facts and astonishing statistics, booktalking in the first-person point of view, or initially presenting a nonfiction book as though it were fiction and surprising the audience by revealing that it is nonfiction. Indexes and appendixes are mentioned if they are included in the book.

=== Digital ===
From creating book talks on PowerPoint to creating a multimedia booktalk with sound clips and video excerpts, the booktalk has gotten a makeover thanks to the Digital Age (Keane & Cavanaugh, 2009). A number of websites, listed below, have been created solely for the purpose of sharing booktalks or guiding a librarian or educator on how to create one.

Teachers use these sites to create an assignment for their students, asking them to visit a certain number of sites, browse the reviews and/or booktalks and select one book from each site that interests them. From this list the student chooses one book to read and report on. The teacher creates a book review blog (i.e. ) and has the students post their reviews online, as well as comments on other student reviews, subject to teacher approval. By utilizing Web 2.0, such as wikis and podcasts, and software such as Power Point, the presenter creates multimedia booktalks that incorporate film and videos, music and the Internet. Using a projection screen and computer, the presenter no longer has to pass around a book to show cover art, illustrations, or photographs.

Within the scholastic setting librarians can work with teachers to create a set of rotating video booktalks that play in any location that have access to the school's closed-circuit television system. The video booktalk acts as a book trailer and can be as simple as a taped presentation from a podium to as complex as a reenactment of a scene from a book. The possibilities for the contents of a video booktalk are limited only to the creator's imagination and budget. Creating a video booktalk can be used a class assignment, teaching students not only the tools of a booktalk but incorporating the use of audio/visual materials. Software programs, such as Photo Story, iMovie, and Windows Movie Maker, can be used to create a video booktalk without any expensive equipment.

== Audience ==
To find out which types of booktalks work best, people create an evaluation form for the audience to complete. Some booktalkers may have a natural inclination for first-person booktalks, while others may present typical third-person book talks, or a book talk that's been digitally enhanced to keep the interest of the audience. The audience will also determine the length of the presentation, how many booktalks are presented, how much information to disclose, and the length of the individual booktalks. The audiences of booktalks are broken down into the following categories: students (broken down into the sub categories: young children, older children, and teens), adults, senior citizens and professionals (for librarians and educators).

Young children have shorter attention spans so booktalks must be kept brief. Older children and teens are able to focus and sit at attention for longer periods of time and so booktalk presentations can be built in to fit within one class period (30–45 minutes). Within this timeframe 15-20 booktalks that are 2–3 minutes in length can be presented. The presenter will want to appeal to as many students as possible so the individual booktalks should consist of many genres.

Adult and senior citizen booktalks are not strictly limited to adult titles. Choosing a children's title that will also pique the interest of adults helps keep this audience aware of current children's literature. The presenter does not limit himself/herself to the obvious literary groups and books clubs. Booktalks for senior citizens that relate to the life experiences or periods of time that the group may have lived during, help keep the audience intrigued and involved. The presenter takes into consideration books that available in large print or audio format for older audiences.

Booktalks for professionals, such as librarians and teachers, are generally up to 5 minutes in length and include plot summary, genre, interest and reading levels, and note controversial issues and curricular interests. Booktalks of this nature can be presented in a lecture format. The presenter also considers including critical reviews from reliable publications.

== Creating a traditional book talk ==
Most booktalk creators and presenters suggest only writing an outline of a booktalk so the booktalk can be presented less as a lecture and more as a conversation. They also recommend that the presenter not memorize a script. It is up to the discretion of the presenter exactly how much of the plot to talk about in the booktalk, but it is universally acknowledged that a booktalker should never give away the ending of the book.

In The Booktalker's Bible seven parameters are considered when planning a book talk: 1. Size of the group; 2. Age of the group; 3. Geography; 4. Time; 5. Money; 6. Frequency; and 7. Schedule. This title also lists six "Golden Rules of Booktalking": 1. Read the Book; 2. Like the Books You Booktalk; 3. Know Your Audience; 4. Booktalk; 5. Don't Tell the Ending!; 6. Leave a List.

When creating a booktalk, or editing a previously created booktalk, the presenter keeps the talk short and simple. The presenter grabs the audience's attention in the first sentence. Sonja Cole, host of the video booktalk website Bookwink.com, recommends keeping a booktalk for children to no more the seven sentences. When booktalking, the presenter connects with their previous experiences and engages with them. The presenter also defines and discusses the characteristics of the type of booktalk and some audiences will benefit from a comparison of print and film versions and why the book is almost always better.

There are a variety of ways to approach a book talk. Lucy Schall (author of many guides to book talks) describes the three following common ways to perform a book talk for all ages:

1. Sharing passages aloud and reader response
2. Reflecting on specific passages for discussion or writing
3. Preparing dramatic readings or performances

Caroline Feller Bauer offers the following unique alternatives to perform a booktalk for children:

1. Making and using crafts with children appropriate to the themes of your books
2. Performing simple magic tricks to illustrate the themes of your books
3. Using puppets to act out certain passages in a book, to give a booktalk or to narrate a story.

== Effectiveness of book talks ==
There is limited research conducted on the effectiveness of booktalks but they clearly demonstrate the increase of booktalked titles being circulated and lack of effect on reading attitudes.

Joni Bodart's dissertation (1987) concluded that:

1. Booktalked titles circulated from the library.
2. Overall attitudes towards reading is unaffected by booktalks.

Pamela Dahl's thesis (1988) concluded that:

1. Booktalks can have an effect on the number of pages that students report for independent reading.
2. Booktalks did not have any effect on students’ reading attitudes.
3. Gender breakdown in terms of reading interests was pronounced: 61 percent of females read one book a week compared to 21 percent of males.

Gail Reeder's dissertation (1991) concluded that:

1. Booktalking significantly increased the circulation of booktalk titles.
2. Booktalking did not result in a change in reading attitudes.
3. Booktalking increased circulation of selected titles but did not extend to other books.

Terrence David Nollen's dissertation (1992) concluded that:

1. Booktalking had no effect on reading attitudes.
2. Booktalking had significant effects on student's decisions to check out the booktalked titles.
3. Booktalking affected student choice, but only for a very short time.

== Bibliography ==
- Bauer, C. F. Leading kids to books through magic. Chicago: American Library Association, 1996.
- Bauer, C. F. Leading kids to books through puppets. Chicago: American Library Association, 1997.
- Bauer, C. F., & Laurent, R. Leading kids to books through crafts. Chicago: American Library Association, 2000.
- Baxter, K. A., & Kochel, M. A. Gotcha!: Nonfiction booktalks to get kids excited about reading. Englewood, Colo: Libraries Unlimited, 1999.
- Belben, Cathy. There Are No Booktalking Police: Alternatives to Stand-and-Deliver Presentations. Library Media Connections, 2(2) 2007, 28–29.
- Bodart, J. R. Booktalk!: Booktalking and school visiting for young adult audiences. New York: H.W. Wilson, 1980.
- Bodart, J. The effect of a booktalk presentation of selected titles on the attitude toward reading of senior high school students and on the circulation of these titles in the high school library. Ph.D. dissertation, Texas Woman's University, United States – Texas, 1987. Retrieved April 7, 2009, from Dissertations & Theses: Full Text database. (Publication No. AAT 8729673).
- Bromann, Jennifer. Booktalking That Works. Neal-Schuman Publishers, 2001.
- Cavanaugh, T.W. Creating a Video Booktalk Kiosk. Library Media Connection, 25 (2) 2006, 56–59.
- Charles, J.V. Get Real! Booktalking Nonfiction for Teen Read Week 2005. Young Adult Library Services, 4 (1) 2005, 12–16.
- Clark, R.E.C. Become the Character! First-Person Booktalks with Teens. Library Media Connection, 26(2) 2007, 24–26.
- Clark, Ruth Cox. Booktalk Evaluation Form. Library Media Connection, 27(1) 2008, 42.
- Cole, Sonja. Booktalks that Knock ‘em Dead. Teacher Librarian, 35(1) 2007, 41-42.
- Dahl, P. K. The effects of booktalks on self-selected reading. Thesis (M.S.)--Moorhead State University, 1988.
- Diamant-Cohen, Betsy & Levi, Selma K. Booktalking Bonanza: Ten Ready-to-Use Multimedia Sessions for the Busy Librarian. American Library Association, 2009.
- Gruenthal, H. 21st Century Booktalks! CSLA Journal, 31(2) 2008, 23-24.
- Jones, P. Connecting young adults and libraries: A how-to-do-it manual. New York: Neal-Schuman, 1998.
- Keane, Nancy J. Booktalking across the curriculum: the middle years. Westport: Libraries Unlimited, Teacher Ideas P, 2002.
- Keane, Nancy J., and Terence W. Cavanaugh. The tech-savvy booktalker: a guide for 21st-century educators. Westport: Libraries Unlimited, 2009
- Kenny, Robert, Gunter, Glenda. Digital Booktalk: Pairing Books with Potential Readers. Association for Educational Communications and Technology, 27: Oct 2004, 330-338.
- Lamme, Linda Leonard, Russo, Roseanne. Project Booktalk: Library Outreach to Family Day-Care Homes. Journal of Youth Services in Libraries, 15 (3) 2002, 36-40.
- Langemack, Chapple. The Booktalker's Bible: How to Talk about the Books You Love to Any Audience. Libraries Unlimited, Incorporated, 2003.
- Nollen, Terrence David. The effect of booktalks on the development of reading attitudes and the promotion of individual reading choices. Ph.D. dissertation, The University of Nebraska - Lincoln, United States – Nebraska, 1992. Retrieved April 7, 2009, from Dissertations & Theses: Full Text database. (Publication No. AAT 9225488).
- Paone, K.L. Talking up the BOOKS! Knowledge Quest, 33 (1) 2004, 22-23.
- Reeder, Gail M. Effect of booktalks on adolescent reading attitudes. Ph.D. dissertation, The University of Nebraska - Lincoln, United States – Nebraska, 1991. Retrieved April 7, 2009, from Dissertations & Theses: Full Text database. (Publication No. AAT 9129570).
- Saricks, J. Teaching Readers’ Advisory and the Art of Booktalking. Booklist, 102 (1) 2005, 61.
- Schall, L. Booktalks and beyond: Promoting great genre reads to teens. Westport, Conn: Libraries Unlimited, 2007.
