= Merlin Wittrock =

American psychologist

Merlin Carl Wittrock (January 3, 1931 – November 28, 2007) was an American educational psychologist. He received the E. L. Thorndike Award in 1987.

== Early life ==
He was born in Twin Falls, Idaho in 1931. He received a bachelor's and master's degrees from the University of Missouri and his PhD from the University of Illinois.

== Work ==
=== Generative theory of learning ===
Wittrock is best known for his generative theory of learning. He first published this theory in 1974. It is the parent of many current theories of academic motivation.

== Personal life ==
Wittrock had three children with his wife, Nancy. He died of heart failure in November 2007 at the age of 76.
