= Richard E. Snow =

American psychologist (1936–1997)

Richard Eric Snow (June 6, 1936 – December 5, 1997) was an American educational psychologist. He worked on learning styles.

He was born in Newark, New Jersey in 1936.

He was an important collaborator of Lee Cronbach's in his research on human ability in the 1970s.

He received the E. L. Thorndike Award in 1990.

APA Division 15: Education Psychology gives a yearly award named in his honor, the Richard E. Snow Award for Early Contributions.
