= Ernst Rothkopf =

Ernst Zacharias Rothkopf (December 28, 1925 – July 15, 2012) was an Austrian-born American educational psychologist. He received the E. L. Thorndike Award in 1985.

== Early life ==
He was born in Vienna, Austria. He fled from Nazi Germany to the United States and served in the United States Army during World War II.

He received his PhD from the University of Connecticut.

== Work ==
=== Mathemagenic effects ===
In 1966 he coined the term mathemagenic for behaviors that lead to learning, one of the first theories of learning that focused on internal processes. His ideas were based on his observation that what students learned from instruction is a transformed version of the knowledge their instructor intended to impart, which he thought required more than just the stimulus-response model of behaviorism.

== Personal life ==
He and his wife Carol had three children.
