= Reading motivation =

Drive for literacy

Reading motivation is the motivational drive to read, an area of interest in the field of education. Studying and implementing the conditions under which students are motivated to read is important in the process of teaching and fostering learning. Reading and writing motivation are the processes to put more effort on reading and writing activities.

Different strategies can be followed to develop a student's motivation to read.

- Integrating sensory organs with text materials. For example, when reading the word "apple", read it loudly, visualize, feel the texture, taste, and odor.
- Pronounce each word properly. Differentiate pronunciation for the purpose of spelling and for the purpose of communicating ideas.
- In pronunciation, give emphasis on phonic discrimination, such as, C-A-T, C-A-N.
- Change from extrinsic to intrinsic reading motivation. Although incentives are a good motivator, further interest in reading will come from intrinsic wants and needs. Instead of rewarding reading with a gift, relate reading completion to increased reading competency and accomplishment.
- Organize reading material in an attractive way.

For students who know how to read, but need extra encouragement, giving a book talk is a way to inspire reading. It is an especially effective tool with reluctant readers who need a hook before they will invest the energy into reading a book. Reading motivation for children can be enhanced when it is read with songs or music playing.

== Intrinsic and extrinsic motivation ==
Intrinsic motivation is when one does something because of personal interest in that particular thing. Extrinsic motivation has to do with avoiding the consequences of not doing something.

The motivation to read is one of the major factors that determine student success or failure in elementary school. Therefore, it is crucial to come up with ways to motivate and include all students to read. Reading is a task requiring interest and effort; as such, the reading skill of students has been associated with reading motivation. Students who are extremely motivated to read choose to find the time to read, which in turn will develop into a lifelong reading habit. Hence, motivation plays a crucial role in elementary schools to foster reading. Multiple factors, including both intrinsic and extrinsic motivators, significantly contribute to students' academic success in higher education. Intrinsic motivators, such as personal interest and enjoyment of learning, work in conjunction with extrinsic factors like career prospects and grades to shape student achievement and engagement in academic pursuits.

== Teachers' response to encourage intrinsic motivation in reading ==
The main goal of educators should be to move students motivation from extrinsic to intrinsic. Students who display intrinsic motivation in reading are more likely to read and thus learn and grow outside of the classroom. Teachers can improve intrinsic motivation in a variety of ways including:

1. Link real life experiences to text: students who feel as though they are reading things that are relevant to their personal interests are more likely to be involved in the reading of the story and classroom discussions
2. Selecting texts that connect to students' interests and backgrounds-reading articles or stories about common interests can spark conversations in classrooms as well as promote interest in reading the texts. If some students in a classroom play baseball, reading a story about a baseball player can spark interest and enthusiasm in the classroom
3. Give choices to students to allow them to take ownership of their reading-assigned readings (while sometimes necessary) do not encourage intrinsic motivation in reading. Rather, allowing students to have a choice in what they read allows them to take ownership of their own learning and can choose texts that is personally relevant to their culture and interests.
4. Provide constant positive feedback to students: because students who feel as though they are good readers will be more likely to want to read, always encouraging students that they are talented and able to read well can create increased intrinsic motivation
5. Encourage collaboration in the classroom that is centered around reading: students who work in groups and all individually contribute towards a common cause are more likely to be interested in the subject. Organizing small "book clubs" in the classroom that allow students to socialize and talk about a book can create a laid back atmosphere where students feel as though they can freely express their views and ideas about the texts, and will increase interest in the context of the article or story.

== Motivation within culture ==
Motivation in school is something that all members of a school community want to support in students, though few may realize that it can be influenced by culture. This means that because of the culture of each student, levels of motivation may be quite different. As of now, the cultural practice schools tend to follow is that of the dominant U.S. culture. However, many students come from families that are much more diverse. For example, students of the Navajo and Apache cultures are less likely to answer their teacher's question in class if it seems as though they are trying to compete with their peers. Students of lower SES families typically display lower motivation and achievement and are at greater risk for school failure and dropout. One of the most significant reasons for this is because of familial socialization within lower SES families. Their level of socialization within the family is much lower than that of a middle or higher class family. Therefore, teachers should be aware of the cultural identities of these and all students, which will represent their learning characteristics and motivation enhancing their learning achievement. Cultural backgrounds of learners are significant because ethnic, racial, linguistic, social, religious or economic differences can cause cultural disconnection leading corruption of motivation to learning. Researchers like Eleuterio (1997) and Hoelscher (1999) observed that classrooms filled with teachers and students who share their cultural identities build trust and foster stronger relationships, which leads to student engagement, higher motivation and excitement about learning together. If a school community truly wants to promote the success of all students, it must recognize how achievement motivation varies culturally within the population it serves.

== See also ==
- Patricia Alexander
- Book talk
