= Proust and the Squid =

2007 book by Maryanne Wolf

Proust and the Squid: The Story and Science of the Reading Brain is a 2007 book by Maryanne Wolf.

== Summary ==
=== Part I: How the brain learned to read ===
Wolf explains that the title of the book arises from the perspectives offered by humanistic reflection and neuroscience. Marcel Proust's rich accounts of the experience of reading (and the challenges posed to a reader by Proust's own literature), particularly as articulated in his essay "Sur la lecture", provides a reference point for the humanistic dimension. The squid, once the pre-eminent organism for neurological research because of the ease with which their neurons can be mapped, represents the scientific dimension.

Wolf emphasises to the reader that from an evolutionary point of view, reading is a recent activity: it requires each human brain to adapt itself to this non-instinctual task during a child's development. In the words of one reviewer, "this necessity of neural rewiring separates reading from processes such as vision or hearing which fall on a fixed developmental trajectory". Wolf charts a brief history of the development of writing and reading in human history, speculating on how early symbols called upon the brain's visual-recognition centres, and paying particular attention to the development of alphabetic scripts and the way in which these call upon the phonology of language and the auditory centres of the brain.

Wolf concludes the section by noting the alarm with which the ancient philosopher Socrates viewed the rise of literacy, and his fears that, in the summary of one reviewer, "reading and writing would degrade memory's role in education, erode analytical thought, and give a false sense of knowledge and understanding, leading to widespread misinterpretation". Wolf sees Socrates's fear as a precursor to her own fears about changes to reading culture during the emergence of digital technology.

=== Part II: How the brain learns to read over time ===
Wolf charts how individual children learn to read. She emphasises that reading depends on language skills that begin to develop even before birth, emphasising that "a child's ability to differentiate sounds, recognize rhymes, and engage in word play can strongly predict later reading ability". She also emphasises that before a child can learn to read with any competence, "the myelination of brain neurons in the angular gyrus region" must take place; in most children this occurs between the ages of five and seven years. Thus the development of young children's reading abilities is best underpinned by oral language development rather than literacy training as such.

Wolf also notes that languages whose spelling systems more closely approximate the sounds of the language are easier for children to learn to read than languages with a poor match between spelling and pronunciation (such as English), but that ultimately "the brain’s plasticity allows it to adapt to the demands of any visual presentation with equal efficiency".

=== Part III: When the brain can't learn to read ===
Wolf closes with a detailed exploration of difficulties faced by children in learning to read, emphasising that the phenomenon known as dyslexia can arise from a complex variety of behavioural, neurological, and genetic traits. She makes an impassioned argument for educational practices that recognise that dyslexic children can be enormously talented and that do not oppress these talents through a narrow focus on literacy training.

The book closes by musing on technological change, and whether digital media will lead to less analytical reading, or new and helpful reading skills and practices.

== Reception ==
George G. Hruby concluded that the book provided "the most comprehensive review of the state-of-the-science for the nonspecialist currently available [...] Unfortunately, broad scholarly review and deep analysis of reading research, its issues, and its history, is not evident".

Reviewers variously praised and disparaged the book's style. Hruby found that Wolf "writes in a spirited and energetic fashion and with well-written and appropriate anecdotes— the best from her own life and family", whereas the Kirkus Reviews assessment was that "regrettably, she conveys this useful information in off-putting prose assembled from an ill-assorted variety of components. The most oppressive, costive academic jargon rubs elbows with expressions of gee-whiz, ain't-this-amazin' enthusiasm".
