= Open Court Reading =

Reading program in English syllabus

The Open Court Reading Program is a core language arts/English series used in a large number of elementary schools classrooms. It was one of two reading programs adopted for use in California schools when textbooks were last chosen in 2002. The other was Houghton-Mifflin Reading. For the 2008 Edition, Open Court Reading's name was changed to Imagine It!

The series is published by McGraw-Hill Education.
