= Handbook of Educational Psychology =

Book published by the American Psychological Association

The Handbook of Educational Psychology has been published in three editions, appearing in 1996, 2006, and 2016. Produced by Division 15 of the American Psychological Association (APA), the handbook broadly presents the theories, evidence and methodologies of educational psychology.
