= William A. Brownell =

William Arthur Brownell
- Born: 19 May 1895; Smethport, Pennsylvania
- Died: 28 May 1977 (aged 82); Walnut Creek, California
- Known for: His work on the teaching and understanding of school maths.
- Partner: Kathryn K.

William Arthur Brownell (May 19, 1895 – May 28, 1977) was an American educational psychologist.

== Early life ==
Brownell was born in Smethport, Pennsylvania on May 19, 1895. He graduated from Allegheny College in 1917. He received a Ph.D. in 1926 from the University of Chicago.

== Academic career ==
From 1930 to 1949 he was a professor of educational psychology at Duke University, where he did his most important research.

From 1950 to his retirement in 1962 he was the Dean of the University of California, Berkeley Graduate School of Education.

While at Berkeley he wrote he wrote the elementary school Math textbooks used by many states, including California and Hawaii.

In 1965 he received the E. L. Thorndike Award.

=== Research Contributions ===
During a time when social utility theory dominated the influence on the mathematics curriculum in the US, Brownell conducted research around meaning theory:

The "meaning" theory conceives of arithmetic as a closely knit system of understandable ideas, principles, and processes. According to this theory, the test of learning is not mere mechanical facility in "figuring." The true test is an intelligent grasp upon number relations and the ability to deal with arithmetical situations with proper comprehension of their mathematical as well as their practical significance.

== Personal life ==
He married Kathryn K. (1903-2001) and they had three children.
