= Maryanne Wolf =

American writer, educator, and academic

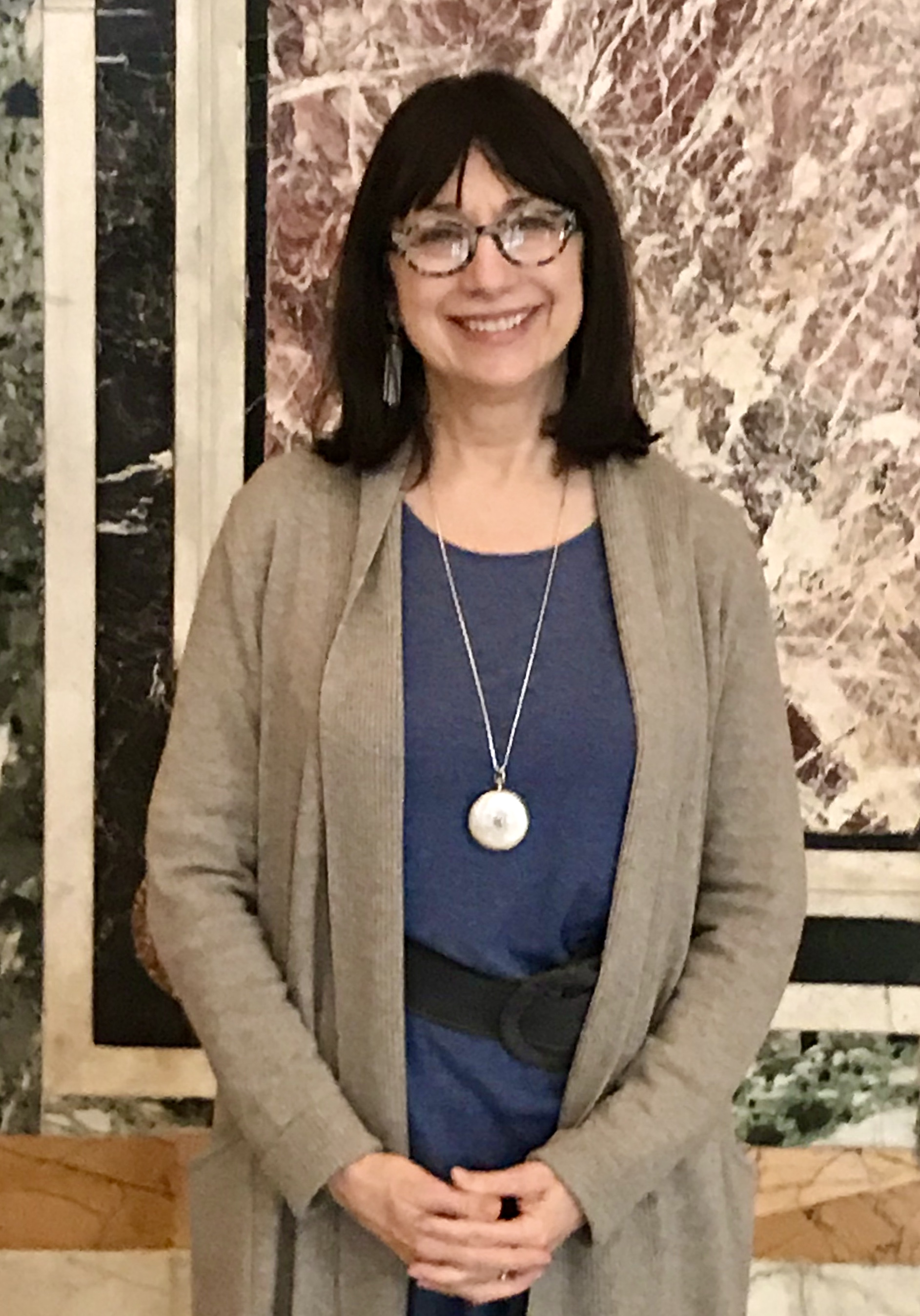
- Wolf in 2020
- Known for: Research on dyslexia, literacy in a digital culture, and the reading brain circuit

Academic background
- Education: Harvard University; Northwestern University; Saint Mary's College

Academic work
- Discipline: Neuroscience
- Sub-discipline: Developmental psycholinguistics
- Institutions: Tufts University; University of California, Los Angeles
- Notable works: Proust and the Squid: The Story and Science of the Reading Brain; Reader Come Home: The Reading Brain in a Digital World'
- Website: www.maryannewolf.com

Maryanne Wolf is a scholar, teacher, and advocate for children and literacy around the world. She is the UCLA Professor-in-Residence of Education, Director of the UCLA Center for Dyslexia, Diverse Learners, and Social Justice, and was the Chapman University Presidential Fellow from 2018 to 2022. She is also the former John DiBiaggio Professor of Citizenship and Public Service, Director of the Center for Reading and Language Research, and Professor in the Eliot-Pearson Department of Child Study and Human Development at Tufts University. She is a permanent academician in the Pontifical Academy of Sciences.

== Education and work ==
She completed her doctorate at Harvard University, in the Department of Human Development and Psychology in the Graduate School of Education, where she began her work in cognitive neuroscience and developmental psycholinguistics on the reading brain, literacy development, and dyslexia. She received her undergraduate and master's degrees in literature from Saint Mary's College and from Northwestern University.

Her work revolves around the study of development of the reading brain and the major impediments to its development, from genetically based dyslexia to environmentally based illiteracy. For the last two decades she has employed research in cognitive neuroscience, psycholinguistics, child development, and education to construct developmental models of the reading brain circuitry and the multiple component processes that are necessary for its acquisition. She proposed an alternative conceptualization of dyslexia which emphasizes the potential of multiple sources of breakdown, rather than previous, unidimensional explanations for dyslexia. Such a conceptualization became the basis for diagnostic tools that could pinpoint subtypes of struggling readers, and the development of more differential intervention for these children.

Within literacy areas, she has served on the Library of Congress Advisory Committee on Literacy Awards, and the Advisory Committee to the X Prize, whose new award will target Global Literacy, based in part on the recent work on literacy by her joint team in Ethiopia. With pediatric neurologist Martha Bridge Dencla she has published the RAN-RAS test for measuring naming speed, one of the best predictors of dyslexia across all languages. Funded by the National Institute for Child Health and Human Development, she created the RAVE-O intervention program for children with dyslexia and beginning readers. She was a Fellow (2014-2015) and Research Affiliate (2016-2017) at the Center for Advanced Study in the Behavioral Sciences at Stanford University, and currently serves on its advisory board. She serves also on the boards of Cox Campus and the new Centre for the Study of the History of Reading of the work.

She is currently working with members of the Dyslexia Center in the UCSF School of Medicine, as well as with the faculty at Chapman University on issues related to dyslexia and illiteracy in vulnerable populations and prisons. She served as an External Advisor to the International Monetary Fund, a research advisor to the Canadian Children's Literacy Foundation. She is a board member of the Dyslexia Foundation. She was recently elected a member of the Pontifical Academy of Science.

She has also raised concerns about broader trends in reading, saying that people's abilities to reflect on complex ideas in writing are diminishing.

== Awards ==
Selected awards include Distinguished Professor of the Year from the Massachusetts Psychological Association; the Teaching Excellence Award for Universities from the American Psychological Association. For her work in dyslexia she has received the Alice Ansara Award, the Norman Geschwind Lecture Award, and Samuel Orton Award. For her research she has received the NICHD Shannon Award for Innovative Research, which resulted in the RAVE-O reading intervention program; the Distinguished Researcher Award; the Fulbright Research Fellowship for work on dyslexia in Germany; the Christopher Columbus Award for intellectual discovery for her most recent work in Ethiopia and South Africa on the development of a digital learning experience that will bring literacy to children in remote regions of the world; the 2016 Australian Journal of Learning Difficulties Eminent Researcher from Learning Difficulties Australia; and the Dyslexia Research Hero award by Windward School in New York. Recently, she received The Dyslexia Foundation's Einstein Award, the national award from the Reading League for her contributions on reading research and the Walter Ong Award for Career Achievement in Scholarship for her work on the effects of different mediums on the intellectual development of the species. Dr. Wolf has received several honorary doctorates.

== Publications ==
- (Edited by Maryanne Wolf, Mark K. McQuillan, Eugene Radwin.) Thought & Language/Language & Reading. Reprint Series 14. Cambridge: Harvard Educational Review, 1980. ISBN 978-0916690151
- (Edited by Maryanne Wolf.) Dyslexia, Fluency, and the Brain. Timonium, Md.: York Press, 2001. ISBN 0912752602, OCLC 46975014
- Proust and the Squid: The Story and Science of the Reading Brain. New York: HarperCollins. 2007. ISBN 978-1848310308. OCLC 796268896. 15 Translations.
- Tales of Literacy for the 21st Century. Oxford University Press. 2016. ISBN 9780198724179. OCLC 964063198. with co-author Stephanie Gottwald
- Reader Come Home: The Reading Brain in a Digital World. New York: HarperCollins, 2018. 11 Translations. ISBN 9780062388780. OCLC 1047603037
- Over 170 scientific publications
