= Karen R. Harris =

American educational psychologist

Karen R. Harris is an American educational psychologist and special educator. She is currently Arizona State University Regents Professor Emeritus and Research Professor at the Mary Lou Fulton College for Teaching and Learning Innovation, Division for Advancing Education Policy, Practice, and Leadership.

== Career ==
Dr. Karen R. Harris is ASU Regents Professor Emeritus and the former Mary Emily Warner Endowed Professor of Education. Her experiences tutoring inner city children in Chicago during high school significantly impacted her future and contributed to a lifelong commitment to social justice. She has worked in education for more than 50 years, initially in 1975 as a general education teacher in a coal-mining town in West Virginia, and then from 1976-1978 as a special education teacher in Nebraska for students ages 13-21 with learning, emotional, behavioral, and/or cognitive challenges. Dr. Harris has chosen throughout her teaching and research career to work in schools in high poverty areas due to her commitment to improving teaching and learning for all students. Achieving equitable and quality education for all students is one important aspect of achieving social justice. Her research focuses on validating instructional approaches derived from integrating and triangulating results across multiple theoretical views and evidence-based practices, as well as effective PD for these approaches (Harris, 2024).

Her research focuses on validating instructional approaches derived from integrating and triangulating results across multiple theoretical views and evidence-based practices, as well as effective PD for these approaches (Harris, 2024). She developed the Self-Regulated Strategy Development (SRSD) model of strategies instruction, which has been deemed evidence-based in both special and general education. When an approach or set of strategies is proven to work, all teacher and student materials are provided free to all participating teachers, administrators, literacy and curriculum leaders, and coaches in these schools, as is practice-based PD at no cost.

She and her colleagues voluntarily support an organization dedicated to scaling up SRSD in schools, SRSDonline (https://srsdonline.org/). SRSD has been most extensively researched in the area of writing and close reading for writing across genres, although researchers have also addressed reading, math, and homework. Currently, SRSD instruction results in the largest effect sizes of any approach to writing instruction studied. Over 200 studies in over 12 countries have been reported. Her current research focuses on continued refinement of SRSD; practice-based professional development in SRSD for special and general educators; validating writing strategies in areas not yet addressed; development of new writing and reading strategies to address close reading and writing to learn; technology supported SRSD instruction; and integrating SRSD instruction with evidence-based practices in handwriting, spelling, sentence construction, vocabulary, and more in 1st and 2nd grade.

Dr. Harris is a former editor of the Journal of Educational Psychology, was senior editor of the American Psychological Association Educational Psychology Handbook (2012), and senior editor (along with Steve Graham) of the What Works for Special Needs Learners series published by Guilford Press. She has authored 16 books/handbooks and over 250 peer-reviewed articles and chapters in special education, general education, and educational psychology. She is a Fellow of both the American Psychological Association and the American Educational Research Association, and has served in leadership roles for AERA, APA, and CEC. She is also a member of the Reading Hall of Fame. She has received a number of awards including the Council for Exceptional Children Career Award for Research, the Career Award from APA Division 15 (Educational Psychology), the Samuel A. Kirk Award from the CEC Division of Learning Disabilities, Lifetime recognition for contributions to literacy from the European Literacy Network, the AERA Division C Scribner Award for a program of work that has significantly influenced thinking and research in the field of learning and instruction, the AERA Division K Exemplary Publication Award for research in professional development, and the Kauffman-Hallahan Distinguished Researcher Award from the Division for Research of CEC.

She has served as President of the Division for Research of the Council for Exceptional Children and as President of Division 15 (Educational Psychology) of the American Psychological Association. She has also served as an officer or committee member for the American Educational Research Association and on numerous committees or panels for organizations, including the National Institute of Child Health and Human Development, the International Reading Association, and the International Society for the Advancement of Writing Research. Further information can be found at https://search.asu.edu/profile/1980816.

== Selected Articles and Books ==
- ARTICLES
- Harris, K.R. (2024). The Self-Regulated Strategy Development instructional model: Efficacious theoretical integration, scaling up, challenges, and future research. Educational Psychology Review, 36, article 104. Article 104. https://doi.org/10.1007/s10648-024-09921-x
- Kim, Y. S. G., Harris, K. R., Goldstone, R., Camping, A., & Graham, S. (2024). The science of teaching reading is incomplete without the science of writing: A randomized control trial of integrated teaching of reading and writing. Scientific Studies of Reading, 29(1), 32–54. https://doi.org/10.1080/10888438.2024.2380272
- Kiuhara, S., Harris, K.R., Graham, S., Hacker, D.J., Brindle, M.E., McKeown, D. (2024). An RCT of PBPD and expert support for classwide SRSD instruction on timed narrative writing at 4th grade: Critical implications. Reading & Writing, 38(2), 1-34. https://link.springer.com/article/10.1007/s11145-023-10507-2
- Harris, K. R., Kim, Y-S., Yim, S., Camping, A., & Graham, S. (2023). Yes, they can: Developing transcription skills and oral language in tandem with SRSD instruction on close reading of science text to write informative essays at grades 1 and 2. Contemporary Educational Psychology, (73), 1-14. https://doi.org/10.1016/j.cedpsych.2023.102150
- Harris, K. R. (2021). SRSD instructional research for students with or at-risk for LD across the content areas: History and reflections. Using Self-Regulated Strategy Development to support students with and at-risk for learning disabilities across the content areas [Special issue], Learning Disabilities Research and Practice, (36), (3), 235-241. https://onlinelibrary.wiley.com/doi/10.1111/ldrp.12260
- McKeown, D., Brindle, M., Harris, K.R., Sandmel, K., Steinbrecher, T.D., Graham, S., Lane, K.L., & Oakes, W.P. (2019). Teachers’ voices: Perceptions of effective professional development and classwide implementation of self-regulated strategy development in writing. American Educational Research Journal, 56, 753-791. https://doi.org/10.3102/0002831218804146
- BOOKS
- Harris, K.R., Mason, L., Friedlander, B., McKeown, D., & Graham, S. (under contract), Powering Up Writing and Reading to Write: Classroom Proven Strategies Across Grades and Content Areas, Corwin Publishing
- Fidalgo, R., Harris, K.R., & Braaksma, M. (Eds.) (2018). Design principles for teaching effective writing: Theoretically and empirically grounded principles. In R. Fidalgo & T. Olive (Series Eds.), Studies in Writing: Vol. X, Leiden, NL: Brill Editions.
- Harris, K.R., & Meltzer, L. (Eds.) (2015). The power of peers in the classroom: Enhancing learning and social skills. NY: Guilford.
- Harris, K. R., Graham, S., Mason, L., & Friedlander, B. (2008). Powerful writing strategies for all students. Baltimore, MD: Brookes Publishing.
- Graham, S., & Harris, K.R. (2005). Writing better: Teaching writing process and self-regulation to students with learning problems. Baltimore, MD: Brookes.
- Harris, K.R., & Graham, S. (1992/96). Making the writing process work: Strategies for composition and self-regulation (2nd ed.). Cambridge: Brookline Books. 1992 (2nd ed. 1996, ISBN 1571290109 [pbk])
- Harris, K.R., & Graham, S. (1992). Helping young writers master the craft: Strategy instruction and self-regulation in the writing process. Cambridge: Brookline Books.
- Karen R. Harris, Steve Graham, Timothy C. Urdan: APA Educational Psychology Handbook: Individual differences and cultural and contextual factors (APA = American Psychological Association). Vol. 2 of the 'APA Educational Psychology Handbook'. APA-Verlag 2011, ISBN 9781433809965
- Steve Graham, K.R. Harris (1997): Whole language and process writing: Does one approach fit all ? In: Issues in Educating Students With Disabilities, p. 239 - 260
- Fidalgo, R., Harris, K.R., & Braaksma, M. (Eds.) (2018). Design principles for teaching effective writing: Theoretically and empirically grounded principles. In R. Fidalgo & T. Olive (Series Eds.), Studies in Writing: Vol. X, Leiden, NL: Brill Editions.
- Harris, K.R., & Meltzer, L. (Eds.) (2015). The power of peers in the classroom: Enhancing learning and social skills. NY: Guilford.
- Harris, K. R., Graham, S., Mason, L., & Friedlander, B. (2008). Powerful writing strategies for all students. Baltimore, MD: Brookes Publishing.

For others see 'External links'
