= United States presidential election =

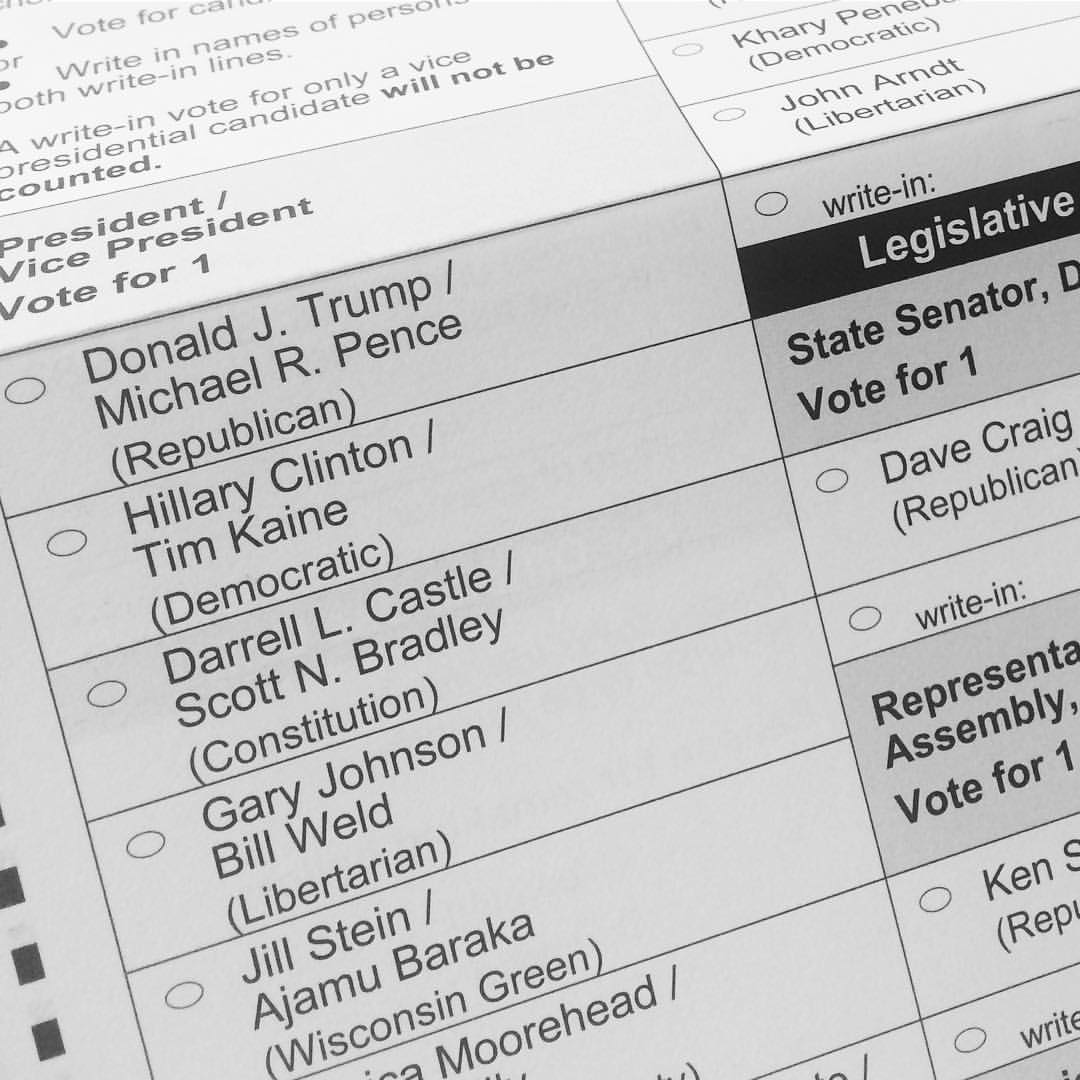
A ballot for the 2016 presidential election and for other elections that year, listing the presidential and vice presidential candidates

The election of the president and vice president of the United States is an indirect election in which citizens of the United States who are registered to vote in one of the fifty U.S. states or in Washington, D.C., cast ballots not directly for those offices, but instead for members of the Electoral College. (Note: Individual states select electors by methods decided at the state level. Since 1876, all states have selected electors by statewide popular vote. See the United States Electoral College article for more information.) These electors then cast direct votes, known as electoral votes, for the presidential and vice presidential candidate. The candidate who receives an absolute majority of electoral votes (at least 270 out of 538, since the Twenty-third Amendment granted voting rights to citizens of D.C.) is then elected to that office. If no candidate receives an absolute majority of the votes for president, the House of Representatives elects the president; likewise if no one receives an absolute majority of the votes for vice president, then the Senate elects the vice president.

United States presidential elections differ from many other republics around the world (operating under either the presidential system or the semi-presidential system) which use direct elections from the national popular vote ('one person, one vote') of their entire countries to elect their respective presidents. The United States instead uses indirect elections for its president through the Electoral College, and the system is highly decentralized like other elections in the United States. The Electoral College and its procedure are established in the U.S. Constitution by Article II, Section 1, Clauses 2 and 4; and the Twelfth Amendment (which replaced Clause 3 after its ratification in 1804). Under Clause 2, each state casts as many electoral votes as the total number of its Senators and Representatives in Congress, while (per the Twenty-third Amendment, ratified in 1961) Washington, D.C., casts the same number of electoral votes as the least-represented state, which is three. Also under Clause 2, the manner for choosing electors is determined by each state legislature, not directly by the federal government. Many state legislatures previously selected their electors directly, but over time all switched to using votes cast by state voters to choose the state's members of the electoral college (electors). Beyond the parameters set in the U.S. Constitution, state law, not federal, regulates most aspects of administering the popular vote, including most of the voter eligibility and registration requirements.

Almost all states require that the winner of the plurality of its constituent statewide popular vote ('one person, one vote') shall receive all of that state's electors ("winner-takes-all'). A couple - Nebraska and Maine - determine a part of their electors by use of district votes within the respective state. Eighteen states also have specific laws that punish electors who vote in opposition to the plurality, known as "faithless" or "unpledged" electors. In modern times, faithless and unpledged electors have not affected the ultimate outcome of an election, so the results can generally be determined based on the state-by-state popular vote.

In addition, most of the time, the winner as determined by the electoral college also has received the largest part of the national popular vote. There have been four exceptions: 1876, 1888, 2000, and 2016, in which the Electoral College winner's portion of the popular vote was surpassed by an opponent. Although taking fewer votes, the winner claimed more electoral college seats, due to winning close and narrow pluralities in numerous swing states. In addition, the 1824 election was the only presidential election under the current system decided by a contingent election in Congress that elected a different president than the candidate with a plurality in both the electoral and popular vote. (The 1800 election and the 1824 election were decided in the House. In 1800, the House winner was the candidate who had won a plurality of the popular vote.)

Presidential elections occur every four years on Election Day, which since 1845 has been the first Tuesday after the first Monday in November. This date coincides with the general elections of various other federal, state, and local races; since local governments are responsible for managing elections, these races typically all appear on one ballot. The Electoral College electors then formally cast their electoral votes on the first Monday after December 12 at their state's capital. Congress then certifies the results in early January, and the presidential term begins on Inauguration Day, which since the passage of the Twentieth Amendment has been set at January 20.

The nomination process, consisting of the primary elections and caucuses and the nominating conventions, was not specified in the Constitution, but was developed over time by the states and political parties. These primary elections are generally held between January and June before the general election in November, while the nominating conventions are held in the summer. Though not codified by law, political parties also follow an indirect election process, where voters in the fifty states, Washington, D.C., and U.S. territories, cast ballots for a slate of delegates to a political party's nominating convention, who then elect their party's presidential nominee. Each party may then choose a vice presidential running mate to join the ticket, which is either determined by choice of the nominee or by a second round of voting. Because of changes to national campaign finance laws since the 1970s regarding the disclosure of contributions for federal campaigns, presidential candidates from the major political parties usually declare their intentions to run as early as the spring of the previous calendar year before the election (almost 21 months before Inauguration Day).

== History ==
=== Electoral College ===
Article Two of the Constitution originally established the method of presidential elections, including the creation of the Electoral College. This was the result of a compromise between those constitutional framers who wanted Congress to choose the president and those who preferred a national popular vote.

As set forth in Article Two, each state is allocated a number of electors equal to the number of its delegates in both houses of Congress, combined. In 1961, the ratification of the Twenty-Third Amendment granted a number of electors to the District of Columbia, an amount equal to the number of electors allocated to the least populous state. However, U.S. territories are not allocated electors, and therefore are not represented in the Electoral College.

=== State legislatures - direct election ===
Constitutionally, the legislature of each state determines how its electors are chosen; Article II, Section 1, Clause 2 states that each state shall appoint electors "in such Manner as the Legislature Thereof May Direct". During the first presidential election in 1789, in four of the 11 states of the time, the electors were elected directly by voters. In two others, a hybrid system was used where both the voters and the state legislatures took part in electing the electors. In five, the state legislatures themselves elected the electors. (Note: Of the 13 original states during the 1789 election, six states chose electors by some form of popular vote, four states chose electors by a different method, North Carolina and Rhode Island were ineligible to participate since they had not yet ratified the U.S. Constitution, and New York failed to appoint their allotment of electors in time because of a deadlock in their state legislature.)

Gradually more states began conducting popular elections to choose their slate of electors. In 1800, five of the 16 states chose electors by a popular vote; by 1824, after the rise of Jacksonian democracy, 18 of the 24 states chose electors by popular vote. (In most cases simple state-wide plurality is sufficient to elect a general ticket using popular vote. But in the first presidential election in 1789, for example, some states used "open" list block voting; Maryland used block voting but had guaranteed seats for different parts of the state; Virginia elected its 12 electors by first-past-the-post voting contest in 12 districts. Other states later used multi-member districts, each covering a part of the state, to elect their electors.)

This movement toward greater democratization coincided with a gradual decrease in property restrictions for the franchise. By 1840, only one of the 26 states (South Carolina) still selected electors by the state legislature. Every other state was electing its electors by general ticket plurality voting state-wide. By 1872 no states elected their electors using the state legislature. In 1876, Colorado chose its electors via the state legislature for the first and only time - after that, all states chose their electors via general election. And today only two states - Maine and Nebraska - elect at least some of their electors through a different method than that general ticket method, in their cases it is First-past-the-post voting in districts covering part of the state.

=== Vice presidents ===
Under the original system established by Article 2, electors cast votes for two candidates for president. The candidate with the highest number of votes (provided it was a majority of the electoral votes) became the president, and the second-place candidate became the vice president. This presented a problem during the presidential election of 1800 when Aaron Burr received the same number of electoral votes as Thomas Jefferson and challenged Jefferson's election to the office. In the end, Jefferson was chosen as the president because of Alexander Hamilton's influence in the House.

In response to the 1800 election, the 12th Amendment was passed, requiring electors to cast two distinct votes: one for president and another for vice president. While this solved the problem at hand, it reduced the prestige of the vice presidency, as the office was no longer held by the leading challenger for the presidency. The separate ballots for president and vice president became something of a moot issue later in the 19th century when it became the norm for popular elections to determine a state's Electoral College delegation. Electors chosen this way are pledged to vote for a particular presidential and vice presidential candidate (offered by the same political party). Although the president and vice president are legally elected separately, in practice they are chosen together.

=== Tie votes ===
The Twelfth Amendment also established rules when no candidate wins a majority vote in the Electoral College. In the presidential election of 1824, Andrew Jackson received a plurality, but not a majority, of electoral votes cast. The election was thrown to the House, and John Quincy Adams was elected president. A deep rivalry resulted between Andrew Jackson and House Speaker Henry Clay, who had also been a candidate in the election.

Since the vice presidential candidate John Calhoun received a majority of votes, having been on the ticket for both Jackson and Adams, there was no need for the Senate to vote for a vice president.

=== Popular vote ===
Since 1824, aside from the occasional "faithless elector", the popular vote indirectly determines the winner of a presidential election by determining the electoral vote, as each state or district's popular vote determines its electoral college vote. Although the nationwide popular vote does not directly determine the winner of a presidential election, it does strongly correlate with who is the victor. In 54 of the 59 total elections held so far (about 91 percent), the winner of the national popular vote has also carried the Electoral College vote. The winners of the nationwide popular vote and the Electoral College vote have differed only in close elections. In highly competitive elections, candidates focus on turning out their vote in the contested swing states critical to winning an electoral college majority, so they do not try to maximize their popular vote by real or fraudulent vote increases in one-party areas.

However, candidates have failed to get the most votes in the nationwide popular vote in a presidential election and still won. In the 1824 election, Jackson won the popular vote, but no one received a majority of electoral votes. According to the Twelfth Amendment, the House must choose the president out of the top three people in the election. Clay had come in fourth, so he threw his support to Adams, who then won. Because Adams later named Clay his Secretary of State, Jackson's supporters claimed that Adams gained the presidency by making a deal with Clay. Charges of a "corrupt bargain" followed Adams through his term.

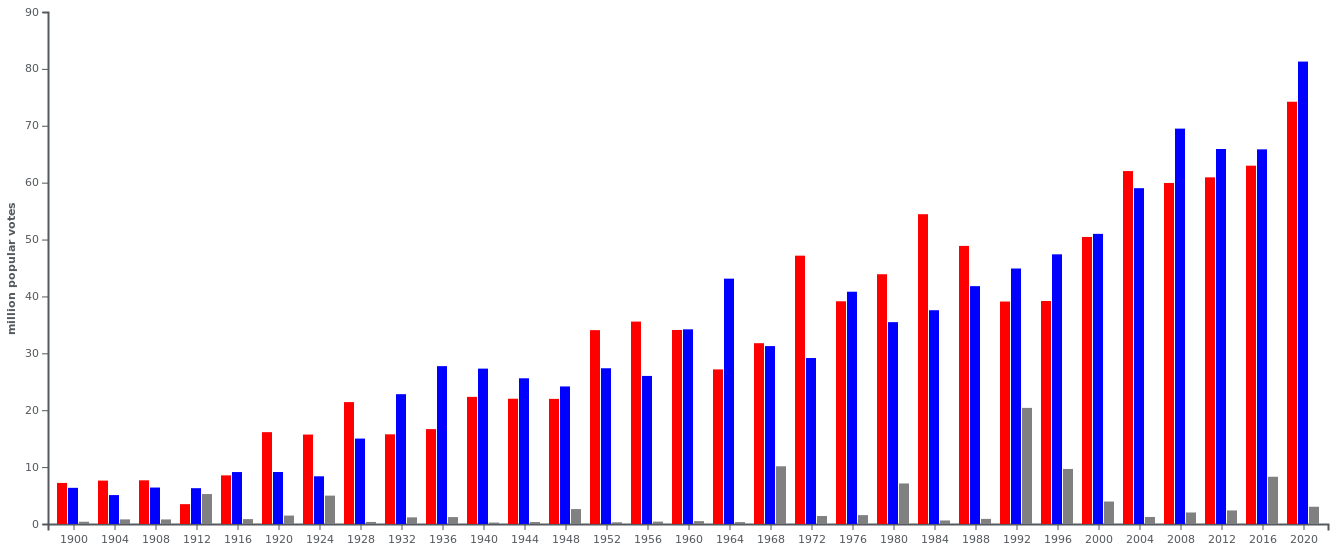
Comparison of the popular vote totals from 1900 to 2020. Republican Democratic All other candidates together

In five presidential elections (1824, 1876, 1888, 2000, and 2016), the winner of the electoral vote lost the popular vote outright. Numerous constitutional amendments have been submitted seeking to replace the Electoral College with a direct popular vote, but none has ever successfully passed both Houses of Congress. Another alternate proposal is the National Popular Vote Interstate Compact, an interstate compact whereby individual participating states agree to allocate their electors based on the winner of the national popular vote instead of their respective statewide results.

=== Electoral Count Act of 1887 ===
Congress passed the Electoral Count Act in 1887 in response to the disputed 1876 election, in which several states submitted competing slates of electors. The law established procedures for the counting of electoral votes. It has subsequently been codified into law in Title 3 of the United States Code. It also includes a "safe harbor" deadline where states must finally resolve any controversies over the selection of their electors.

=== Inauguration day ===
The Twentieth Amendment set the inauguration of the president-elect of the United States to January 20th of the year following their election. Prior to the Twentieth Amendment, the president was to be inaugurated on March 4th of the year following election. The length of time in between the election in November and the inauguration in March created an extended "lame duck" period, when the remainder of a term is served despite a new president-elect. The January date set by the Twentieth Amendment shortened this period.

=== Campaign spending ===
The Federal Election Campaign Act of 1971 was enacted to increase disclosure of contributions for federal campaigns. Subsequent amendments to law require that candidates to a federal office must file a Statement of Candidacy with the Federal Election Commission before they can receive contributions aggregating in excess of $5,000 or make expenditures aggregating in excess of $5,000. Thus, this began a trend of presidential candidates declaring their intentions to run as early as the spring of the preceding calendar year so they can start raising and spending the money needed for their nationwide campaign.

=== Political parties ===
There is no provision for the role of political parties in the U.S. Constitution, since the Founding Fathers did not originally intend for American politics to be partisan. Thus, the first president, George Washington, was elected as an independent. Since the emergence of the American two-party system, and the election of Washington's successor, John Adams, in 1796, all winners of U.S. presidential elections have represented one of two major parties. Third parties have taken second place only twice, in 1860 and 1912. The last time a third (independent) candidate achieved significant success (although still finishing in third place) was Ross Perot in 1992, and the last time a third-party candidate received any electoral votes not from faithless electors was George Wallace in 1968.

=== Primaries, caucuses, and nominating conventions ===
In the first two presidential elections, the Electoral College handled both the nominations and elections in 1789 and 1792 that selected Washington. Starting with the 1796 election, congressional party or a state legislature party caucus selected the party's presidential candidates. That system collapsed in 1824, and since 1832 the preferred mechanism for nomination has been a national convention. Delegates to the national convention were usually selected at state conventions whose own delegates were chosen by district conventions. Sometimes they were dominated by intrigue between political bosses who controlled delegates; the national convention was far from democratic or transparent.

Progressive Era reformers then looked to the primary election as a way to measure popular opinion of candidates, as opposed to the opinion of the bosses. Florida enacted the first presidential primary in 1901. The Wisconsin direct open primary of 1905 was the first to eliminate the caucus and mandate direct selection of national convention delegates. In 1910, Oregon became the first state to establish a presidential preference primary, which requires delegates to the National Convention to support the winner of the primary at the convention. The impetus for national adoption of the binding primary election was the 1968 Democratic National Convention. Vice President Hubert Humphrey secured the presidential nomination despite not winning a single primary under his own name. After this, a Democratic National Committee-commissioned panel led by Senator George McGovern – the McGovern–Fraser Commission – recommended that states adopt new rules to assure wider participation. A large number of states, faced with the need to conform to more detailed rules for the selection of national delegates in 1972, chose a presidential primary as an easier way to come into compliance with the new national Democratic Party rules. The result was that many more future delegates would be selected by a state presidential primary. The Republicans also adopted many more state presidential primaries.

== Procedure ==
=== Eligibility requirements ===
The hand-written copy of the natural-born-citizen clause as it appeared in 1787

Article Two of the Constitution stipulates that for a person to serve as president, the individual must be a natural-born citizen of the United States, at least 35 years old, and a resident of the United States for a period of no less than 14 years. A candidate may start running their campaign early before turning 35 years old or completing 14 years of residency, but must meet the age and residency requirements by Inauguration Day. The Twenty-second Amendment to the Constitution also sets a term limit: a president cannot be elected to more than two terms.

The U.S. Constitution also has two provisions that apply to all federal officers appointed by the president, and debatably also to the presidency. When Senator Barack Obama was elected president a legal debate concluded that the president was not an "office under the United States" for many reasons, but most significantly because Article I, Section 3, Clause 7 would violate the legal principle of surplusage if the president were also a civil officer. There exists no case law to resolve the debate however public opinion seems to favor that the presidency is also bound by the following qualifications:

Upon conviction at impeachment, the Senate may vote to disqualify that person from holding any "public office... under the United States" in the future. Section 3 of the Fourteenth Amendment prohibits the election to any federal office of any person who engaged in insurrection after having held any federal or state office, rebellion or treason; this disqualification can be waived if such an individual gains the consent of two-thirds of both houses of Congress.

In addition, the Twelfth Amendment establishes that the vice president must meet all the qualifications of being a president.

Although not a mandatory requirement, Federal campaign finance laws including the Federal Election Campaign Act state that a candidate who intends to receive contributions aggregating in excess of $5,000 or make expenditures aggregating in excess of $5,000, among others, must first file a Statement of Candidacy with the Federal Election Commission. This has led presidential candidates, especially members from the two major political parties, to officially announce their intentions to run as early as the spring of the previous calendar year so they can start raising or spending the money needed for their nationwide campaign. Potential candidates usually form exploratory committees even earlier to determine the feasibility of them actually running.

=== Decentralized election system and voter eligibility ===
The U.S. presidential election process, like all other elections in the United States, is a highly decentralized system. While the U.S. Constitution does set parameters for the election of the president and other federal officials, state law, not federal, regulates most aspects of elections in the U.S., including the primaries, the eligibility of voters (beyond the basic constitutional definition), and the specific details of running each state's electoral college meeting. All elections, including federal, are administered by the individual states.

Thus, the presidential election is really an amalgamation of separate state elections instead of a single national election run by the federal government. Candidates must submit separate filings in each of the 50 states if they want to qualify on each state's ballot, and the requirements for filing vary by state.

The eligibility of an individual for voting is set out in the Constitution and regulated at state level. The 15th, 19th and 26th Amendments to the Constitution state that suffrage cannot be denied on grounds of race or color, sex, or age for citizens eighteen years or older, respectively. Beyond these basic qualifications, it is the responsibility of state legislatures to regulate voter eligibility and registration. And the specific requirements for voter eligibility and registration also vary by state, e.g. some states ban convicted felons from voting.

=== Nominating process ===
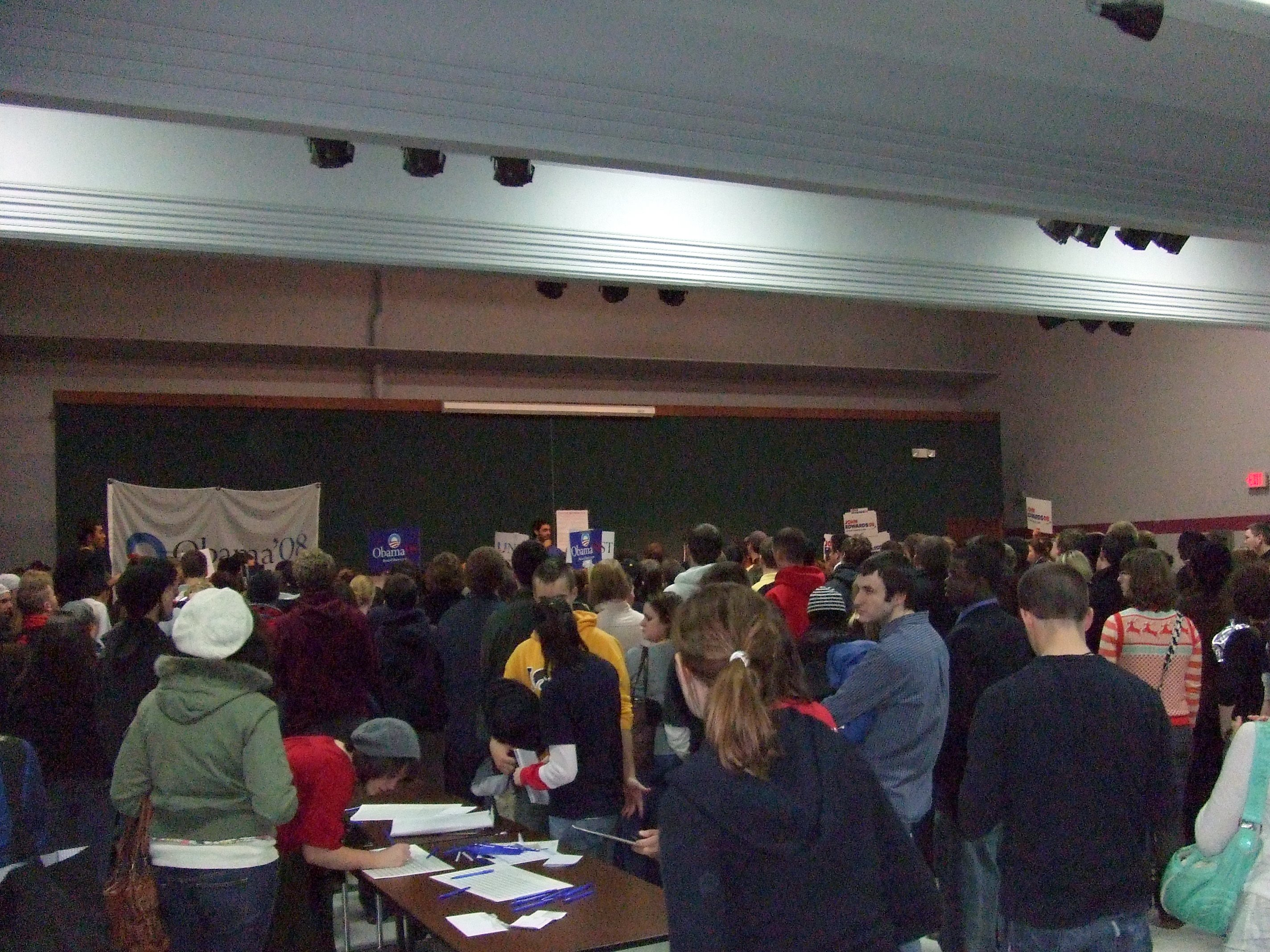
A 2008 Democratic caucus meeting in Iowa City, Iowa. The Iowa caucuses are traditionally the first major electoral event of presidential primaries and caucuses.

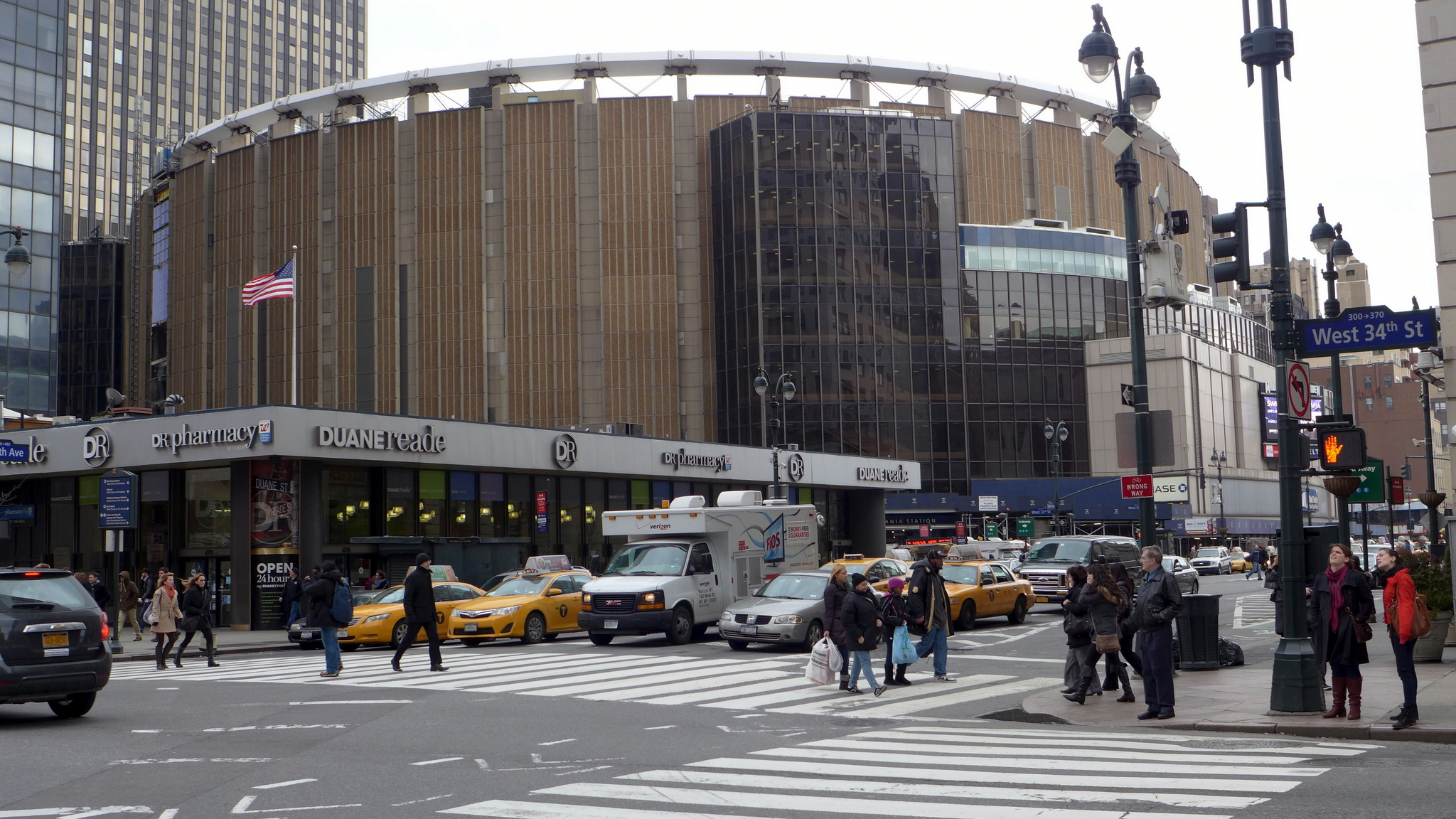
Madison Square Garden in New York City, the site of the 1976, 1980, and 1992 Democratic National Conventions; and the 2004 Republican National Convention

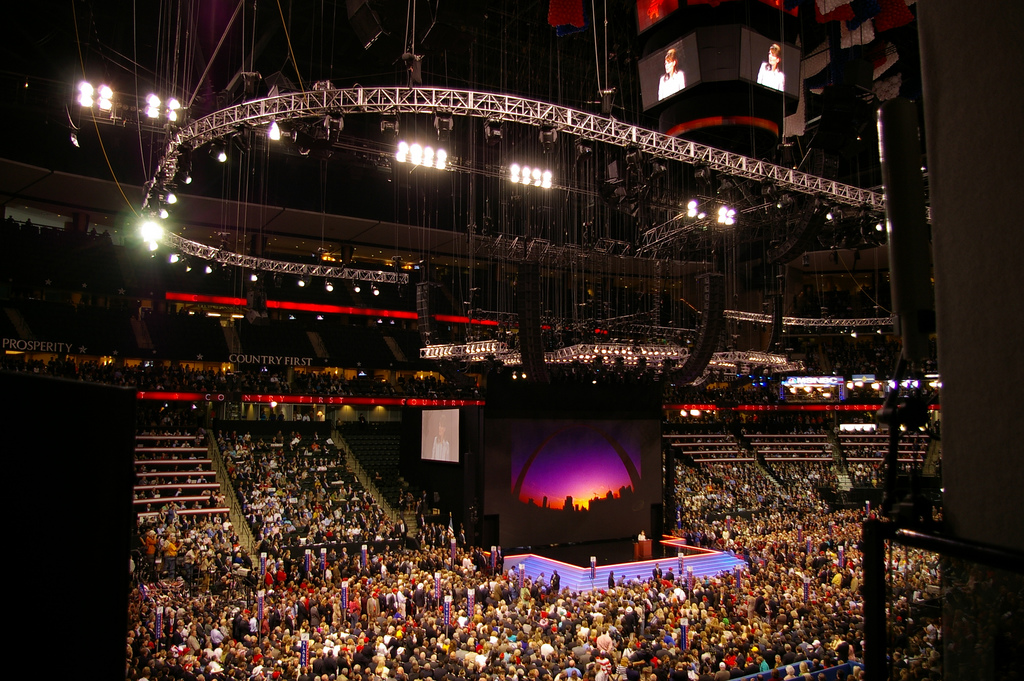
The floor of the 2008 Republican National Convention at the Xcel Energy Center in Saint Paul, Minnesota

The modern nominating process of U.S. presidential elections consists of two major parts: a series of presidential primary elections and caucuses held in each state, and the presidential nominating conventions held by each political party. This process was never included in the Constitution, and thus evolved over time by the political parties to clear the field of candidates.

The primary elections are run by state and local governments, while the caucuses are organized directly by the political parties. Some states hold only primary elections, some hold only caucuses, and others use a combination of both. These primaries and caucuses are staggered generally between January and June before the federal election, with Iowa and New Hampshire traditionally holding the first presidential state caucus and primary, respectively.

Like the general election, presidential caucuses or primaries are indirect elections. The major political parties officially vote for their presidential candidate at their respective nominating conventions, usually all held in the summer before the federal election. Depending on each state's law and state's political party rules, when voters cast ballots for a candidate in a presidential caucus or primary, they may be voting to award delegates "bound" to vote for a candidate at the presidential nominating conventions, or they may simply be expressing an opinion that the state party is not bound to follow in selecting delegates to their respective national convention.

Unlike the general election, voters in the U.S. territories can also elect delegates to the national conventions. Furthermore, each political party can determine how many delegates to allocate to each state and territory. In 2012 for example, the Democratic and Republican party conventions each used two different formulas to allocate delegates. The Democrats-based theirs on two main factors: the proportion of votes each state gave to the Democratic candidate in the previous three presidential elections, and the number of electoral votes each state had in the Electoral College. In contrast, the Republicans assigned to each state 10 delegates, plus three delegates per congressional district. Both parties then gave a fixed number of delegates to each territory, and finally bonus delegates to states and territories that passed certain criteria.

Along with delegates chosen during primaries and caucuses, state and U.S. territory delegations to both the Democratic and Republican party conventions also include "unpledged" delegates who have a vote. For Republicans, they consist of the three top party officials from each state and territory. Democrats have a more expansive group of unpledged delegates called "superdelegates", who are party leaders and elected officials.

Each party's presidential candidate also chooses a vice presidential nominee to run with him or her on the same ticket, and this choice is rubber-stamped by the convention.

If no single candidate has secured a majority of delegates (including both pledged and unpledged), then a "brokered convention" results. All pledged delegates are then "released" and can switch their allegiance to a different candidate. Thereafter, the nomination is decided through a process of alternating political horse trading, and additional rounds of re-votes.

The conventions have historically been held inside convention centers, but since the late 20th century both the Democratic and Republican parties have favored sports arenas and domed stadiums to accommodate the increasing attendance.

=== Campaign strategy ===
One major component of getting elected to any office is running a successful campaign. There are, however, multiple ways to go about creating a successful campaign. Several strategies are employed by candidates from both sides of the political spectrum. Though the ideas may differ the goal of them all are the same, "...to mobilize supporters and persuade undecided voters..." (Sides et al., pg. 126 para, 2).

The goal of any campaign strategy is to create an effective path to victory for the intended candidate. Joel Bradshaw is a political scientist who has four propositions necessary to develop such a strategy. The first one being, the separation of the eligible voters into three groups: Undecided voters, opponent voters, and your voting base. Second, is the utilization of previous election results and survey data that can be used to identify who falls into the categories given in section one. Third, it is not essential, nor possible to get the support of every voter in an election. The campaign focus should be held mostly to keeping the base and using data to determine how to swing the undecided voters. Fourth, now that the campaign has identified the ideal base strategy, it is now time to allocate resources properly to make sure your strategy is fulfilled to its extent, (Sides et al. pg. 126, para 4, and pg. 127, para 1).

Campaign tactics are also an essential part of any strategy and rely mostly on the campaign's resources and the way they use them to advertise. Most candidates draw on a wide variety of tactics in the hopes to flood all forms of media, though they do not always have the finances. The most expensive form of advertising is running ads on broadcast television and is the best way to reach the largest number of potential voters. This tactic does have its drawback, however, as it is the most expensive form of advertisement. Even though it reaches the largest number of potential voters it is not the most effective way of swaying voters. The most effective way is believed to be through personal contact as many political scientists agree. It is confirmed that it is much more effective than contacting potential voters by email or by phone, (Sides et al., pg. 147 para, 2, 3). These are just some of the wide variety of tactics used in campaigns.

=== The popular vote on Election Day ===
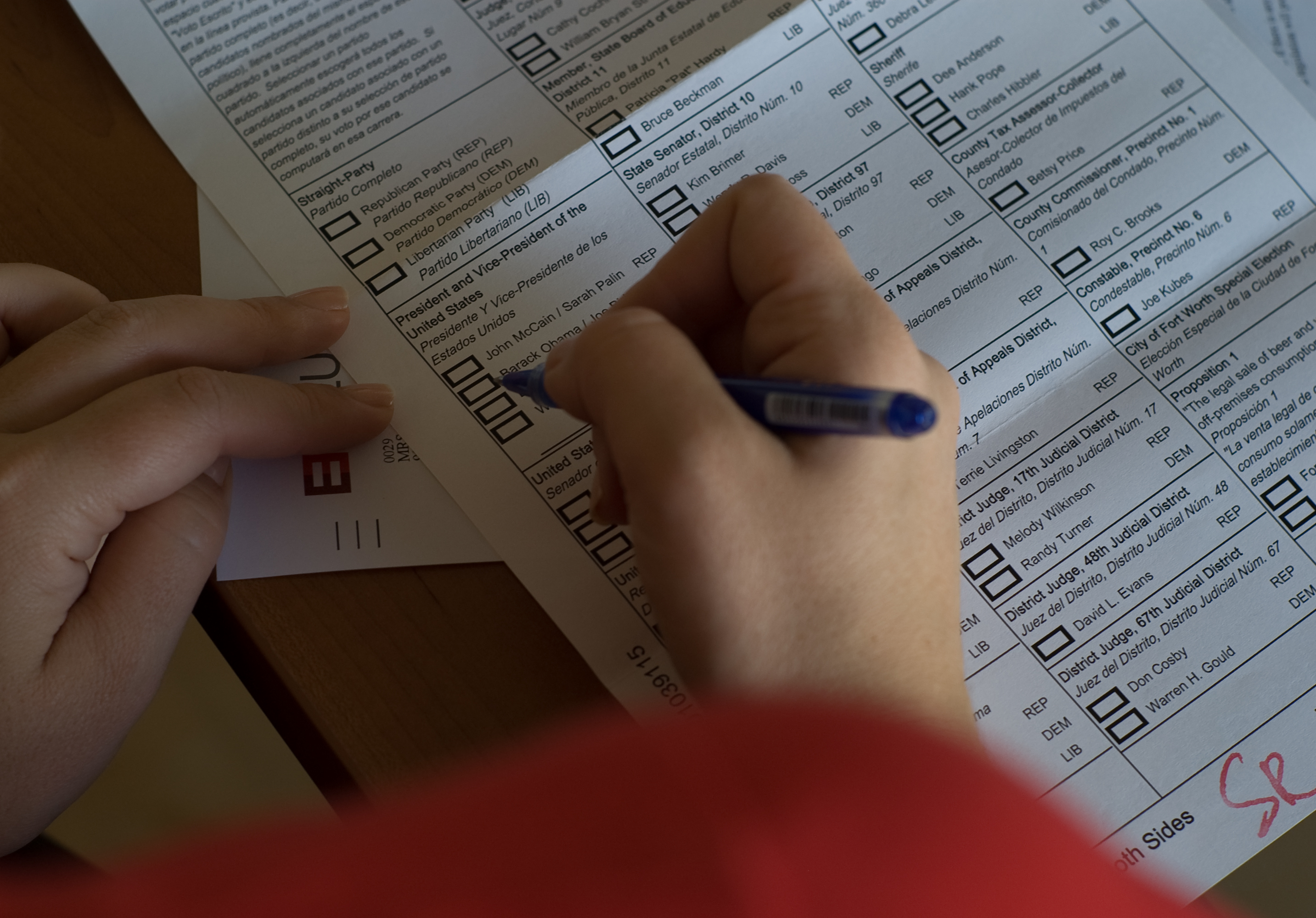
A Texas voter about to mark a selection for president on a ballot, 2008 Election Day

Under the United States Constitution, the manner of choosing electors for the Electoral College is determined by each state's legislature. Although each state designates electors by popular vote, other methods are allowed. For instance, instead of having a popular vote, a number of states used to select presidential electors by a direct vote of the state legislature itself.

However, federal law does specify that all electors must be selected on the same day, which is "the Tuesday next after the first Monday in November," i.e., a Tuesday no earlier than November 2 and no later than November 8. Today, the states and the District of Columbia each conduct their own popular elections on Election Day to help determine their respective slate of electors.

Generally, voters are required to vote on a ballot where they select the candidate of their choice. The presidential ballot is a vote "for the electors of a candidate", meaning the voter is not voting for the candidate, but endorsing a slate of electors pledged to vote for a specific presidential and vice presidential candidate.

Many voting ballots allow a voter to "blanket vote" for all candidates in a particular political party or to select individual candidates on a line by line voting system. Which candidates appear on the voting ticket is determined through a legal process known as ballot access. Usually, the size of the candidate's political party and the results of the major nomination conventions determine who is pre-listed on the presidential ballot. Thus, the presidential election ticket will not list every candidate running for president, but only those who have secured a major party nomination or whose size of their political party warrants having been formally listed. Laws allow other candidates pre-listed on a ticket, provided enough voters have endorsed that candidate, usually through a signature list.

The final way to be elected for president is to have one's name written in at the time of election as a write-in candidate. This method is used for candidates who did not fulfill the legal requirements to be pre-listed on the voting ticket. However, since a slate of electors must be associated with these candidates to vote for them (and someone for vice president) in the electoral college in the event they win the presidential election in a state, most states require a slate of electors be designated before the election in order for a write-in candidate to win, essentially meaning that most write-in votes do not count. In any event, a write-in candidate has never won an election in a state for president of the United States. Write-in votes are also used by voters to express a distaste for the listed candidates, by writing in an alternative candidate for president such as Mickey Mouse or comedian Stephen Colbert (whose application was voted down by the South Carolina Democratic Party).

Because U.S. territories are not represented in the Electoral College, U.S. citizens in those areas do not vote in the general election for president. Guam has held straw polls for president since the 1980 election to draw attention to this fact.

=== Electoral college ===
Electoral College map showing results of the 2024 U.S. presidential election. Republican Donald Trump won the popular vote in 31 states (red) and in Maine's 2nd congressional district to capture 312 electoral votes. Democrat Kamala Harris won the popular vote in 19 states (blue) plus D.C. and in Nebraska's 2nd congressional district to capture 226 electoral votes.

Most state laws establish a winner-take-all system, wherein the ticket that wins a plurality of votes wins all of that state's allocated electoral votes, and thus has their slate of electors chosen to vote in the Electoral College. Maine and Nebraska do not use this method, giving two electoral votes to the statewide winner and one electoral vote to the winner of each Congressional district instead.

Each state's winning slate of electors then meets at their respective state's capital on the first Monday after the second Wednesday in December to cast their electoral votes on separate ballots for president and vice president. Although Electoral College members can vote for anyone under the U.S. Constitution, 32 states plus the District of Columbia have laws against faithless electors, those electors who do not cast their electoral votes for the person for whom they have pledged to vote. The Supreme Court ruled unanimously in the case Chiafalo v. Washington on July 6, 2020, that the constitution does not prevent states from penalizing or replacing faithless electors.

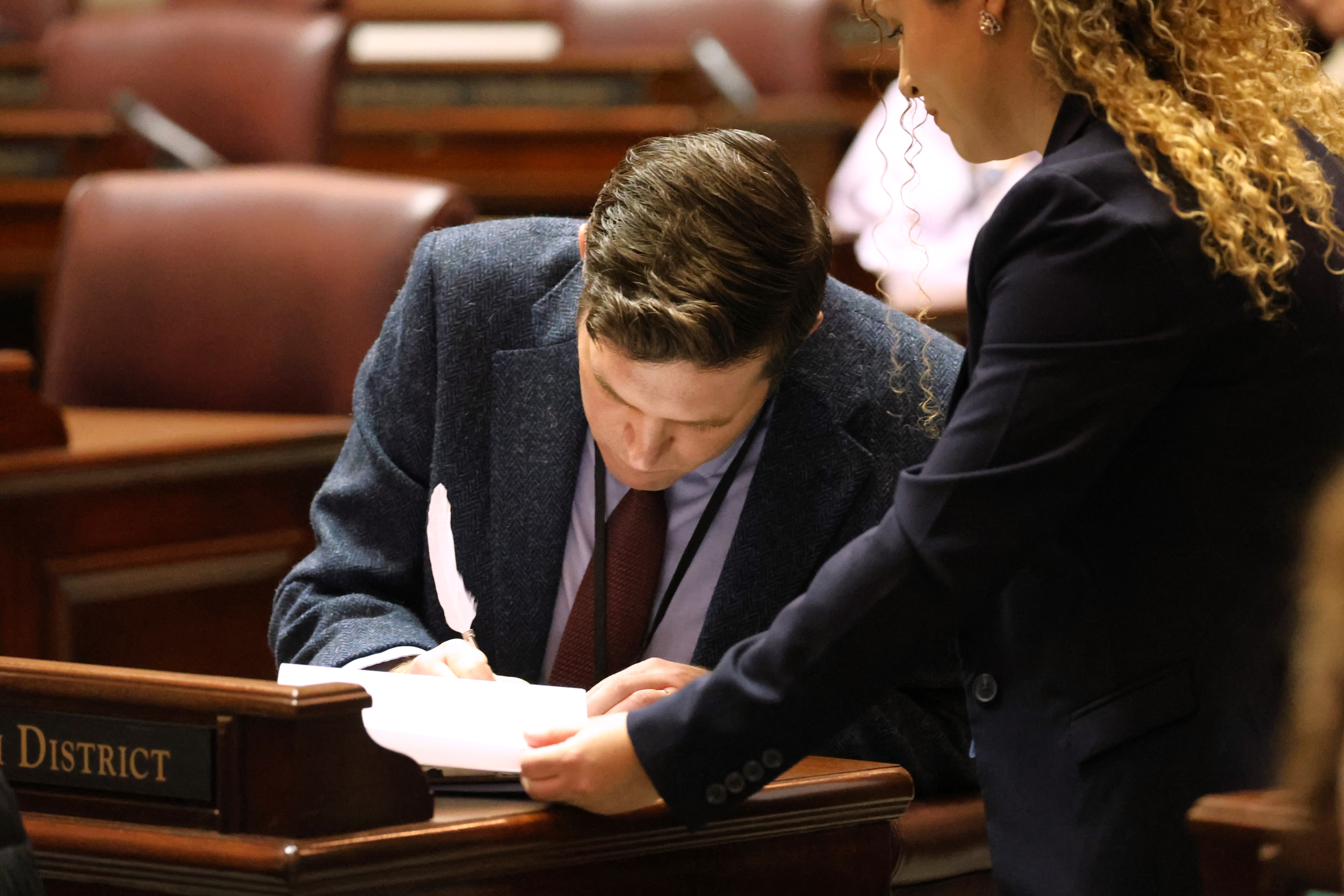
An elector from Washington state casts their ballot following the 2024 presidential election.

In early January, the total Electoral College vote count is opened by the sitting vice president, acting in his or her capacity as president of the Senate, and read aloud to a joint session of the incoming Congress, which was elected at the same time as the president. Members of Congress are free to object to any or all of a state's electoral vote count, provided that the objection is presented in writing and is signed by at least one member of each house of Congress. If such an objection is submitted, both houses of Congress adjourn to their respective chambers to debate and vote on the objection. The approval of both houses of Congress is required to invalidate those electoral votes in question.

If no candidate receives a majority of the electoral vote (at least 270), the president is determined by the rules outlined by the Twelfth Amendment. Specifically, the selection of president would then be decided by a contingent election in a ballot of the House of Representatives. For the purposes of electing the president, each state has only one vote. A ballot of the Senate is held to choose the vice president. In this ballot, each senator has one vote. The House has chosen the victor of the presidential race only twice, in 1800 and 1824; the Senate has chosen the victor of the vice-presidential race only once, in 1836.

If the president is not chosen by Inauguration Day, the vice president-elect acts as president. If neither are chosen by then, Congress by law determines who shall act as president, pursuant to the Twentieth Amendment.

Unless there are faithless electors, disputes, or other controversies, the events in December and January mentioned above are largely a formality since the winner can be determined based on the state-by-state popular vote results. Between the general election and Inauguration Day, this apparent winner is referred to as the "president-elect" (unless it is a sitting president who has won re-election).

=== Election calendar ===
The typical periods of the presidential election process are as follows, with the dates corresponding to the 2024 general election:

- Late 2022 to early 2023 – Candidates announce their intentions to run, and (if necessary) file their Statement of Candidacy with the Federal Election Commission
- June 2023 to January 2024 – Primary and caucus debates
- January to June 2024 – Primaries and caucuses
- Late May to August 2024 – Nominating conventions (including those of the minor third parties)
- September and October 2024 – Presidential election debates
- November 5, 2024 – Election Day
- December 17, 2024 – Electors cast their electoral votes
- January 6, 2025 – Congress counts and certifies the electoral votes
- January 20, 2025 - Presidential inauguration

== Trends ==
=== Previous experience ===
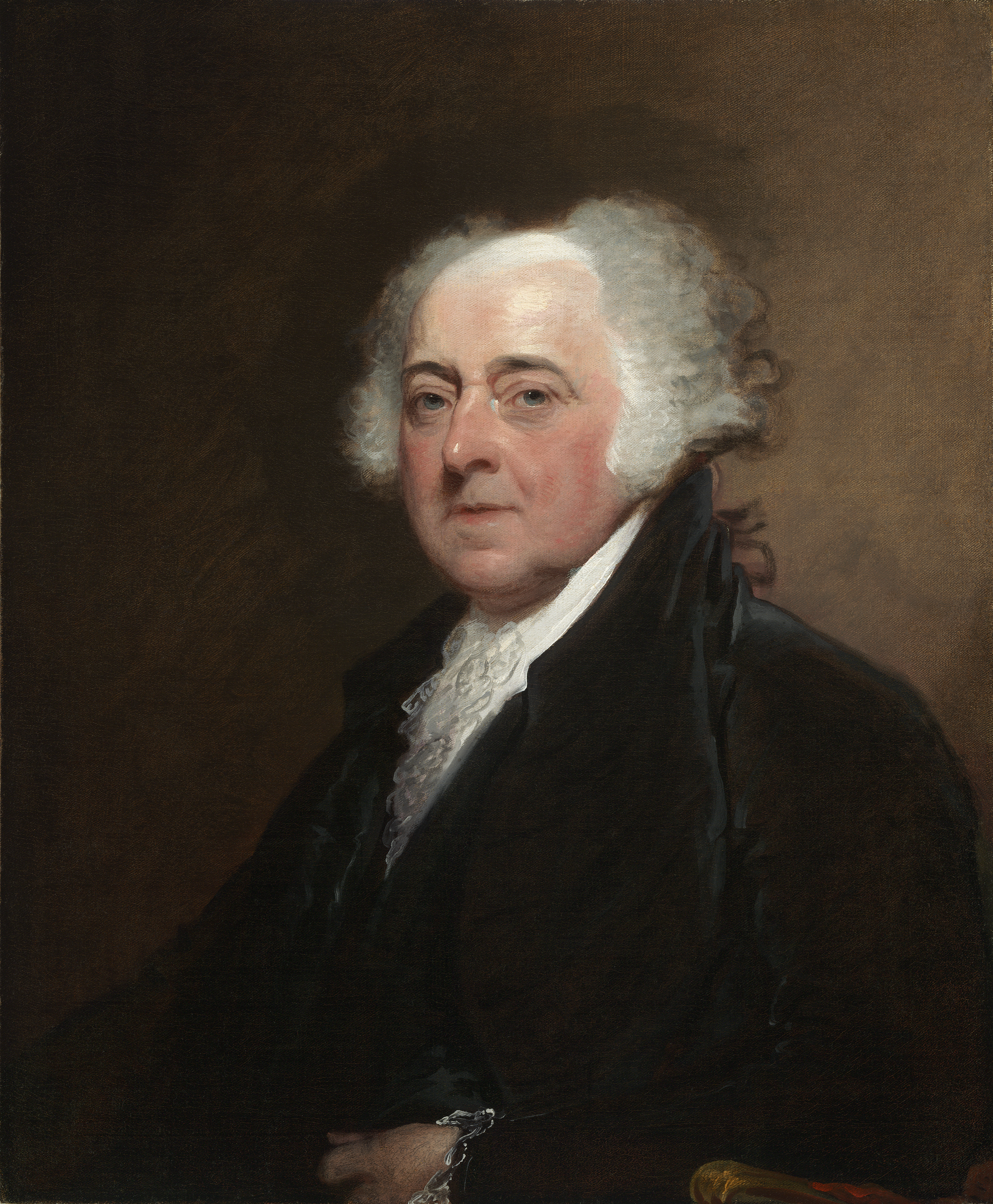
John Adams was the first of 26 presidents who have been lawyers.

Among the 45 persons who have served as president, only Donald Trump had never held a position in either government or the military prior to taking office. The only previous experience Zachary Taylor, Ulysses S. Grant, and Dwight D. Eisenhower had was in the military. Herbert Hoover previously served as the Secretary of Commerce. Everyone else served in elected public office before becoming president, such as being vice president, a member of Congress, or a state or territorial governor.

Fifteen presidents also served as vice president. Six of them – John Adams (1796), Thomas Jefferson (1800), Martin Van Buren (1836), Richard Nixon (1968), George H. W. Bush (1988), and Joe Biden (2020) – began their first term after winning an election. The remaining nine began their first term as president according to the presidential line of succession after the intra-term death or resignation of their predecessor. Of these, Theodore Roosevelt, Calvin Coolidge, Harry S. Truman, and Lyndon B. Johnson were subsequently elected to a full term of their own, while John Tyler, Millard Fillmore, Andrew Johnson, Chester A. Arthur, and Gerald Ford were not. Ford's accession to the presidency is unique in American history in that he became vice president through the process prescribed by the Twenty-fifth Amendment rather than by winning an election, thus making him the only U.S. president to not have been elected to either office.

Sixteen presidents had previously served in the U.S. Senate, including four of the five who served between 1945 and 1974. However, only three were incumbent senators at the time they were elected president (Warren G. Harding in 1920, John F. Kennedy in 1960, and Barack Obama in 2008). Eighteen presidents had earlier served in the House of Representatives. However, only one was a sitting representative when elected to the presidency (James A. Garfield in 1880).

Four of the last seven presidents (Jimmy Carter, Ronald Reagan, Bill Clinton and George W. Bush) have been governors of a state. Geographically, these presidents were from either very large states (Reagan from California, Bush from Texas) or from a state south of the Mason–Dixon line and east of Texas (Carter from Georgia, Clinton from Arkansas). In all, sixteen presidents have been former governors, including seven who were incumbent governors at the time of their election to the presidency.

The most common job experience, occupation or profession of U.S. presidents has been lawyer; 26 presidents had served as attorneys. Twenty-two presidents were also in the military. Eight presidents had served as Cabinet Secretaries, with five of the six presidents who served between 1801 and 1841 having held the office of U.S. Secretary of State.

After leaving office, one president, William Howard Taft, served as Chief Justice of the United States. Two others later served in Congress – John Quincy Adams in the House and Andrew Johnson in the Senate.

=== Technology and media ===
Lyndon B. Johnson's 1964 "Daisy" advertisement

Advances in technology and media have also affected presidential campaigns. The invention of radio and then television gave way to reliance upon national political advertisements such as Lyndon B. Johnson's 1964 "Daisy", Ronald Reagan's 1984 "Morning in America", and George H. W. Bush's 1988 "Revolving Door", all of which became major factors. In 1992, George H. W. Bush's promise of "Read my lips: no new taxes" was extensively used in the commercials of Bill Clinton and Bush's other opponents with significant effect during the campaign.

Since the development of the internet in the mid-90s, Internet activism has also become an invaluable component of presidential campaigns, especially since 2000. The internet was first used in the 1996 presidential elections, but primarily as a brochure for the candidate online. It was only used by a few candidates and there is no evidence of any major effect on the outcomes of that election cycle.

In 2000, both candidates (George W. Bush and Al Gore) created, maintained, and updated campaign websites. But it was not until the 2004 presidential election cycle was the potential value of the internet seen. By the summer of 2003, ten people competing in the 2004 presidential election had developed campaign websites. Howard Dean's campaign website from that year was considered a model for all future campaign websites. His website played a significant role in his overall campaign strategy. It allowed his supporters to read about his campaign platform and provide feedback, donate, get involved with the campaign, and connect with other supporters. A Gallup poll from January 2004 revealed that 49 percent of Americans have used the internet to get information about candidates, and 28 percent said they use the internet to get this information frequently.

Use of the Internet for grassroots fundraising by US presidential candidates such as Howard Dean, Barack Obama, Ron Paul and Bernie Sanders established it as an effective political tool. In 2016, the use of social media was a key part of Donald Trump campaign. Trump and his opinions were established as constantly "trending" by posting multiple times per day, and his strong online influence was constantly reinforced. Internet channels such as YouTube were used by candidates to share speeches and ads and to attack candidates by uploading videos of gaffes.

A study done by the Pew Internet & American Life Project in conjunction with Princeton Survey Research Associates in November 2010 shows that 54% of adults in the United States used the internet to get information about the 2010 midterm elections and about specific candidates. This represents 73% of adult internet users. The study also showed that 22 percent of adult internet users used social networking sites or Twitter to get information about and discuss the elections and 26 percent of all adults used cell phones to learn about or participate in campaigns.

E-campaigning, as it has come to be called, is subject to very little regulation. On March 26, 2006, the Federal Election Commission voted unanimously to "not regulate political communication on the Internet, including emails, blogs and the creating of Web sites". This decision made only paid political ads placed on websites subject to campaign finance limitations. A comment was made about this decision by Roger Alan Stone of Advocacy Inc. which explains this loophole in the context of a political campaign: "A wealthy individual could purchase all of the e-mail addresses for registered voters in a congressional district ... produce an Internet video ad, and e-mail it along with a link to the campaign contribution page ... Not only would this activity not count against any contribution limits or independent expenditure requirements; it would never even need to be reported."

A key part of the United States presidential campaigns is the use of media and framing. Candidates are able to frame their opponents and current issues in ways to affect the way voters will see events and the other presidential candidates. This is known as "priming". For example, during the 2016 presidential election Donald Trump successfully influenced the way voters thought about Hillary Clinton, by encouraging voters to think of Clinton as "Crooked Hillary" or a "Nasty woman". The media, and Trump, tended to focus on what was presented as her email scandal, and when voters thought about her that is what came to mind. Trump played into voters' anti-government interests, while Clinton appealed to the future of the country for the better of future children. Trump was unexpectedly successful at connecting to what a huge portion of Americans perceived as their interests. It was not always Clinton's strong point, but that may not have been her fault. Americans vote based on whether they feel the country is in a time of gain or a time of loss. Trump's campaign slogan, "Make America Great Again", made Americans feel like the country was in a time of loss, willing to take a risk on voting for a candidate without political experience. Trump was convincing with his anti-everything rhetoric, and his message reached the electorate with the help of the media. Over half of the media coverage on Trump was focused on where he stood in the race, while only 12% focused on issues, stances, and political beliefs (including problematic comments).

== Criticism ==
2012 Republican primaries and caucuses calendar.

January 2012 (4)
February 2012 (7)
March 2012 (23)
April 2012 (9)
May 2012 (7)
June 2012 (6)

2012 swing states, where the margin of victory was eight percentage points or fewer.
States won by Democrat Barack Obama by 4–8 percentage points
States won by Democrat Barack Obama by 0–4 percentage points
States won by Republican Mitt Romney by 0–4 percentage points
States won by Republican Mitt Romney by 4-8 percentage points

The presidential election process is controversial, with critics arguing that it is inherently undemocratic, and discourages voter participation and turnout in many areas of the country. Because of the staggered nature of the primary season, voters in Iowa, New Hampshire and other small states which traditionally hold their primaries and caucuses first in January usually have a major impact on the races. Campaign activity, media attention, and voter participation are usually higher in these states, as the candidates attempt to build momentum and generate a bandwagon effect in these early primaries. Conversely, voters in California and other large states which traditionally hold their primaries last in June usually end up having no say in who the presidential candidates will be. The races are usually over by then, and thus the campaigns, the media, and voters have little incentive to participate in these late primaries. As a result, more states vie for earlier primaries to claim a greater influence in the process. However, compressing the primary calendar in this way limits the ability of lesser-known candidates to effectively corral resources and raise their visibility among voters, especially when competing with better-known candidates who have more financial resources and the institutional backing of their party's establishment. Primary and caucus reform proposals include a National Primary held on a single day; or the Interregional Primary Plan, where states would be grouped into six regions, and each region would rotate every election on who would hold their primaries first.

With the primary races usually over before June, the political conventions have mostly become scripted, ceremonial affairs. As the drama has left the conventions, and complaints grown that they were scripted and dull pep rallies, public interest and viewership has fallen off. After having offered gavel-to-gavel coverage of the major party conventions in the mid-20th century, the Big Three television networks now devote only approximately three hours of coverage (one hour per night).

Critics also argue that the Electoral College is archaic and inherently undemocratic. With all states, except Maine and Nebraska, using a winner-takes-all system, most of the states' seats are allocated ina blocks to either the Democratic or the Republican candidate and in all but a few states the citizens predominantly and perennially vote for the Democratic Party or the Republican Party (and even in Maine and Nebraska, most of the state seats have historically gone to the Democratic Party or the Republican Party, respectively). This encourages presidential candidates to focus much more time, money, and energy campaigning in a few so-called "swing states", states in which no single candidate or party has overwhelming support. Such swing states (Arizona, Georgia, Michigan, Nevada, North Carolina, Pennsylvania and Wisconsin) are inundated with campaign visits, saturation television advertising, get-out-the-vote efforts by party organizers, and debates. Meanwhile, candidates and political parties have no incentive to mount nationwide campaign efforts, or work to increase voter turnout, in predominantly Democratic Party "safe states" like California, Illinois or New York or predominantly Republican Party "safe states" like Wyoming, Alabama or Utah. In practice, the winner-takes-all system also both reinforces the country's two-party system and decreases the importance of third and minor political parties. Furthermore, a candidate can win the electoral vote without securing the greatest amount of the national popular vote, such as during the 1824, 1876, 1888, 2000 and 2016 elections. It would even be possible in theory to secure the necessary 270 electoral votes from only the twelve most populous states (Note: Wins in California, Texas, Florida, New York, Illinois, Pennsylvania, Ohio, Georgia, North Carolina, Michigan, New Jersey and Virginia would secure 281 electoral votes as of the 2024 election) and ignore the rest of the country.

=== Proposed changes to the election process ===
In 1844, Representative Samuel F. Vinton of Ohio proposed an amendment to the constitution that would replace the electoral college system with a lot system. The Joint Resolution called for each state to elect, by a simple majority, a presidential candidate of said state. Each state would notify Congress of the presidential election results. Congress would then inscribe the name of every state on uniform balls, equal to the number of said state's members of Congress, and deposit into a box. In a joint session of Congress, a ball would be drawn, and the elected candidate of the state of which is written on the drawn ball would be named president. A second ball would immediately be drawn after, and that state's candidate would be named vice president. The resolution did not pass the House. Representative Vinton proposed an identical amendment in 1846. Again, it was unsuccessful. The driving force behind the introduction of the resolution is unclear, as there is no recorded debate for either proposal.

The Every Vote Counts Amendment, another proposed constitutional amendment, would replace the Electoral College with a direct popular vote, which proponents argue would increase turnout and participation. One proposal that would not require Congressional authorization is the National Popular Vote Interstate Compact, an interstate compact whereby individual participating states would agree to allocate their electors based on the winner of the national popular vote, instead of their respective statewide results.

Another proposal is for every state to adopt the District system used by Maine and Nebraska: give two electoral votes to the statewide winner and one electoral vote to the winner of each Congressional district. The Proportional Plan, often compared to the District Plan, would distribute electoral votes in each state in proportion to the popular vote, increasing the number of electors allocated to third parties.

The Automatic Plan would replace the Electors with an automatic tallying of votes to eliminate the possibility of a faithless elector affecting the outcome of the election.

The House Plan is another proposed constitutional amendment to allocate electors based on the House apportionment alone to lessen small state advantage.

== Electoral college results ==
This is a table of electoral college results. Included are candidates who received at least one electoral vote or at least five percent of the popular vote.

Faithless electors and unpledged electors are denoted by a pink background.

Year	Party	Presidential candidate	Vice presidential candidate	Popular vote	%	Electoral votes	Notes
1788-89	Independent	George Washington	None (Note: Prior to the ratification of the Twelfth Amendment, electors cast two ballots, both for President. The candidate who received a majority of electoral votes became President, and the runner-up became Vice President.)	43,782	100.0%	69 / 138	
1788-89	Federalists	John Adams (Note: Adams was elected Vice President.)	None	N/A	N/A	34 / 138	
1788-89	Federalists	John Jay	None	N/A	N/A	9 / 138	
1788-89	Federalists	Robert H. Harrison	None	N/A	N/A	6 / 138	
1788-89	Federalists	John Rutledge	None	N/A	N/A	6 / 138	
1788-89	Federalists	John Hancock	None	N/A	N/A	4 / 138	
1788-89	Anti-Federalists	George Clinton	None	N/A	N/A	3 / 138	
1788-89	Federalists	Samuel Huntington	None	N/A	N/A	2 / 138	
1788-89	Federalists	John Milton	None	N/A	N/A	2 / 138	
1788-89	Federalists	James Armstrong	None	N/A	N/A	1 / 138	
1788-89	Federalists	Benjamin Lincoln	None	N/A	N/A	1 / 138	
1788-89	Federalists	Edward Telfair	None	N/A	N/A	1 / 138	
1792	Independent	George Washington	None	28,579	100.0%	132 / 264	
1792	Federalist	John Adams	None	N/A	N/A	77 / 264	
1792	Democratic-Republican	George Clinton	None	N/A	N/A	50 / 264	
1792	Democratic-Republican	Thomas Jefferson	None	N/A	N/A	4 / 264	
1792	Democratic-Republican	Aaron Burr	None	N/A	N/A	1 / 264	
1796	Federalist	John Adams	None	35,726	53.4%	71 / 276	
1796	Democratic-Republican	Thomas Jefferson (Note: Jefferson was elected Vice President.)	None	31,115	46.6%	68 / 276	
1796	Federalist	Thomas Pinckney	None	N/A	N/A	59 / 276	
1796	Democratic-Republican	Aaron Burr	None	N/A	N/A	30 / 276	
1796	Democratic-Republican	Samuel Adams	None	N/A	N/A	15 / 276	
1796	Federalist	Oliver Ellsworth	None	N/A	N/A	11 / 276	
1796	Democratic-Republican	George Clinton	None	N/A	N/A	7 / 276	
1796	Federalist	John Jay	None	N/A	N/A	5 / 276	
1796	Federalist	James Iredell	None	N/A	N/A	3 / 276	
1796	Independent	George Washington	None	N/A	N/A	2 / 276	
1796	Democratic-Republican	John Henry	None	N/A	N/A	2 / 276	
1796	Federalist	Samuel Johnston	None	N/A	N/A	2 / 276	
1796	Federalist	Charles Cotesworth Pinckney	None	N/A	N/A	1 / 276	
1800	Democratic-Republican	Thomas Jefferson	Aaron Burr (Note: Breakdown by ticket results are available for the 1800 election.)	41,330	61.4%	73 / 276	
1800	Federalist	John Adams	Charles Cotesworth Pinckney	25,952	38.6%	64 / 276	
1800	Federalist	John Adams	John Jay	25,952	38.6%	1 / 276	
1804	Democratic-Republican	Thomas Jefferson	George Clinton	104,110	72.8%	162 / 176	
1804	Federalist	Charles Cotesworth Pinckney	Rufus King	38,919	27.2%	14 / 176	
1808	Democratic-Republican	James Madison	George Clinton	124,732	64.7%	113 / 176	(Note: In total, Madison received 122 electoral votes.)
1808	Democratic-Republican	James Madison	John Langdon	124,732	64.7%	9 / 176	(Note: In total, Madison received 122 electoral votes.)
1808	Federalist	Charles Cotesworth Pinckney	Rufus King	62,431	32.4%	47 / 176	
1808	Democratic-Republican	George Clinton	James Madison	N/A	N/A	3 / 176	(Note: Six faithless electors from New York voted for Clinton instead of Madison. Three cast their vice presidential vote for Madison, and three for Monroe.)
1808	Democratic-Republican	George Clinton	James Monroe	N/A	N/A	3 / 176	(Note: Six faithless electors from New York voted for Clinton instead of Madison. Three cast their vice presidential vote for Madison, and three for Monroe.)
1812	Democratic-Republican	James Madison	Elbridge Gerry	140,431	50.4%	128 / 217	
1812	Democratic-Republican/ Federalist (Note: While commonly labeled as the Federalist candidate, Clinton technically ran as a Democratic-Republican and was not nominated by the Federalist party itself, the latter simply deciding not to field a candidate. This did not prevent endorsements from state Federalist parties (such as in Pennsylvania), but he received the endorsement from the New York state Democratic-Republicans as well.)	DeWitt Clinton	Jared Ingersoll	132,781	47.6%	86 / 217	(Note: Three faithless electors, two from Massachusetts and one from New Hampshire, voted for Gerry for vice president instead of Ingersoll.)
1812	Democratic-Republican/ Federalist	DeWitt Clinton	Elbridge Gerry	132,781	47.6%	3 / 217	(Note: Three faithless electors, two from Massachusetts and one from New Hampshire, voted for Gerry for vice president instead of Ingersoll.)
1816	Democratic-Republican	James Monroe	Daniel D. Tompkins	76,592	68.2%	183 / 217	
1816	Federalist	Rufus King	John Eager Howard	34,740	30.9%	22 / 217	(Note: Electors from Massachusetts voted for Howard, electors from Delaware voted for Harper, and electors from Connecticut split their vote between Ross and Marshall. In total, King received 34 electoral votes.)
1816	Federalist	Rufus King	James Ross	34,740	30.9%	5 / 217	(Note: Electors from Massachusetts voted for Howard, electors from Delaware voted for Harper, and electors from Connecticut split their vote between Ross and Marshall. In total, King received 34 electoral votes.)
1816	Federalist	Rufus King	John Marshall	34,740	30.9%	4 / 217	(Note: Electors from Massachusetts voted for Howard, electors from Delaware voted for Harper, and electors from Connecticut split their vote between Ross and Marshall. In total, King received 34 electoral votes.)
1816	Federalist	Rufus King	Robert Goodloe Harper	34,740	30.9%	3 / 217	(Note: Electors from Massachusetts voted for Howard, electors from Delaware voted for Harper, and electors from Connecticut split their vote between Ross and Marshall. In total, King received 34 electoral votes.)
1820	Democratic-Republican	James Monroe	Daniel D. Tompkins	87,343	80.6%	218 / 232	(Note: Although the Federalists did not field a candidate, several Federalist electors voted for Federalist vice presidential candidates instead of Tompkins. In total, Monroe received 231 electoral votes.)
1820	Democratic-Republican	James Monroe	Richard Stockton (F)	87,343	80.6%	8 / 232	(Note: Although the Federalists did not field a candidate, several Federalist electors voted for Federalist vice presidential candidates instead of Tompkins. In total, Monroe received 231 electoral votes.)
1820	Democratic-Republican	James Monroe	Daniel Rodney (F)	87,343	80.6%	4 / 232	(Note: Although the Federalists did not field a candidate, several Federalist electors voted for Federalist vice presidential candidates instead of Tompkins. In total, Monroe received 231 electoral votes.)
1820	Democratic-Republican	James Monroe	Robert Goodloe Harper (F)	87,343	80.6%	1 / 232	(Note: Although the Federalists did not field a candidate, several Federalist electors voted for Federalist vice presidential candidates instead of Tompkins. In total, Monroe received 231 electoral votes.)
1820	Democratic-Republican	John Quincy Adams	Richard Rush (F)	N/A	N/A	1 / 232	(Note: Monroe ran unopposed, but faithless elector William Plumer of New Hampshire voted for Adams and Rush instead of Monroe and Tompkins.)
1824	Democratic-Republican (Adams faction)	John Quincy Adams (Note: Since no candidate received a majority of the electoral vote, the House of Representatives elected the president. In the House, 13 state delegations voted for Adams, seven for Jackson, and four for Crawford.)	John C. Calhoun	113,122	30.9%	74 / 261	(Note: 74 of Adams' electors voted for Calhoun, nine voted for Jackson, and one did not vote for vice president.)
1824	Democratic-Republican (Adams faction)	John Quincy Adams	Andrew Jackson	113,122	30.9%	9 / 261	(Note: 74 of Adams' electors voted for Calhoun, nine voted for Jackson, and one did not vote for vice president.)
1824	Democratic-Republican (Adams faction)	John Quincy Adams	N/A	113,122	30.9%	1 / 261	(Note: 74 of Adams' electors voted for Calhoun, nine voted for Jackson, and one did not vote for vice president.)
1824	Democratic-Republican (Jackson faction)	Andrew Jackson	John C. Calhoun	151,271	41.4%	99 / 261	
1824	Democratic-Republican (Crawford faction)	William H. Crawford	Nathaniel Macon	40,856	11.2%	24 / 261	(Note: In total, Crawford received 40 electoral votes.)
1824	Democratic-Republican (Crawford faction)	William H. Crawford	Martin Van Buren	40,856	11.2%	9 / 261	(Note: In total, Crawford received 40 electoral votes.)
1824	Democratic-Republican (Crawford faction)	William H. Crawford	John C. Calhoun	40,856	11.2%	2 / 261	(Note: In total, Crawford received 40 electoral votes.)
1824	Democratic-Republican (Crawford faction)	William H. Crawford	Henry Clay	40,856	11.2%	2 / 261	(Note: In total, Crawford received 40 electoral votes.)
1824	Democratic-Republican (Crawford faction)	William H. Crawford	Nathan Sanford	40,856	11.2%	2 / 261	(Note: In total, Crawford received 40 electoral votes.)
1824	Democratic-Republican (Crawford faction)	William H. Crawford	Andrew Jackson	40,856	11.2%	1 / 261	(Note: In total, Crawford received 40 electoral votes.)
1824	Democratic-Republican (Clay faction)	Henry Clay	Nathan Sanford	47,531	13.0%	28 / 261	(Note: In total, Clay received 38 electoral votes.)
1824	Democratic-Republican (Clay faction)	Henry Clay	John C. Calhoun	47,531	13.0%	7 / 261	(Note: In total, Clay received 38 electoral votes.)
1824	Democratic-Republican (Clay faction)	Henry Clay	Andrew Jackson	47,531	13.0%	3 / 261	(Note: In total, Clay received 38 electoral votes.)
1828	Democratic	Andrew Jackson	John C. Calhoun	642,553	56.0%	171 / 261	(Note: 7 faithless electors from Georgia voted for Smith instead of Calhoun.)
1828	Democratic	Andrew Jackson	William Smith	642,553	56.0%	7 / 261	(Note: 7 faithless electors from Georgia voted for Smith instead of Calhoun.)
1828	National Republican	John Quincy Adams	Richard Rush	500,897	43.6%	83 / 261	
1832	Democratic	Andrew Jackson	Martin Van Buren	701,780	54.2%	189 / 286	(Note: All 30 of Pennsylvania's electors voted for Wilkins instead of Van Buren. In total, Jackson received 219 electoral votes.)
1832	Democratic	Andrew Jackson	William Wilkins	701,780	54.2%	30 / 286	(Note: All 30 of Pennsylvania's electors voted for Wilkins instead of Van Buren. In total, Jackson received 219 electoral votes.)
1832	National Republican	Henry Clay	John Sergeant	484,205	37.4%	49 / 286	
1832	Nullifier	John Floyd	Henry Lee	N/A	N/A	11 / 286	(Note: All the electoral votes came from South Carolina, where the electors were chosen by the legislature and not by popular vote.)
1832	Anti-Masonic	William Wirt	Amos Ellmaker	100,715	7.8%	7 / 286	
1836	Democratic	Martin Van Buren	Richard Mentor Johnson	763,291	50.8%	147 / 294	(Note: All 23 of Virginia's electors voted for Smith for vice president instead of Johnson, which resulted in Johnson failing to obtain a majority of the electoral votes. As a result, the election went to the Senate, which elected Johnson by a vote of 33–16.)
1836	Democratic	Martin Van Buren	William Smith	763,291	50.8%	23 / 294	(Note: All 23 of Virginia's electors voted for Smith for vice president instead of Johnson, which resulted in Johnson failing to obtain a majority of the electoral votes. As a result, the election went to the Senate, which elected Johnson by a vote of 33–16.)
1836	Whig	William Henry Harrison	Francis Granger	549,907	36.6%	63 / 294	(Note: In total, Harrison received 73 electoral votes.)
1836	Whig	William Henry Harrison	John Tyler	549,907	36.6%	10 / 294	(Note: In total, Harrison received 73 electoral votes.)
1836	Whig	Hugh L. White	John Tyler	146,107	9.7%	26 / 294	
1836	Whig	Daniel Webster	Francis Granger	41,201	2.7%	14 / 294	
1836	Whig	Willie Person Mangum	John Tyler	N/A	N/A	11 / 294	
1840	Whig	William Henry Harrison	John Tyler	1,275,390	52.9%	234 / 294	
1840	Democratic	Martin Van Buren	Richard Mentor Johnson	1,128,854	46.8%	48 / 294	(Note: In total, Van Buren received 60 electoral votes.)
1840	Democratic	Martin Van Buren	Littleton W. Tazewell	1,128,854	46.8%	11 / 294	(Note: In total, Van Buren received 60 electoral votes.)
1840	Democratic	Martin Van Buren	James K. Polk	1,128,854	46.8%	1 / 294	(Note: In total, Van Buren received 60 electoral votes.)
1844	Democratic	James K. Polk	George M. Dallas	1,339,494	49.5%	170 / 275	
1844	Whig	Henry Clay	Theodore Frelinghuysen	1,300,004	48.1%	105 / 275	
1848	Whig	Zachary Taylor	Millard Fillmore	1,361,393	47.3%	163 / 290	
1848	Democratic	Lewis Cass	William Orlando Butler	1,223,460	42.5%	127 / 290	
1852	Democratic	Franklin Pierce	William R. King	1,607,510	50.8%	254 / 296	
1852	Whig	Winfield Scott	William Alexander Graham	1,386,942	43.9%	42 / 296	
1856	Democratic	James Buchanan	John C. Breckinridge	1,836,072	45.3%	174 / 296	
1856	Republican	John C. Frémont	William L. Dayton	1,342,345	33.1%	114 / 296	
1856	American	Millard Fillmore	Andrew Jackson Donelson	873,053	21.6%	8 / 296	
1860	Republican	Abraham Lincoln	Hannibal Hamlin	1,865,908	39.8%	180 / 303	
1860	Democratic (Southern)	John C. Breckinridge	Joseph Lane	848,019	18.1%	72 / 303	
1860	Constitutional Union	John Bell	Edward Everett	590,901	12.6%	39 / 303	
1860	Democratic (Northern)	Stephen A. Douglas	Herschel V. Johnson	1,380,202	29.5%	12 / 303	
1864	National Union	Abraham Lincoln (R)	Andrew Johnson (D)	2,218,388	55.0%	212 / 233	(Note: Johnson, a Democrat, was nominated on the National Union ticket along with Lincoln, a Republican.) (Note: The electoral votes of Tennessee and Louisiana were not counted. Had they been counted, Lincoln would have received 229 electoral votes.)
1864	Democratic	George B. McClellan	George H. Pendleton	1,812,807	45.0%	21 / 233	
1868	Republican	Ulysses S. Grant	Schuyler Colfax	3,013,650	52.7%	214 / 294	
1868	Democratic	Horatio Seymour	Francis Preston Blair Jr.	2,708,744	47.3%	80 / 294	
1872	Republican	Ulysses S. Grant	Henry Wilson	3,598,235	55.6%	286 / 352	
1872	Democratic	Thomas A. Hendricks	Benjamin Gratz Brown (LR)	(Note: All popular votes were originally for Horace Greeley and Benjamin Gratz Brown.)2,834,761	43.8%	41 or 42 / 352	(Note: The used sources had insufficient data to determine the pairings of four electoral votes in Missouri. Therefore, the possible tickets are listed with the minimum and maximum possible number of electoral votes each.) (Note: In total, Hendricks received 42 electoral votes.)
1872	Democratic	Thomas A. Hendricks	William S. Groesbeck	2,834,761	43.8%	0 or 1 / 352	(Note: The used sources had insufficient data to determine the pairings of four electoral votes in Missouri. Therefore, the possible tickets are listed with the minimum and maximum possible number of electoral votes each.) (Note: In total, Hendricks received 42 electoral votes.)
1872	Democratic	Thomas A. Hendricks	George Washington Julian (LR)	2,834,761	43.8%	0 or 1 / 352	(Note: The used sources had insufficient data to determine the pairings of four electoral votes in Missouri. Therefore, the possible tickets are listed with the minimum and maximum possible number of electoral votes each.) (Note: In total, Hendricks received 42 electoral votes.)
1872	Democratic	Thomas A. Hendricks	John M. Palmer (LR)	2,834,761	43.8%	0 or 1 / 352	(Note: The used sources had insufficient data to determine the pairings of four electoral votes in Missouri. Therefore, the possible tickets are listed with the minimum and maximum possible number of electoral votes each.) (Note: In total, Hendricks received 42 electoral votes.)
1872	Liberal Republican	Benjamin Gratz Brown	Alfred H. Colquitt (D)	2,834,761	43.8%	5 / 352	
1872	Liberal Republican	Benjamin Gratz Brown	George Washington Julian	2,834,761	43.8%	4 or 5 / 352	
1872	Liberal Republican	Benjamin Gratz Brown	Thomas E. Bramlette (D)	2,834,761	43.8%	3 / 352	
1872	Liberal Republican	Benjamin Gratz Brown	John M. Palmer	2,834,761	43.8%	2 or 3 / 352	
1872	Liberal Republican	Benjamin Gratz Brown	Nathaniel P. Banks	2,834,761	43.8%	1 / 352	
1872	Liberal Republican	Benjamin Gratz Brown	Willis Benson Machen (D)	2,834,761	43.8%	1 / 352	
1872	Liberal Republican	Benjamin Gratz Brown	William S. Groesbeck (D)	2,834,761	43.8%	0 or 1 / 352	
1872	Liberal Republican	Horace Greeley	Benjamin Gratz Brown	2,834,761	43.8%	3 / 352	(Note: Greeley died before the Electoral College voted; as a result the electoral vote intended for Greeley and Brown went to several other candidates.)
1872	Democratic	Charles J. Jenkins	Benjamin Gratz Brown	2,834,761	43.8%	2 / 352	
1872	Liberal Republican	David Davis	Benjamin Gratz Brown	2,834,761	43.8%	0 or 1 / 352	(Note: In total, Davis received one electoral vote.)
1872	Liberal Republican	David Davis	William S. Groesbeck (D)	2,834,761	43.8%	0 or 1 / 352	(Note: In total, Davis received one electoral vote.)
1872	Liberal Republican	David Davis	George Washington Julian	2,834,761	43.8%	0 or 1 / 352	(Note: In total, Davis received one electoral vote.)
1872	Liberal Republican	David Davis	John M. Palmer	2,834,761	43.8%	0 or 1 / 352	(Note: In total, Davis received one electoral vote.)
1876	Republican	Rutherford B. Hayes	William A. Wheeler	4,034,142	47.9%	185 / 369	
1876	Democratic	Samuel J. Tilden	Thomas A. Hendricks	4,286,808	50.9%	184 / 369	
1880	Republican	James A. Garfield	Chester A. Arthur	4,446,158	48.3%	214 / 369	
1880	Democratic	Winfield Scott Hancock	William Hayden English	4,444,260	48.3%	155 / 369	
1884	Democratic	Grover Cleveland	Thomas A. Hendricks	4,914,482	48.9%	219 / 401	
1884	Republican	James G. Blaine	John A. Logan	4,856,903	48.3%	182 / 401	
1888	Republican	Benjamin Harrison	Levi P. Morton	5,443,892	47.8%	233 / 401	
1888	Democratic	Grover Cleveland	Allen G. Thurman	5,534,488	48.6%	168 / 401	
1892	Democratic	Grover Cleveland	Adlai Stevenson I	5,553,898	46.0%	277 / 444	
1892	Republican	Benjamin Harrison	Whitelaw Reid	5,190,819	43.0%	145 / 444	
1892	Populist	James B. Weaver	James G. Field	1,026,595	8.5%	22 / 444	
1896	Republican	William McKinley	Garret Hobart	7,111,607	51.0%	271 / 447	
1896	Democratic/Populist	William Jennings Bryan	Arthur Sewall (D)	6,509,052	46.7%	149 / 447	(Note: While the Democrats and Populists both nominated Bryan, the two parties had different vice presidential running mates.)
1896	Democratic/Populist	William Jennings Bryan	Thomas E. Watson (Pop.)	6,509,052	46.7%	27 / 447	(Note: While the Democrats and Populists both nominated Bryan, the two parties had different vice presidential running mates.)
1900	Republican	William McKinley	Theodore Roosevelt	7,228,864	51.6%	292 / 447	
1900	Democratic	William Jennings Bryan	Adlai Stevenson I	6,370,932	45.5%	155 / 447	
1904	Republican	Theodore Roosevelt	Charles W. Fairbanks	7,630,457	56.4%	336 / 476	
1904	Democratic	Alton B. Parker	Henry G. Davis	5,083,880	37.6%	140 / 476	
1908	Republican	William Howard Taft	James S. Sherman	7,678,335	51.6%	321 / 483	
1908	Democratic	William Jennings Bryan	John W. Kern	6,408,979	43.0%	162 / 483	
1912	Democratic	Woodrow Wilson	Thomas R. Marshall	6,296,284	41.8%	435 / 531	
1912	Progressive	Theodore Roosevelt	Hiram Johnson	4,122,721	27.4%	88 / 531	
1912	Republican	William Howard Taft	Nicholas Murray Butler (Note: Butler replaced Sherman, who died before the election was held.)	3,486,242	23.2%	8 / 531	
1916	Democratic	Woodrow Wilson	Thomas R. Marshall	9,126,868	49.2%	277 / 531	
1916	Republican	Charles Evans Hughes	Charles W. Fairbanks	8,548,728	46.1%	254 / 531	
1920	Republican	Warren G. Harding	Calvin Coolidge	16,144,093	60.3%	404 / 531	
1920	Democratic	James M. Cox	Franklin D. Roosevelt	9,139,661	34.2%	127 / 531	
1924	Republican	Calvin Coolidge	Charles G. Dawes	15,723,789	54.0%	382 / 531	
1924	Democratic	John W. Davis	Charles W. Bryan	8,386,242	28.8%	136 / 531	
1924	Progressive	Robert M. La Follette	Burton K. Wheeler	4,831,706	16.6%	13 / 531	
1928	Republican	Herbert Hoover	Charles Curtis	21,427,123	58.2%	444 / 531	
1928	Democratic	Al Smith	Joseph Taylor Robinson	15,015,464	40.8%	87 / 531	
1932	Democratic	Franklin D. Roosevelt	John Nance Garner	22,821,277	57.4%	472 / 531	
1932	Republican	Herbert Hoover	Charles Curtis	15,761,254	39.7%	59 / 531	
1936	Democratic	Franklin D. Roosevelt	John Nance Garner	27,752,648	60.8%	523 / 531	
1936	Republican	Alf Landon	Frank Knox	16,681,862	36.5%	8 / 531	
1940	Democratic	Franklin D. Roosevelt	Henry A. Wallace	27,313,945	54.7%	449 / 531	
1940	Republican	Wendell Willkie	Charles L. McNary	22,347,744	44.8%	82 / 531	
1944	Democratic	Franklin D. Roosevelt	Harry S. Truman	25,612,916	53.4%	432 / 531	
1944	Republican	Thomas E. Dewey	John W. Bricker	22,017,929	45.9%	99 / 531	
1948	Democratic	Harry S. Truman	Alben W. Barkley	24,179,347	49.6%	303 / 531	
1948	Republican	Thomas E. Dewey	Earl Warren	21,991,292	45.1%	189 / 531	
1948	Dixiecrat	Strom Thurmond	Fielding L. Wright	1,175,930	2.4%	39 / 531	
1952	Republican	Dwight D. Eisenhower	Richard Nixon	34,075,529	55.2%	442 / 531	
1952	Democratic	Adlai Stevenson II	John Sparkman	27,375,090	44.3%	89 / 531	
1956	Republican	Dwight D. Eisenhower	Richard Nixon	35,579,180	57.4%	457 / 531	
1956	Democratic	Adlai Stevenson II	Estes Kefauver	26,028,028	42.0%	73 / 531	
1956	Democratic	Walter Burgwyn Jones	Herman Talmadge	N/A	N/A	1 / 531	(Note: W. F. Turner, a faithless elector from Alabama, voted for Jones and Talmadge instead of Stevenson and Kefauver.)
1960	Democratic	John F. Kennedy	Lyndon B. Johnson	34,220,984	49.7%	303 / 537	
1960	Republican	Richard Nixon	Henry Cabot Lodge Jr.	34,108,157	49.6%	219 / 537	
1960	Southern Democratic	Harry F. Byrd	Strom Thurmond	610,409	0.4%	14 / 537	(Note: Unpledged electors voted for Byrd and Thurmond. Henry D. Irwin, a faithless elector from Oklahoma, cast his vote for Byrd and Goldwater instead of Nixon and Lodge.)
1960	Southern Democratic	Harry F. Byrd	Barry Goldwater (R)	610,409	0.4%	1 / 537	(Note: Unpledged electors voted for Byrd and Thurmond. Henry D. Irwin, a faithless elector from Oklahoma, cast his vote for Byrd and Goldwater instead of Nixon and Lodge.)
1964	Democratic	Lyndon B. Johnson	Hubert Humphrey	43,127,041	61.0%	486 / 538	
1964	Republican	Barry Goldwater	William E. Miller	27,175,754	38.5%	52 / 538	
1968	Republican	Richard Nixon	Spiro Agnew	31,783,783	43.4%	301 / 538	
1968	Democratic	Hubert Humphrey	Edmund Muskie	31,271,839	42.7%	191 / 538	
1968	American Independent	George Wallace	Curtis LeMay	9,901,118	13.5%	46 / 538	
1972	Republican	Richard Nixon	Spiro Agnew	47,168,710	60.7%	520 / 538	
1972	Democratic	George McGovern	Sargent Shriver	29,173,222	37.5%	17 / 538	
1972	Libertarian	John Hospers	Tonie Nathan	3,674	<0.01%	1 / 538	(Note: Faithless elector Roger MacBride of Virginia voted for Hospers and Nathan instead of Nixon and Agnew.)
1976	Democratic	Jimmy Carter	Walter Mondale	40,831,881	50.1%	297 / 538	
1976	Republican	Gerald Ford	Bob Dole	39,148,634	48.0%	240 / 538	
1976	Republican	Ronald Reagan	Bob Dole	N/A	N/A	1 / 538	(Note: Mike Padden, a faithless elector from Washington, voted for Reagan instead of Ford. He voted for Dole, however, as pledged.)
1980	Republican	Ronald Reagan	George H. W. Bush	43,903,230	50.7%	489 / 538	
1980	Democratic	Jimmy Carter	Walter Mondale	35,480,115	41.0%	49 / 538	
1984	Republican	Ronald Reagan	George H. W. Bush	54,455,472	58.8%	525 / 538	
1984	Democratic	Walter Mondale	Geraldine Ferraro	37,577,352	40.6%	13 / 538	
1988	Republican	George H. W. Bush	Dan Quayle	48,886,597	53.4%	426 / 538	
1988	Democratic	Michael Dukakis	Lloyd Bentsen	41,809,476	45.6%	111 / 538	
1988	Democratic	Lloyd Bentsen	Michael Dukakis	N/A	N/A	1 / 538	(Note: Faithless elector Margarette Leach of West Virginia voted for Bentsen for president and Dukakis for vice president, instead of Dukakis for president and Bentsen for vice president.)
1992	Democratic	Bill Clinton	Al Gore	44,909,806	43.0%	370 / 538	
1992	Republican	George H. W. Bush	Dan Quayle	39,104,550	37.4%	168 / 538	
1996	Democratic	Bill Clinton	Al Gore	47,401,185	49.2%	379 / 538	
1996	Republican	Bob Dole	Jack Kemp	39,197,469	40.7%	159 / 538	
2000	Republican	George W. Bush	Dick Cheney	50,456,002	47.9%	271 / 538	
2000	Democratic	Al Gore	Joe Lieberman	50,999,897	48.4%	266 / 538	(Note: One of the D.C. electors pledged to Gore-Lieberman abstained from the final vote.)
2004	Republican	George W. Bush	Dick Cheney	62,040,610	50.7%	286 / 538	
2004	Democratic	John Kerry	John Edwards	59,028,444	48.3%	251 / 538	
2004	Democratic	John Edwards	John Edwards	5	<0.01%	1 / 538	(Note: One anonymous faithless elector from Minnesota voted for Edwards for both president and vice president.)
2008	Democratic	Barack Obama	Joe Biden	69,498,516	52.9%	365 / 538	
2008	Republican	John McCain	Sarah Palin	59,948,323	45.7%	173 / 538	
2012	Democratic	Barack Obama	Joe Biden	65,915,795	51.1%	332 / 538	
2012	Republican	Mitt Romney	Paul Ryan	60,933,504	47.2%	206 / 538	
2016	Republican	Donald Trump	Mike Pence	62,984,828	46.1%	304 / 538	
2016	Republican	Ron Paul (L)	Mike Pence	124	<0.01%	1 / 538	(Note: 1 faithless electoral vote from Texas.)
2016	Democratic	Hillary Clinton	Tim Kaine	65,853,514	48.2%	227 / 538	
2016	Republican (cast by Democratic electors)	Colin Powell	Susan Collins	25	<0.01%	1 / 538	(Note: 3 faithless electoral votes from Washington.)
2016	Republican (cast by Democratic electors)	Colin Powell	Maria Cantwell (D)	25	<0.01%	1 / 538	(Note: 3 faithless electoral votes from Washington.)
2016	Republican (cast by Democratic electors)	Colin Powell	Elizabeth Warren (D)	25	<0.01%	1 / 538	(Note: 3 faithless electoral votes from Washington.)
2016	Republican	John Kasich	Carly Fiorina	2,684	<0.01%	1 / 538	
2016	Democratic	Bernie Sanders	Elizabeth Warren	108,776	0.08%	1 / 538	(Note: 1 faithless electoral vote from Hawaii.)
2016	Democratic	Faith Spotted Eagle	Winona LaDuke (G)	N/A	N/A	1 / 538	(Note: 1 faithless electoral vote from Washington.)
2020	Democratic	Joe Biden	Kamala Harris	81,283,501	51.3%	306 / 538	
2020	Republican	Donald Trump	Mike Pence	74,223,975	46.9%	232 / 538	
2024	Republican	Donald Trump	JD Vance	77,302,169	49.8%	312 / 538	
2024	Democratic	Kamala Harris	Tim Walz	75,015,834	48.3%	226 / 538	

=== Maps of results ===
Electoral College

1788–1789 Election

1792 Election

1796 Election

1800 Election

1804 Election

1808 Election

1812 Election

1816 Election

1820 Election

1824 Election

1828 Election

1832 Election

1836 Election

1840 Election

1844 Election

1848 Election

1852 Election

1856 Election

1860 Election

1864 Election

1868 Election

1872 Election

1876 Election

1880 Election

1884 Election

1888 Election

1892 Election

1896 Election

1900 Election

1904 Election

1908 Election

1912 Election

1916 Election

1920 Election

1924 Election

1928 Election

1932 Election

1936 Election

1940 Election

1944 Election

1948 Election

1952 Election

1956 Election

1960 Election

1964 Election

1968 Election

1972 Election

1976 Election

1980 Election

1984 Election

1988 Election

1992 Election

1996 Election

2000 Election

2004 Election

2008 Election

2012 Election

2016 Election

2020 Election

2024 Election

== Popular vote results ==
Historically, presidents seeking re-election with a job approval rating of 50 percent or higher among American voters have easily won a second term, while those with an approval rating of less than 50 percent have lost the election.

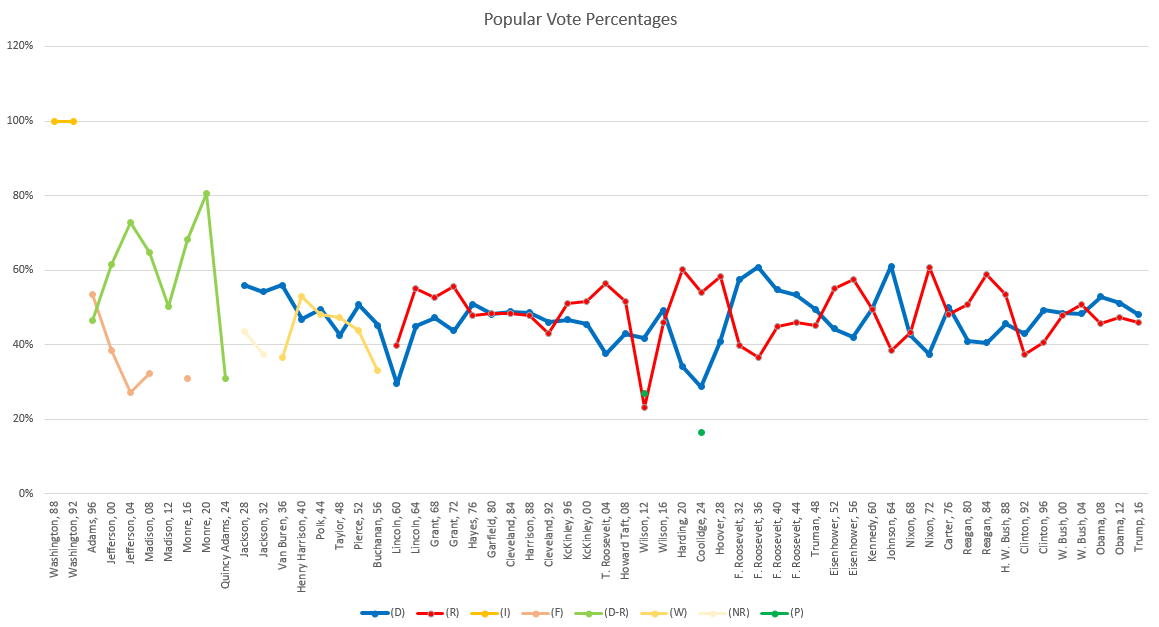
Popular vote percentage

1788–89 United States presidential election
Party	Candidate	Votes	%
Independent	George Washington	43,782	100%
Federalist	John Adams (vice president) (Note: Until the 1804 election following the Twelfth Amendment to the United States Constitution, the runner-up in a presidential election became the vice president.)	n/a	n/a
Federalist	John Jay	n/a	n/a
Federalist	Robert H. Harrison	n/a	n/a
Federalist	John Rutledge	n/a	n/a
Federalist	John Hancock	n/a	n/a
Anti-Administration	George Clinton	n/a	n/a
Federalist	Samuel Huntington	n/a	n/a
Federalist	John Milton	n/a	n/a
Federalist	James Armstrong	n/a	n/a
Federalist	Benjamin Lincoln	n/a	n/a
Federalist	Edward Telfair	n/a	n/a

1792 United States presidential election
Party	Candidate	Votes	%
Independent	George Washington	28,579	100%
Federalist	John Adams (vice president)	n/a	n/a
Democratic-Republican	George Clinton	n/a	n/a
Democratic-Republican	Thomas Jefferson	n/a	n/a
Democratic-Republican	Aaron Burr	n/a	n/a

1796 United States presidential election
Party	Candidate	Votes	%
Federalist	John Adams	35,726	53.4%
Democratic-Republican	Thomas Jefferson (vice president)	31,115	46.5%
Democratic-Republican	Aaron Burr	n/a	n/a
Democratic-Republican	Samuel Adams	n/a	n/a
Federalist	Oliver Ellsworth	n/a	n/a
Democratic-Republican	George Clinton	n/a	n/a
Federalist	John Jay	n/a	n/a
Federalist	James Iredell	n/a	n/a
Independent	George Washington	n/a	n/a
Democratic-Republican	John Henry	n/a	n/a
Federalist	Samuel Johnston	n/a	n/a
Federalist	Charles Cotesworth Pinckney	n/a	n/a

1800 United States presidential election
Party	Candidate	Votes	%
Democratic-Republican	Thomas Jefferson/Aaron Burr	41,330	61.4%
Federalist	John Adams/Charles Cotesworth Pinckney	25,952	38.6%
Federalist	John Adams/John Jay	0	0%

House vote for president, 1801
CT	DE	GA	KY	MD	MA	NH	NJ	NY	NC	PA	RI	SC	TN	VT	VA
0-7	0-0-1	1-0	2-0	4-0-4	3-11	0-4	3-2	6-4	6-4	9-4	0-2	0-0-4	1-0	1-0-1	14–5
State delegations won by Jefferson are color coded in green, and those won by Burr in red. Vote results listed in that order, with abstentions at end.

1804 United States presidential election
Party	Candidate	Votes	%
Democratic-Republican	Thomas Jefferson/George Clinton	104,110	72.8%
Federalist	Charles Cotesworth Pinckney/Rufus King	38,919	27.2%

1808 United States presidential election
Party	Candidate	Votes	%
Democratic-Republican	James Madison/George Clinton	124,732	64.7%
Federalist	Charles Cotesworth Pinckney/Rufus King	62,431	32.4%
Democratic-Republican	James Monroe	4,848	2.5%
Democratic-Republican	George Clinton/James Madison and James Monroe	0	0%
None	Unpledged electors	680	0.4%

1812 United States presidential election
Party	Candidate	Votes	%
Democratic-Republican	James Madison/Elbridge Gerry	140,431	50.4%
Democratic-Republican	DeWitt Clinton (Note: While commonly labeled as the Federalist candidate, Clinton technically ran as a Democratic-Republican and was not nominated by the Federalist party itself, the latter simply deciding not to field a candidate. This did not prevent endorsements from state Federalist parties (such as in Pennsylvania), but he received the endorsement from the New York state Democratic-Republicans as well.)/Jared Ingersoll and Elbridge Gerry	132,781	47.6%
Federalist	Rufus King	5,574	2.0%

1816 United States presidential election
Party	Candidate	Votes	%
Democratic-Republican	James Monroe/Daniel D. Tompkins	76,592	68.2%
Federalist	Rufus King/Multiple	34,740	30.9%
None	Unpledged electors	1,038	0.9%

1820 United States presidential election
Party	Candidate	Votes	%
Democratic-Republican	James Monroe/Daniel D. Tompkins	87,343	80.6%
Federalist	No candidate	17,465	16.12%
Democratic-Republican	John Quincy Adams/Richard Rush (Federalist)	2,215	2.04%
Democratic-Republican	DeWitt Clinton	1,893	1.75%
Independent	Unpledged electors	1,658	1.53%

1824 United States presidential election
Party	Candidate	Votes	%
Democratic-Republican	John Quincy Adams/John C. Calhoun and Andrew Jackson (Note: Lost the popular vote but won the presidency through the Electoral College.)	113,122	30.9%
Democratic-Republican	Andrew Jackson/John C. Calhoun	151,271	41.4%
Democratic-Republican	William H. Crawford/Multiple	40,856	11.2%
Democratic-Republican	Henry Clay/Multiple	47,531	13%
None	Unpledged electors	6,616	1.81%

This election was in many ways unique in American history: several different factions of the Democratic-Republican Party were named after the last names of the candidates in this race, and nominated their own candidates. As no candidate received a majority of electoral votes, the House of Representatives chose Adams to be president.

House vote for president, 1824
AL	CT	DE	GA	IL	IN	KY	LA	ME	MD	MA	MS	MO	NH	NJ	NY	NC	OH	PN	RI	SC	TN	VT	VA
0-3-0	6-0-0	0-0-1	0-0-7	1-0-0	0-3-0	8-4-0	2-1-0	7-0-0	5-3-1	12-1-0	0-1-0	1-0-0	6-0-0	1-5-0	18-2-14	1-1-10	10-2-2	1-25-0	2-0-0	0-9-0	0-9-0	5-0-0	1–1–19
State delegations that Adams won are colored in green, blue for Jackson, and orange for Crawford. Vote results listed in that order.

1828 United States presidential election
Party	Candidate	Votes	%
Democratic	Andrew Jackson/John C. Calhoun	642,553	56.0%
National Republican	John Quincy Adams/Richard Rush	500,897	43.6%

1832 United States presidential election
Party	Candidate	Votes	%
Democratic	Andrew Jackson/Martin Van Buren	701,780	54.2%
National Republican	Henry Clay/John Sergeant	484,205	37.4%
Nullifier	John Floyd/Henry Lee	0	0%
Anti-Masonic	William Wirt/Amos Ellmaker	100,715	7.8%

1836 United States presidential election
Party	Candidate	Votes	%
Democratic	Martin Van Buren/Richard Mentor Johnson	764,176	56.0%
Whig	William Henry Harrison/Francis Granger	549,907	36.6%
Whig	Hugh Lawson White/John Tyler	146,107	9.7%
Whig	Daniel Webster/Francis Granger	41,201	2.7%
Whig	Willie Person Mangum/John Tyler	0	0%

1840 United States presidential election
Party	Candidate	Votes	%
Whig	William Henry Harrison/John Tyler	1,275,390	52.9%
Democratic	Martin Van Buren/Richard Mentor Johnson	1,128,854	46.8%
Liberty	James G. Birney/Thomas Earle	7,453	0.31%

1844 United States presidential election
Party	Candidate	Votes	%
Democratic	James K. Polk/George M. Dallas	1,339,494	49.5%
Whig	Henry Clay/Theodore Frelinghuysen	1,300,004	48.1%
Liberty	James G. Birney/Thomas Morris	62,103	2.30%

1848 United States presidential election
Party	Candidate	Votes	%
Whig	Zachary Taylor/Millard Fillmore	1,361,393	47.3%
Democratic	Lewis Cass/William Orlando Butler	1,223,460	42.5%
Free Soil	Martin Van Buren/Charles Francis Adams Sr.	291,501	10.1%
Liberty	Gerrit Smith/Charles C. Foote	2,545	0.09%

1852 United States presidential election
Party	Candidate	Votes	%
Democratic	Franklin Pierce/William R. King	1,607,510	50.8%
Whig	Winfield Scott/William Alexander Graham	1,386,942	43.9%
Free Soil	John P. Hale/George Washington Julian	155,210	4.9%
Union	Daniel Webster/Charles J. Jenkins	6,994	0.22%
Know Nothing	Jacob Broom/Reynell Coates	2,566	0.08%
Southern Rights	George Troup/John A. Quitman	2,331	0.07%

1856 United States presidential election
Party	Candidate	Votes	%
Democratic	James Buchanan/John C. Breckinridge	1,836,072	45.3%
Republican	John C. Frémont/William L. Dayton	1,342,345	33.1%
Know Nothing	Millard Fillmore/Andrew Jackson Donelson	873,053	21.6%

1860 United States presidential election
Party	Candidate	Votes	%
Republican	Abraham Lincoln/Hannibal Hamlin	1,865,908	39.8%
Southern Democratic	John C. Breckinridge/Joseph Lane	848,019	18.1%
Constitutional Union	John Bell/Edward Everett	590,901	12.6%
Democratic	Stephen A. Douglas/Herschel V. Johnson	1,380,202	29.5%

1864 United States presidential election
Party	Candidate	Votes	%
National Union	Abraham Lincoln/Andrew Johnson	2,218,388	55.0%
Democratic	George B. McClellan/George H. Pendleton	1,812,807	45.0%

1868 United States presidential election
Party	Candidate	Votes	%
Republican	Ulysses S. Grant/Schuyler Colfax	3,013,650	52.7%
Democratic	Horatio Seymour/Francis Preston Blair Jr.	2,708,744	47.3%

1872 United States presidential election
Party	Candidate	Votes	%
Republican	Ulysses S. Grant/Henry Wilson	3,598,235	55.6%
Liberal Republican	Horace Greeley/Benjamin Gratz Brown	2,834,761	43.8%
Straight-Out Democrats	Charles O'Conor/John Quincy Adams II	18,602	0.3%
Prohibition	James Black/John Russell	5,607	0.1%

1876 United States presidential election
Party	Candidate	Votes	%
Republican	Rutherford B. Hayes/William A. Wheeler	4,034,142	47.9%
Democratic	Samuel J. Tilden/Thomas A. Hendricks	4,286,808	50.9%
Greenback	Peter Cooper/Samuel Fenton Cary	83,726	0.99%
Prohibition	Green Clay Smith/Gideon T. Stewart	6,945	0.08%
National	James Walker/Donald Kirkpatrick	463	0.01%

1880 United States presidential election
Party	Candidate	Votes	%
Republican	James A. Garfield/Chester A. Arthur	4,446,158	48.3%
Democratic	Winfield Scott Hancock/William Hayden English	4,444,260	48.3%
Greenback	James B. Weaver/Barzillai J. Chambers	308,649	3.35%
Prohibition	Neal Dow/Henry Adams Thompson	10,364	0.11%
Anti-Masonic	John W. Phelps/Samuel C. Pomeroy	1,045	0.01%

1884 United States presidential election
Party	Candidate	Votes	%
Democratic	Grover Cleveland/Thomas A. Hendricks	4,914,482	48.9%
Republican	James G. Blaine/John A. Logan	4,856,903	48.3%
Prohibition	John St. John/William Daniel	147,482	1.50%
Anti-Monopoly	Benjamin Butler/Absolom M. West	134,294	1.33%
National Equal Rights Party	Belva Ann Lockwood/Marietta Stow	4,194	0.04%

1888 United States presidential election
Party	Candidate	Votes	%
Republican	Benjamin Harrison/Levi P. Morton	5,443,892	47.8%
Democratic	Grover Cleveland/Allen G. Thurman	5,534,488	48.6%
Prohibition	Clinton B. Fisk/John A. Brooks	249,819	2.20%
Labor	Alson Streeter/Charles E. Cunningham	146,602	1.31%

1892 United States presidential election
Party	Candidate	Votes	%
Democratic	Grover Cleveland/Adlai Stevenson I	5,553,898	46%
Republican	Benjamin Harrison/Whitelaw Reid	5,190,819	43%
Populist	James B. Weaver/James G. Field	1,026,595	8.5%
Prohibition	John Bidwell/James Cranfill	270,879	2.24%
Socialist Labor	Simon Wing/Charles Matchett	21,173	0.18%

1896 United States presidential election
Party	Candidate	Votes	%
Republican	William McKinley/Garret Hobart	7,111,607	51%
Democratic	William Jennings Bryan/Arthur Sewall	6,509,052	46.7%
National Democratic	John M. Palmer/Simon Bolivar Buckner	134,645	0.97%
Prohibition	Joshua Levering/Hale Johnson	131,312	0.94%
Socialist Labor	Charles H. Matchett/Matthew Maguire	36,373	0.26%
National Prohibition Party	Charles Eugene Bentley/James H. Southgate	13,968	0.10%

1900 United States presidential election
Party	Candidate	Votes	%
Republican	William McKinley/Theodore Roosevelt	7,228,864	51.6%
Democratic	William Jennings Bryan/Adlai Stevenson I	6,370,932	45.5%
Prohibition	John G. Woolley/Henry B. Metcalf	210,864	1.51%
Social Democratic	Eugene V. Debs/Job Harriman	87,945	0.63%
Populist	Wharton Barker/Ignatius L. Donnelly	50,989	0.36%
Socialist Labor	Joseph F. Malloney/Valentine Remmel	40,943	0.29%

1904 United States presidential election
Party	Candidate	Votes	%
Republican	Theodore Roosevelt/Charles W. Fairbanks	7,630,457	56.4%
Democratic	Alton B. Parker/Henry G. Davis	5,083,880	37.6%
Socialist	Eugene V. Debs/Benjamin Hanford	402,810	2.98%
Prohibition	Silas C. Swallow/George Washington Carroll	259,102	1.92%
Populist	Thomas E. Watson/Thomas Tibbles	114,070	0.84%
Socialist Labor	Charles Hunter Corregan/William Wesley Cox	33,454	0.25%

1908 United States presidential election
Party	Candidate	Votes	%
Republican	William Howard Taft/James S. Sherman	7,678,335	51.6%
Democratic	William Jennings Bryan/John W. Kern	6,408,979	43%
Socialist	Eugene V. Debs/Benjamin Hanford	420,852	2.83%
Prohibition	Eugene W. Chafin/Aaron S. Watkins	254,087	1.71%
Independence	Thomas L. Hisgen/John Temple Graves	82,574	0.55%
Populist	Thomas E. Watson/Samuel Williams	28,862	0.19%
Socialist Labor	August Gillhaus/Donald L. Munro	14,031	0.09%

1912 United States presidential election
Party	Candidate	Votes	%
Democratic	Woodrow Wilson/Thomas R. Marshall	6,296,284	41.8%
Progressive	Theodore Roosevelt/Hiram Johnson	4,122,721	27%
Republican	William Howard Taft/Nicholas Murray Butler	3,486,242	23.2%
Socialist	Eugene V. Debs/Emil Seidel	901,551	6%
Prohibition	Eugene W. Chafin/Aaron S. Watkins	208,156	1.38%
Socialist Labor	Arthur E. Reimer/August Gillhaus	29,324	0.19%

1916 United States presidential election
Party	Candidate	Votes	%
Democratic	Woodrow Wilson/Thomas R. Marshall	9,126,868	49.2%
Republican	Charles Evans Hughes/Charles W. Fairbanks	8,548,728	46.1%
Socialist	Allan L. Benson/George Ross Kirkpatrick	590,524	3.19%
Prohibition	Frank Hanly/Ira Landrith	221,302	1.19%
Progressive	None/John M. Parker	33,406	0.18%
Socialist Labor	Arthur E. Reimer/Caleb Harrison	15,295	0.08%

1920 United States presidential election
Party	Candidate	Votes	%
Republican	Warren G. Harding/Calvin Coolidge	16,114,093	60.3%
Democratic	James M. Cox/Franklin D. Roosevelt	9,139,661	34.2%
Socialist	Eugene V. Debs/Seymour Stedman	914,191	3.41%
Farmer–Labor	Parley P. Christensen/Max S. Hayes	265,395	0.99%
Prohibition	Aaron S. Watkins/D. Leigh Colvin	188,709	0.70%
American Party (Texas)	James E. Ferguson/William J. Hough	47,968	0.18%
Socialist Labor	William Wesley Cox/August Gillhaus	31,084	0.12%
Single Tax	Robert Colvin Macauley/Richard C. Barnum	5,750	0.02%

1924 United States presidential election
Party	Candidate	Votes	%
Republican	Calvin Coolidge/Charles G. Dawes	15,723,789	54%
Democratic	John W. Davis/Charles W. Bryan	8,386,242	28.8%
Progressive	Robert M. La Follette/Burton K. Wheeler	4,831,706	16.6%
Prohibition	Herman P. Faris/Marie C. Brehm	55,951	0.19%
Communist	William Z. Foster/Benjamin Gitlow	38,669	0.13%
Socialist Labor	Frank T. Johns/Verne L. Reynolds	28,633	0.10%
American	Gilbert Nations/Charles Hiram Randall	24,325	0.08%

1928 United States presidential election
Party	Candidate	Votes	%
Republican	Herbert Hoover/Charles Curtis	21,427,123	58.2%
Democratic	Al Smith/Joseph Taylor Robinson	15,015,464	40.8%
Socialist	Norman Thomas/James H. Maurer	267,478	0.73%
Communist	William Z. Foster/Benjamin Gitlow	48,551	0.13%
Socialist Labor	Verne L. Reynolds/Jeremiah D. Crowley	21,590	0.06%
Prohibition	William F. Varney/James A. Edgerton	20,095	0.05%
Farmer–Labor	Frank Webb/LeRoy R. Tillman	6,390	0.02%

1932 United States presidential election
Party	Candidate	Votes	%
Democratic	Franklin D. Roosevelt/John Nance Garner	22,821,277	57.4%
Republican	Herbert Hoover/Charles Curtis	15,761,254	39.7%
Socialist	Norman Thomas/James H. Maurer	884,885	2.23%
Communist	William Z. Foster/James W. Ford	103,307	0.26%
Prohibition	William David Upshaw/Frank S. Regan	81,905	0.21%
Liberty	William Hope Harvey/Frank Hemenway	53,425	0.13%
Socialist Labor	Verne L. Reynolds/John W. Aiken	34,038	0.09%
Farmer–Labor	Jacob S. Coxey Sr./Julius Reiter	7,431	0.02%

1936 United States presidential election
Party	Candidate	Votes	%
Democratic	Franklin D. Roosevelt/John Nance Garner	27,752,648	60.8%
Republican	Alf Landon/Frank Knox	16,681,862	36.5%
Union	William Lemke/Thomas C. O'Brien	892,378	1.95%
Socialist	Norman Thomas/George A. Nelson	187,910	0.41%
Communist	Earl Browder/James W. Ford	79,315	0.17%
Prohibition	D. Leigh Colvin/Claude A. Watson	37,646	0.08%
Socialist Labor	John W. Aiken/Emil F. Teichert	12,799	0.03%

1940 United States presidential election
Party	Candidate	Votes	%
Democratic	Franklin D. Roosevelt/Henry A. Wallace	27,313,945	54.7%
Republican	Wendell Willkie/Charles L. McNary	22,347,744	44.8%
Socialist	Norman Thomas/Maynard C. Krueger	116,599	0.23%
Prohibition	Roger Babson/Edgar Moorman	57,903	0.12%
Communist	Earl Browder/James W. Ford	48,557	0.10%
Socialist Labor	John W. Aiken/Aaron M. Orange	14,883	0.03%

1944 United States presidential election
Party	Candidate	Votes	%
Democratic	Franklin D. Roosevelt/Harry S. Truman	25,612,916	53.4%
Republican	Thomas E. Dewey/John W. Bricker	22,017,929	45.9%
Texas Regulars	None	143,238	0.30%
Socialist	Norman Thomas/Darlington Hoopes	79,017	0.16%
Prohibition	Claude A. Watson/Andrew N. Johnson	74,758	0.16%
Socialist Labor	Edward A. Teichert/Arla Arbaugh	45,188	0.09%

1948 United States presidential election
Party	Candidate	Votes	%
Democratic	Harry S. Truman/Alben W. Barkley	24,179,347	49.6%
Republican	Thomas E. Dewey/Earl Warren	21,991,292	45.1%
Dixiecrat	Strom Thurmond/Fielding L. Wright	1,175,930	2.4%
Progressive	Henry A. Wallace/Glen H. Taylor	1,157,328	2.4%
Socialist	Norman Thomas/Tucker P. Smith	139,569	0.29%
Prohibition	Claude A. Watson/Dale Learn	103,708	0.21%
Socialist Labor	Edward A. Teichert/Stephen Emery	29,244	0.06%
Socialist Workers	Farrell Dobbs/Grace Carlson	13,613	0.03%

1952 United States presidential election
Party	Candidate	Votes	%
Republican	Dwight D. Eisenhower/Richard Nixon	34,075,529	55.2%
Democratic	Adlai Stevenson II/John Sparkman	27,375,090	44.3%
Progressive	Vincent Hallinan/Charlotta Bass	140,746	0.23%
Prohibition	Stuart Hamblen/Enoch A. Holtwick	73,412	0.12%
Socialist Labor	Eric Hass/Stephen Emery	30,406	0.05%
Socialist	Darlington Hoopes/Samuel H. Friedman	20,203	0.03%
Constitution	Douglas MacArthur/Harry F. Byrd	17,205	0.03%
Socialist Workers	Farrell Dobbs/Myra Tanner Weiss	10,312	0.02%

1956 United States presidential election
Party	Candidate	Votes	%
Republican	Dwight D. Eisenhower/Richard Nixon	35,579,180	57.4%
Democratic	Adlai Stevenson II/Estes Kefauver	26,028,028	42%
Dixiecrat	T. Coleman Andrews/Thomas H. Werdel	305,274	0.5%
Independent	(Unpledged Electors)	196,318	0.32%
Socialist Labor	Eric Hass/Georgia Cozzini	44,450	0.07%
Prohibition	Enoch A. Holtwick/Edwin M. Cooper	41,937	0.07%
Socialist Workers	Farrell Dobbs/Myra Tanner Weiss	7,797	0.01%
Dixiecrat	Harry F. Byrd/William E. Jenner	2,657	<0.01%
Socialist	Darlington Hoopes/Samuel H. Friedman	2,128	<0.01%
American Third Party	Henry B. Krajewski/Anna Yezo	1,829	<0.01%
Christian Nationalist Crusade	Gerald L. K. Smith/Charles Robertson	8	<0.01%
Democratic	Walter Burgwyn Jones/Herman Talmadge	0	0%

1960 United States presidential election
Party	Candidate	Votes	%
Democratic	John F. Kennedy/Lyndon B. Johnson	34,220,984	49.7%
Republican	Richard Nixon/Henry Cabot Lodge Jr.	34,108,157	49.6%
Dixiecrat	Harry F. Byrd/Strom Thurmond	610,409	0.4%
Democratic	(unpledged electors)	286,359	0.42%
Socialist Labor	Eric Hass/Georgia Cozzini	47,522	0.07%
Prohibition	Rutherford Decker/E. Harold Munn	46,203	0.07%
Dixiecrat	Orval Faubus/John G. Crommelin	44,984	0.07%
Socialist Workers	Farrell Dobbs/Myra Tanner Weiss	40,175	0.06%
Constitution	Charles L. Sullivan/Merritt B. Curtis	18,162	0.03%
Conservative	J. Bracken Lee/Kent Courtney	8,708	0.01%

1964 United States presidential election
Party	Candidate	Votes	%
Democratic	Lyndon B. Johnson/Hubert Humphrey	43,127,041	61%
Republican	Barry Goldwater/William E. Miller	27,175,754	38.5%
Democratic	(unpledged Electors)	210,732	0.30%
Socialist Labor	Eric Hass/Henning A. Blomen	45,189	0.06%
Socialist Workers	Clifton DeBerry/Ed Shaw	32,706	0.05%
Prohibition	E. Harold Munn/Mark R. Shaw	23,267	0.03%
Dixiecrat	John Kasper/J. B. Stoner	6,953	0.01%
Constitution	Joseph B. Lightburn/Theodore Billings	5,061	0.01%

1968 United States presidential election
Party	Candidate	Votes	%
Republican	Richard Nixon/Spiro Agnew	31,783,783	43.4%
Democratic	Hubert Humphrey/Edmund Muskie	31,271,839	42.7%
American Independent	George Wallace/Curtis LeMay	9,901,118	13.5%

1972 United States presidential election
Party	Candidate	Votes	%
Republican	Richard Nixon/Spiro Agnew	47,168,710	60.7%
Democratic	George McGovern/Sargent Shriver	29,173,222	37.5%
American Independent	John G. Schmitz/Thomas J. Anderson	1,100,896	1.42%
Socialist Workers	Linda Jenness/Andrew Pulley	83,380	0.11%
People's	Benjamin Spock/Julius Hobson	78,759	0.10%
Socialist Labor	Louis Fisher/Genevieve Gunderson	53,814	0.07%
Libertarian	John Hospers/Tonie Nathan	3,674	<0.01%

1976 United States presidential election
Party	Candidate	Votes	%
Democratic	Jimmy Carter/Walter Mondale	40,831,881	50.1%
Republican	Gerald Ford/Bob Dole	39,148,634	48%
Independent	Eugene McCarthy	744,763	0.91%
Libertarian	Roger MacBride/David Bergland	172,557	0.21%
American Independent	Lester Maddox/William Dyke	170,373	0.21%
American	Thomas J. Anderson/Rufus Shackelford	158,724	0.19%
Socialist Workers	Peter Camejo/Willie Mae Reid	90,986	0.11%
Communist	Gus Hall/Jarvis Tyner	58,709	0.07%
People's	Margaret Wright/Benjamin Spock	49,016	0.06%
U.S. Labor	Lyndon LaRouche/R. Wayne Evans	40,018	0.05%
Republican	Ronald Reagan/Bob Dole	0	0%

1980 United States presidential election
Party	Candidate	Votes	%
Republican	Ronald Reagan/George H. W. Bush	43,903,230	50.7%
Democratic	Jimmy Carter/Walter Mondale	35,480,115	41%
Independent	John B. Anderson/Patrick Lucey	5,719,850	6.6%
Libertarian	Ed Clark/David Koch	921,128	1.06%
Citizens	Barry Commoner/LaDonna Harris	233,052	0.27%
Communist	Gus Hall/Angela Davis	44,933	0.05%
American Independent	John Rarick/Eileen Shearer	40,906	0.05%
Socialist Workers	Clifton DeBerry/Matilde Zimmermann	38,738	0.04%
Right to Life	Ellen McCormack/Carroll Driscoll	32,320	0.04%
Peace and Freedom	Maureen Smith/Elizabeth Cervantes Barron	18,116	0.02%

1984 United States presidential election
Party	Candidate	Votes	%
Republican	Ronald Reagan/George H. W. Bush	54,455,472	58.8%
Democratic	Walter Mondale/Geraldine Ferraro	37,577,352	40.6%
Libertarian	David Bergland/Jim Lewis	228,111	0.25%
Independent	Lyndon LaRouche/Billy Davis	78,809	0.09%
Citizens	Sonia Johnson/Richard Walton	72,161	0.08%
Populist	Bob Richards/Maureen Salaman	66,324	0.07%
New Alliance	Dennis L. Serrette/Nancy Ross	46,853	0.05%
Communist	Gus Hall/Angela Davis	36,386	0.04%
Socialist Workers	Melvin T. Mason/Matilde Zimmermann	24,699	0.03%
Workers World	Larry Holmes/Gloria La Riva	17,985	0.02%

1988 United States presidential election
Party	Candidate	Votes	%
Republican	George H. W. Bush/Dan Quayle	48,886,597	53.4%
Democratic	Michael Dukakis/Lloyd Bentsen	41,809,476	45.6%
Libertarian	Ron Paul/Andre Marrou	431,750	0.47%
New Alliance	Lenora Fulani	217,221	0.24%
Democratic	Lloyd Bentsen/Michael Dukakis	0	0%

1992 United States presidential election
Party	Candidate	Votes	%
Democratic	Bill Clinton/Al Gore	44,909,806	43%
Republican	George H. W. Bush/Dan Quayle	39,104,550	37.4%
Independent	Ross Perot/James Stockdale	19,743,821	18.9%
Libertarian	Andre Marrou/Nancy Lord	290,087	0.28%
Populist	Bo Gritz/Cyril Minett	106,152	0.10%
New Alliance	Lenora Fulani/Maria Elizabeth Muñoz	73,622	0.07%
U.S. Taxpayers'	Howard Phillips/Albion W. Knight Jr.	43,369	0.04%

1996 United States presidential election
Party	Candidate	Votes	%
Democratic	Bill Clinton/Al Gore	47,401,185	49.2%
Republican	Bob Dole/Jack Kemp	39,197,469	40.7%
Reform	Ross Perot/Pat Choate	8,085,294	8.4%
Green	Ralph Nader/Winona LaDuke	684,871	0.71%
Libertarian	Harry Browne/Jo Jorgensen	485,759	0.50%
Constitution	Howard Phillips/Herbert Titus	184,656	0.19%
Natural Law	John Hagelin/Mike Tompkins	113,667	0.12%

2000 United States presidential election
Party	Candidate	Votes	%
Republican	George W. Bush/Dick Cheney	50,456,002	47.9%
Democratic	Al Gore/Joe Lieberman	50,999,897	48.4%
Green	Ralph Nader/Winona LaDuke	2,882,955	2.74%
Reform	Pat Buchanan/Ezola Foster	448,895	0.43%
Libertarian	Harry Browne/Art Olivier	384,431	0.36%
Constitution	Howard Phillips/Curtis Frazier	98,020	0.09%
Natural Law	John Hagelin/Nat Goldhaber	83,714	0.08%

2004 United States presidential election
Party	Candidate	Votes	%
Republican	George W. Bush/Dick Cheney	62,040,610	50.7%
Democratic	John Kerry/John Edwards	59,028,444	48.3%
Democratic	John Edwards/John Edwards	5	<0.01%
Independent	Ralph Nader/Peter Camejo	465,650	0.38%
Libertarian	Michael Badnarik/Richard Campagna	397,265	0.32%
Constitution	Michael Peroutka/Chuck Baldwin	143,630	0.12%
Green	David Cobb/Pat LaMarche	119,859	0.10%
Peace and Freedom	Leonard Peltier/Janice Jordan	27,607	0.02%
Socialist	Walt Brown/Mary Alice Herbert	10,837	0.01%
Socialist Workers	Róger Calero/Arrin Hawkins	3,689	0.01%
Christian Freedom Party	Thomas Harens/Jennifer A. Ryan	2,387	0.002%

2008 United States presidential election
Party	Candidate	Votes	%
Democratic	Barack Obama/Joe Biden	69,498,516	52.9%
Republican	John McCain/Sarah Palin	59,948,323	45.7%
Independent	Ralph Nader/Matt Gonzalez	739,034	0.56%
Libertarian	Bob Barr/Wayne Allyn Root	523,715	0.40%
Constitution	Chuck Baldwin/Darrell Castle	199,750	0.15%
Green	Cynthia McKinney/Rosa Clemente	161,797	0.12%
American Independent	Alan Keyes/Wiley Drake	47,746	0.04%

2012 United States presidential election
Party	Candidate	Votes	%
Democratic	Barack Obama/Joe Biden	65,915,795	51.1%
Republican	Mitt Romney/Paul Ryan	60,933,504	47.2%
Libertarian	Gary Johnson/Jim Gray	1,275,971	0.99%
Green	Jill Stein/Cheri Honkala	469,627	0.36%
Constitution	Virgil Goode/James N. Clymer	122,389	0.11%
Peace and Freedom	Roseanne Barr/Cindy Sheehan	67,326	0.05%
Justice	Rocky Anderson/Luis J. Rodriguez	43,018	0.03%
American Independent	Tom Hoefling/J.D. Ellis	40,628	0.03%

2016 United States presidential election
Party	Candidate	Votes	%
Republican	Donald Trump/Mike Pence	62,984,828	46.09%
Democratic	Hillary Clinton/Tim Kaine	65,844,610	48.18%
Libertarian	Gary Johnson/William Weld	4,489,341	3.28%
Green	Jill Stein/Ajamu Baraka	1,457,218	1.07%
Independent	Evan McMullin/Mindy Finn	731,991	0.54%
Constitution	Darrell Castle/Scott Bradley	203,090	0.15%
Socialism and Liberation	Gloria La Riva/Eugene Puryear	74,401	0.05%

2020 United States presidential election
Party	Candidate	Votes	%
Democratic	Joe Biden/Kamala Harris	81,283,501	51.31%
Republican	Donald Trump/Mike Pence	74,223,975	46.85%
Libertarian	Jo Jorgensen/Spike Cohen	1,865,535	1.18%
Green	Howie Hawkins/Angela Walker	407,068	0.26%

2024 United States presidential election
Party	Candidate	Votes	%
Republican	Donald Trump/JD Vance	77,302,169	49.74%
Democratic	Kamala Harris/Tim Walz	75,015,834	48.27%
Green	Jill Stein/Butch Ware	861,141	0.55%
Independent	Robert F. Kennedy Jr./Nicole Shanahan	756,377	0.49%
Libertarian	Chase Oliver/Mike ter Maat	650,142	0.42%

== Voter turnout ==
Voter turnout in the 2004 and 2008 elections showed a noticeable increase over the turnout in 1996 and 2000. Prior to 2004, voter turnout in presidential elections had been decreasing while voter registration, measured in terms of voting age population (VAP) by the U.S. census, had been increasing. The VAP figure, however, includes persons ineligible to vote – mainly noncitizens and ineligible felons – and excludes overseas eligible voters. Opinion is mixed on whether this decline was due to voter apathy or an increase in ineligible voters on the rolls. The difference between these two measures is illustrated by analysis of turnout in the 2004 and 2008 elections. Voter turnout from the 2004 and 2008 election was "not statistically different", based on the voting age population used by a November 2008 U.S. census survey of 50,000 households. If expressed in terms of vote-eligible population (VEP), the 2008 national turnout rate was 61.7% from 131.3 million ballots cast for president, an increase of over 1.6 percentage points from the 60.1% turnout rate of 2004 and the highest since 1968.

== Financial disclosures ==
Prior to 1967, many presidential candidates disclosed assets, stock holdings, and other information which might affect the public trust. In that year, Republican candidate George W. Romney went a step further and released his tax returns for the previous twelve years. Since then, many presidential candidates – including all major-party nominees from 1980 to 2012 – have released some of their returns, although few of the major party nominees have equaled or exceeded George Romney's twelve. The Tax History Project – a project directed by Joseph J. Thorndike and established by the nonprofit Tax Analysts group – has compiled the publicly released tax returns of presidents and presidential candidates (including primary candidates).

In 2016, Republican presidential nominee Donald Trump broke with tradition, becoming the only major-party candidate since Gerald Ford in 1976 to not make any of his full tax returns public. Trump said that his refusal to do so was because he was under audit by the IRS. However, no law or precedent prevents a person from releasing their tax returns while under audit. President Richard M. Nixon released his tax returns while they were under audit.

== Presidential coattails ==
Presidential elections are held on the same date as those for all the seats in the House of Representatives, the full terms for 33 or 34 of the 100 seats in the Senate, the governorships of several states, and many state and local elections. Presidential candidates tend to bring out supporters who then vote for their party's candidates for those other offices. These other candidates are said to ride on the presidential candidates' coattails. Voter turnout is also generally higher during presidential election years than either midterm election years or off-year election years.

Since the end of World War II, there have been a total of five American presidential elections that had significant coattail effects: Harry Truman in 1948, Dwight Eisenhower in 1952, Lyndon Johnson in 1964, Ronald Reagan in 1980, and Barack Obama in 2008. However, Truman's victory in 1948 and Eisenhower's victory in 1952 remain the last two elections in which the same party both won the White House and elected enough members of the House take control of it from its opponents. The last American presidential election in which the same party both won the White House and elected enough members of the Senate to take control of it from its opponents was Barack Obama's win in 2008.

Year	Elected president	President's party	Net gain/loss of president's party (Note: Party shading shows which party controls chamber after that election.)	
Year	Elected president	President's party	House seats	Senate seats
1948	Harry S. Truman	Democratic	+75: (188 ► 263)	+9: (45 ► 54)
1952	Dwight D. Eisenhower	Republican	+22: (199 ► 221)	+2: (47 ► 49)
1956	Dwight D. Eisenhower	Republican	-2: (203 ► 201)	0: (47 ► 47)
1960	John F. Kennedy	Democratic	-21: (283 ► 262)	-1: (65 ► 64)
1964	Lyndon B. Johnson	Democratic	+37: (258 ► 295)	+2: (66 ► 68)
1968	Richard Nixon	Republican	+5: (187 ► 192)	+5: (37 ► 42)
1972	Richard Nixon	Republican	+12: (180 ► 192)	-2: (44 ► 42)
1976	Jimmy Carter	Democratic	+1: (291 ► 292)	0: (61 ► 61)
1980	Ronald Reagan	Republican	+34: (158 ► 192)	+12: (41 ► 53)
1984	Ronald Reagan	Republican	+16: (166 ► 182)	-2: (55 ► 53)
1988	George H. W. Bush	Republican	-2: (177 ► 175)	-1: (46 ► 45)
1992	Bill Clinton	Democratic	-9: (267 ► 258)	0: (57 ► 57)
1996	Bill Clinton	Democratic	+2: (204 ► 206)	-2: (47 ► 45)
2000	George W. Bush	Republican	-2: (223 ► 221)	-4: (54 ► 50)
2004	George W. Bush	Republican	+3: (229 ► 232)	+4: (51 ► 55)
2008	Barack Obama	Democratic	+21: (236 ► 257)	+8: (51 ► 59)
2012	Barack Obama	Democratic	+8: (193 ► 201)	+2: (53 ► 55)
2016	Donald Trump	Republican	-6: (247 ► 241)	-2: (54 ► 52)
2020	Joe Biden	Democratic	-13: (235 ► 222)	+3: (47 ► 50)
2024	Donald Trump	Republican	-2: (222 ► 220)	+4: (49 ► 53)

== Comparison with other U.S. general elections ==
Basic rotation of U.S. general elections (fixed terms only^{[1]})
Year	2026	2027	2028	2029	2030
Type	Midterm	Off-year	Presidential	Off-year	Midterm
President	No		Yes	No	
Senate	Class II (33 seats)	No	Class III (34 seats)	No	Class I (33 seats)
House	All 435 seats^{[2]}	No	All 435 seats^{[3]}	No	All 435 seats^{[2]}
Gubernatorial	36 states, DC, & 3 territories^{[4]} AL, AK, AZ, AR, CA, CO, CT, FL, GA, HI, ID, IL, IA, KS, ME, MD, MA, MI, MN, NE, NV, NH, NM, NY, OH, OK, OR, PA, RI, SC, SD, TN, TX, VT, WI, WY, DC (Mayor), GU, MP, VI	3 states KY, LA, MS	11 states, 2 territories DE, IN, MO, MT, NH, NC, ND, UT, VT, WA, WV, AS, PR	2 states NJ, VA	36 states, DC, & 3 territories^{[4]} AL, AK, AZ, AR, CA, CO, CT, FL, GA, HI, ID, IL, IA, KS, ME, MD, MA, MI, MN, NE, NV, NH, NM, NY, OH, OK, OR, PA, RI, SC, SD, TN, TX, VT, WI, WY, DC (Mayor), GU, MP, VI
Lieutenant gubernatorial^{[5]}	10 states^{[6]} AL, AR, CA, GA, ID, NV, OK, RI, TX, VT	2 states LA, MS	5 states, 1 territory DE, MO, NC, VT, WA, AS	1 state VA	10 states^{[6]} AL, AR, CA, GA, ID, NV, OK, RI, TX, VT
Secretary of state	25 states AL, AZ, AR, CA, CO, CT, GA, ID, IL, IN, IA, KS, MA, MI, MN, NE, NV, NM, ND, OH, RI, SC, VT, WI, WY	3 states KY, LA, MS	7 states MO, MT, NC, OR, VT, WA, WV	None	25 states AL, AZ, AR, CA, CO, CT, GA, ID, IL, IN, IA, KS, MA, MI, MN, NE, NV, NM, ND, OH, RI, SC, VT, WI, WY
Attorney general	30 states, DC, & 2 territories AL, AZ, AR, CA, CO, CT, DE, FL, GA, ID, IL, IA, KS, MD, MA, MI, MN, NE, NV, NM, NY, ND, OH, OK, RI, SC, SD, TX, VT, WI, DC, GU, MP	3 states KY, LA, MS	10 states IN, MO, MT, NC, OR, PA, UT, VT, WA, WV	1 state VA	30 states, DC, & 2 territories AL, AZ, AR, CA, CO, CT, DE, FL, GA, ID, IL, IA, KS, MD, MA, MI, MN, NE, NV, NM, NY, ND, OH, OK, RI, SC, SD, TX, VT, WI, WY, DC, GU, MP
State treasurer^{[7]}	23 states AL, AZ, AR, CA, CO, CT, FL (CFO), ID, IL, IN, IA, KS, MA, NE, NV, NM, OH, OK, RI, SC, VT, WI, WY	3 states KY, LA, MS	9 states MO, NC, ND, OR, PA, UT, VT, WA, WV	None	23 states AL, AZ, AR, CA, CO, CT, FL (CFO), ID, IL, IN, IA, KS, MA, NE, NV, NM, OH, OK, RI, SC, VT, WI, WY
State comptroller/controller	8 states CA, CT, IL, MD, NV, NY, SC, TX	None	None	None	8 states CA, CT, IL, MD, NV, NY, SC, TX
State auditor	15 states AL, AR, DE, IN, IA, MA, MN, MO, NE, NM, OH, OK, SD, VT, WY	2 states KY, MS	9 states MT, NC, ND, PA, UT, VT, WA, WV, GU	None	15 states AL, AR, DE, IN, IA, MA, MN, MO, NE, NM, OH, OK, SD, VT, WY
Superintendent of public instruction	7 states AZ, CA, GA, ID, OK, SC, WY	None	4 states MT, NC, ND, WA	1 state WI	7 states AZ, CA, GA, ID, OK, SC, WY
Agriculture commissioner	6 states AL, FL, GA, IA, ND, SC, TX	3 states KY, LA, MS	2 states NC, WV	None	6 states AL, FL, GA, IA, ND, SC, TX
Insurance commissioner	5 states CA, DE, GA, KS, OK	2 states LA, MS	3 states NC, ND, WA	None	5 states CA, DE, GA, KS, OK
Other commissioners & elected officials	9 states AZ (Mine Inspector), AR (Land), GA (Labor), NM (Land), ND (Tax), OK (Labor), OR (Labor), SD (Land), TX (Land)	None	1 state NC (Labor)	None	9 states AZ (Mine Inspector), AR (Land), GA (Labor), NM (Land), ND (Tax), OK (Labor), OR (Labor), SD (Land), TX (Land)
State legislatures^{[8]}	46 states, DC, & 4 territories AK, AL, AZ, AR, CA, CO, CT, DE, FL, GA, HI, ID, IL, IN, IA, KS, KY, ME, MA, MD, MI, MN, MO, NE, NV, NH, NM, NY, NC, ND, OH, OK, OR, PA, RI, SC, SD, TN, TX, UT, VT, WA, WV, WI, WY, DC, AS, GU, MP, VI	4 states LA, MS, NJ, VA	44 states, DC, & 5 territories AK, AZ, AR, CA, CO, CT, DE, FL, GA, HI, ID, IL, IN, IA, KS, KY, ME, MA, MI, MN, MO, NE, NV, NH, NM, NY, NC, ND, OH, OK, OR, PA, RI, SC, SD, TN, TX, UT, VT, WA, WV, WI, WY, DC, AS, GU, MP, PR, VI	2 states VA. NJ	46 states, DC, & 4 territories AK, AL, AZ, AR, CA, CO, CT, DE, FL, GA, HI, ID, IL, IN, IA, KS, KY, ME, MA, MD, MI, MN, MO, NE, NV, NH, NM, NY, NC, ND, OH, OK, OR, PA, RI, SC, SD, TN, TX, UT, VT, WA, WV, WI, WY, DC, AS, GU, MP, VI
State boards of education^{[9]}	8 states, DC, & 3 territories AL, CO, KS, MI, NE, OH, TX, UT, DC, GU, MP, VI	None	8 states, DC, & 3 territories AL, CO, KS, MI, NE, OH, TX, UT, DC, GU, MP, VI	None	8 states, DC, & 3 territories AL, CO, KS, MI, NE, OH, TX, UT, DC, GU, MP, VI
Other state, local, and tribal offices	Varies				

^{1} This table does not include special elections, which may be held to fill political offices that have become vacant between the regularly scheduled elections.
^{2} As well as all six non-voting delegates of the U.S. House.
^{3} As well as five non-voting delegates of the U.S. House. The resident commissioner of Puerto Rico instead serves a four-year term that coincides with the presidential term.
^{4} The governors of New Hampshire and Vermont are each elected to two-year terms. The other 48 state governors and all five territorial governors serve four-year terms.
^{5} In 26 states and 3 territories the lieutenant governor is elected on the same ticket as the governor: AK, CO, CT, FL, HI, IL, IN, IA, KS, KY, MD, MA, MI, MN, MT, NE, NJ, NM, NY, ND, OH, PA, SC, SD, UT, WI, GU, MP, VI.
^{6} Like the governor, Vermont's other officials are each elected to two-year terms. All other state officers for all other states listed serve four-year terms.
^{7} In some states, the comptroller or controller has the duties equivalent to a treasurer. There are some states with both positions, so both have been included separately.
^{8} This list does not differentiate chambers of each legislature. Forty-nine state legislatures are bicameral; Nebraska is unicameral. Additionally, Washington, DC, Guam, and the US Virgin Islands are unicameral; the other territories are bicameral. All legislatures have varying terms for their members. Many have two-year terms for the lower house and four-year terms for the upper house. Some have all two-year terms and some all four-year terms. Arkansas has a combination of both two- and four-year terms in the same chamber.
^{9} Most states not listed here have a board appointed by the governor and legislature. All boards listed here have members that serve four-year staggered terms, except Colorado, which has six-year terms, and Guam, which has two-year terms. Most are elected statewide, some are elected from districts. Louisiana, Ohio, Guam, and the Northern Mariana Islands have additional members who are appointed.

== See also ==
- Outline of American politics § Elections
- American election campaigns in the 19th century
- List of United States presidential campaign slogans

=== Lists ===
- List of presidents of the United States
- List of United States presidential candidates
- List of United States presidential election results by state
- List of United States presidential elections by Electoral College margin
- List of United States presidential elections by popular vote margin

=== Party systems ===
- First Party System, Federalists vs Democratic-Republicans, 1790s–1820s
- Second Party System, Whigs vs Democrats, 1830s–1850s
- Third Party System, Republicans vs Democrats, 1850s–1890s, Civil War, Reconstruction, Gilded Age
- Fourth Party System, Republicans vs Democrats, 1890s–1930s; "Progressive Era"
- Fifth Party System, Republicans vs Democrats, 1930s–1980s
- Sixth Party System, Republicans vs Democrats, 1980s–present

=== Comparing elected candidate to popular vote or margins ===
- List of United States presidential candidates by number of votes received
- List of United States presidential elections by popular vote margin
- List of United States presidential elections by Electoral College margin
- United States presidential elections in which the winner lost the popular vote

=== Statistical forecasts ===
- Decision Desk HQ
- Electoral-vote.com
- FiveThirtyEight
- PollyVote
