= John Thorndike =

John Thorndike may refer to:

- John Thorndike (settler), one of the first founders of the Massachusetts Bay Colony
- John Thorndike (writer), American writer
