= John Thorndike (writer) =

American writer (born 1942)

John Thorndike (born November 6, 1942, in New York City) is an American writer.

== Biography ==
Thorndike lives in Athens, Ohio. He grew up in Westport, Connecticut, graduated from Deerfield Academy in 1960, and from Harvard in 1964, took an MA in English from Columbia in 1966, and spent two years in El Salvador in the Peace Corps. After seven years in Latin America, he returned to the U.S., settled in Ohio and farmed for ten years.

His first book was the novel Anna Delaney’s Child, about a woman whose nine-year-old son dies in a car crash.

His second novel was The Potato Baron, about the owner of a large potato farm in northern Maine who must choose between his wife—who wants to live somewhere other than Aroostook County—and the life he loves on his ancestral land.

Thorndike's third book was a memoir, Another Way Home, about raising his son after his wife became schizophrenic.

His next book, The Last of His Mind: A Year in The Shadow of Alzheimer’s, was published by Swallow Press, a division of Ohio University Press, in October 2009. It is a memoir of the year he spent looking after his father, Joseph J. Thorndike—the managing editor of Life from 1946 to 1949 and a founder of American Heritage and Horizon magazines—as he lost his memory, language, self-awareness, and ultimately his life.

His fifth book, A Hundred Fires in Cuba, was published in 2018 by Beck & Branch. Kirkus gave it a starred review. It's a historical novel that opens in 1959 in Havana, where a young American photographer must choose between her stable Cuban husband and her first love, Camilo Cienfuegos, the father of her child and now a hero of the Cuban Revolution.

== Bibliography ==
- Anna Delaney’s Child - Hardcover: 273 pages, Macmillan (1986), ISBN 0-02-618390-0. Paperback: 273 pages; Plume (1987), ISBN 0-452-25998-3
- The Potato Baron - Hardcover: 284 pages, Villard (1989), ISBN 0-394-57712-4
- Another Way Home: A Single Father’s Story - Hardcover: 245 pages, Crown (1996), ISBN 0-517-70542-7; Paperback: 245 pages, Penguin (1997), ISBN 0-14-026570-8
- The Last of His Mind - 243 pages, Swallow Press (2009), ISBN 978-0-8040-1122-8. Paperback: 243 pages, Swallow Press (2011), ISBN 978-0-8040-1136-5
