= Joseph J. Thorndike =

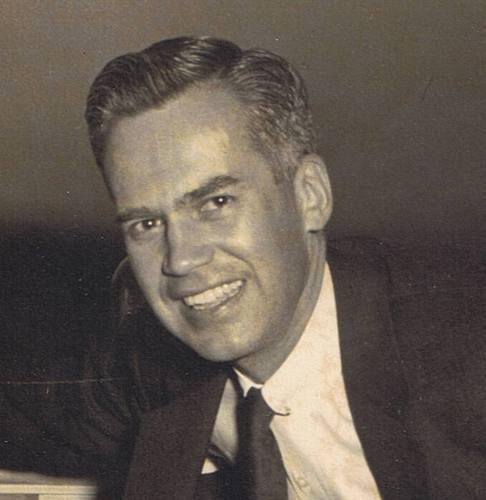
Joseph J. Thorndike

Joseph Jacobs Thorndike (July 29, 1913 – November 22, 2005) was an American editor and writer. He was Managing Editor of Life for three years in the late 1940s, and a co-founder of American Heritage and Horizon magazines.

== Biography ==
Thorndike was born and raised in Peabody, Massachusetts, a small town north of Boston. His father was a stockbroker, his mother a teacher. Thorndike was a straight A student at Peabody High, valedictorian of his class, and a writer for two school magazines.

At Harvard ('34) he majored in economics, but spent much of his time at The Harvard Crimson, rising to Managing Editor his junior year, and to president his senior year.

In June 1934, he started work at Time magazine, writing people, miscellany and education articles. He was asked by Henry Luce to join a group planning a new picture magazine, and when Life debuted in 1936, Thorndike, though only 23, was an associate editor of the magazine.. His immediate boss at Life was John Shaw Billings, the first Managing Editor. Billings kept a diary in which, according to Loudon Wainwright's book The Great American Magazine: An Inside History of Life, he called Thorndike "a mulish young Yankee," and "a stubborn little New England cuss". Wainwright himself called Thorndike "a handsome, bright, reserved, efficient fellow...ambitious, proud, marked from the start for bigger things."

In 1946, as Life's circulation topped five million, Thorndike became the magazine's third Managing Editor, a position he held for three years. Toward the end of his stay, disagreements grew between him and Luce. Life, in late 1948, had published a "Life Goes To A Party" story about an uninhibited dance party in Hawaii, including photos of scantily-dressed partygoers. Luce's reaction was to subject the Managing Editor to more supervision, which Thorndike resisted. The dispute came to a head in August, 1949, after Luce circulated a memoir proposing an "Editor-in-Chief's Committee" that would decide on all future articles for the magazine. Thorndike read it, packed his briefcase and resigned.

In 1950, Thorndike and another refugee from Life, Oliver Jensen, formed a small publishing company, Picture Press. They put out a book of cowboy photos by Life photographer Leonard McCombe, and a lavish picture book for Ford Motor Company, Ford at Fifty. James Parton, whom Thorndike had known at the Crimson, joined them in 1952 to create Thorndike Jensen & Parton, and in 1954 they took over a small history publication named American Heritage. They enlarged it, turned it into a hardcover, profusely illustrated bimonthly with no advertisements, and hired popular American Civil War historian Bruce Catton as editor and writer.

Circulation at American Heritage rose to over 300,000. David McCullough, author of the bestsellers Truman and John Adams, and writer and editor for the magazine, later said that it was "the best place I ever worked as an employee... They were receptive to new ideas, with very high editorial standards, high accuracy, and quality writing... You felt like you were cast in a hit show with great people."

A second magazine, Horizon, followed in 1958, and over the next three decades the company published dozens of illustrated books on history, art and architecture. Thorndike wrote two of them: The Magnificent Builders And Their Dream Houses (1978), and The Very Rich: A History of Wealth (1985).

American Heritage sold to McGraw-Hill in 1970, to private investor Samuel Pryor Reed of New York City in 1976, to Forbes in 1986, and to an independent publisher, Edwin S. Grosvenor, in 2007.

In his early seventies, Thorndike served for two years as head of The American Heritage Dictionary Usage Panel, a group of writers and scholars who are polled on acceptable English usage.

In 1993 Thorndike published his last book, The Coast: A Journey Down the Atlantic Shore, which Kirkus Reviews described as "an effective combination of eyeball observation, rich history, and sad acknowledgment of how poorly we have used still another national resource."

Thorndike was married twice: to Virginia Lemont in 1940, with whom he had two sons, John and Alan, and to Margery Darrell in 1964, with whom he had a son, Joe. For twenty-eight years until she died in 2004, Thorndike had a close relationship with his "great and good friend" Jane Allport.

Thorndike died in 2005 of complications from Alzheimer's and congestive heart failure. He is buried in the Island Pond Cemetery in Harwich, Massachusetts.

== Books ==
- The Magnificent Builders and Their Dream Houses - Hardcover: 352 pages, American Heritage Publishing Co. (1978), ISBN 978-0-8281-3064-6
- The Very Rich: A History of Wealth - Hardcover: 344 pages, American Heritage Publishing Co. (1985), ISBN 978-0-517-36234-1.
- The Coast: A Journey Down the Atlantic Shore - Hardcover: 227 pages, St. Martin's Press (1993), ISBN 0-312-08700-4
