= Thorndike =

Thorndike or Thorndyke may refer to:

== People ==
- Andrew Thorndike (1909–1979), a German film director
- Ashley Horace Thorndike (1871–1933), an American educator
- Augustus Thorndike (1896–1986), an American physician
- Edward Thorndike (1874–1949), a behavioral psychologist
- Elizabeth Thorndike (1632–1672), the second wife of John Proctor, daughter of John Thorndike
- Frances Cope (1902–1982), née Elizabeth Frances Thorndike, an American mathematician, daughter of Edward Thorndike
- Guillermo Thorndike (1940–2009), a Peruvian journalist and writer
- Helen Louise Thorndyke, pseudonym for the multiple authors of the Honey Bunch book series
- Herbert Thorndike (1598–1672), an English academic and clergyman
- Israel Thorndike (1755–1832), an American sailor, merchant, and politician
- John Thorndike (settler) (1611/12–1668), one of the founders of the Massachusetts Bay Colony, brother of Herbert Thorndike
- John Lowell Thorndike (1926–2020), an American purveyor of music and non-profit organizations, president of the Harvard Club of Boston
- John Thorndike, (b. 1942), an American writer
- Joseph J. Thorndike (1913–2005), an American editor and writer
- Lynn Thorndike (1882–1965), an American historian, brother of Ashley Horace Thorndike
- Robert L. Thorndike (1910–1990), an American psychologist, son of Edward Thorndike
- Robert M. Thorndike (born 1943), an American psychologist, son of Robert L. Thorndike
- Russell Thorndike (1885–1972), a British actor and novelist, brother of Sybil Thorndike
- Sybil Thorndike (1882–1976), a British actress
- W. L. Thorndyke, perpetrator of the Maggie Murphy hoax

== Fictional characters ==
- Dr. Thorndyke, a fictional detective in novels by R. Austin Freeman
- Chris Thorndyke, a human boy in the Sonic X anime television series
- Key Thorndyke, fictional newspaper magnate in the 1948 film State of the Union (film)
- Peter Thorndyke, villain in the 1968 film The Love Bug
- Dr. Richard Thorndyke, main character in the 1977 film High Anxiety

== Places ==
- Thorndike, Maine, a town in the United States
- Thorndike, Massachusetts, community in the city of Palmer

== Other ==
- Kennedy–Thorndike experiment
- Thorndyke (TV series), a 1964 BBC television series
