= John Thorndike (settler) =

John Thorndike (February 23, 1611 or 1612 – interred 1668) was one of the first founders of the Massachusetts Bay Colony. Other sources show his birth date as born February 1610/11.

== Biography ==
Coat of Arms of John Thorndike

Thorndike was a farmer and cowherd from Great Carlton, Lincolnshire, England. He and his wife Elizabeth Stratton may have been among the emigrants who sailed to America on the Arbella in 1630. Other sources indicate that John Thorndike emigrated to America in 1632 and that Elizabeth Stratton emigrated to America in 1635 along with her mother and brother. The Thorndikes settled in the area around Ipswich as one of the first thirteen settlers. They were the parents of seven children, one son, Captain Paul Thorndike, and several daughters including Elizabeth Thorndike, who later became the second wife of John Proctor who was executed as a witch during the Salem Witch Trials.

John Thorndike was buried on November 3, 1668, in the East Cloister of Westminster Abbey, alongside his brother Herbert Thorndike, the Canon of Westminster Abbey. Herbert Thorndike wrote the Syriac Chapter to Walton's Polyglot and was a Fellow of Hebrew at Cambridge University.

John and Elizabeth Thorndike have many descendants, most of which are in the United States but there are branches of the family tree in Canada, Germany and Argentina. Among their descendants include Robert Thorndike, the founder of Rockport, Maine, Ashley Horace Thorndike, Augustus Thorndike, Edward Thorndike, Israel Thorndike, Lynn Thorndike, Robert L. Thorndike, Robert M. Thorndike, Stephen Thorndike, Joseph J. Thorndike, John Thorndike, William Endicott, George Thorndike Angell, C. Allen Thorndike Rice, Guillermo Thorndike, Felipe Thorndike, Abiel Abbot Low, Seth Low, Micaela Cousiño y Quiñones de León, and John Kerry.
