= Karl Holzinger =

American educational psychologist

- Born: Karl John Holzinger; August 9, 1892; Washington, D.C.
- Died: January 15, 1954 (aged 61); Chicago, Illinois
- Education: University of Minnesota; University of Chicago; University College London
- Known for: Factor analysis
- Scientific career
- Fields: Educational psychology Psychometrics
- Institutions: University of Chicago
- Thesis: The indexing of a mental characteristic (1922)

Karl John Holzinger (August 9, 1892 – January 15, 1954) was an American educational psychologist known for his work in psychometrics.

== Education ==
Holzinger received his A.B. and A.M. degrees from the University of Minnesota in 1915 and 1917, respectively. He then attended the University of Chicago, from which he received his Ph.D. in 1922. He subsequently studied at University College London with both Karl Pearson and Charles Spearman. Holzinger became interested in intelligence testing through his work with Spearman.

== Academic career ==
Holzinger spent almost his entire academic career at the University of Chicago, teaching in the Department of Education there for thirty-two years. He was elected vice president of the American Statistical Association in 1933 and president of the Psychometric Society in 1940. From 1949 until his death, he was co-editor-in-chief of the Journal of Educational Psychology.

== Research ==
Holzinger is known for his research on the use of factor analysis to study human intelligence. He developed the theory that human intelligence consists of three types of abilities, or factors. This theory has since become the basis of many contemporary hierarchical theories of intelligence. He conducted much of his research as a member of the Unitary Traits Committee, which he and Edward Thorndike had established in 1931. He also collaborated with Horatio Newman and Frank N. Freeman on an early, large-scale twin study that began in 1927. According to M. Susan Lindee, this study "...was extraordinary in its depth and complexity".
