= Claude Clegg =

American historian

Claude Clegg (full name: Claude Andrew Clegg III) is a historian who specializes in the history of the African diaspora in the Americas. He is currently the Lyle V. Jones Distinguished Professor at the University of North Carolina at Chapel Hill, with a joint appointment in African, African American, and Diaspora Studies.

== Education ==
Clegg holds a BA from the University of North Carolina at Chapel Hill and a PhD from the University of Michigan.

== Works ==
Clegg has written several books, including The Black President: Hope and Fury in the Age of Obama, An Original Man: The Life and Times of Elijah Muhammad, Troubled Ground: A Tale of Murder, Lynching, and Reckoning in the New South, and The Price of Liberty: African Americans and the Making of Liberia.

== Selected bibliography ==
- The Black President: Hope and Fury in the Age of Obama, Baltimore: Johns Hopkins University Press, 2021, ISBN 978-1-4214-4188-7
- An Original Man: The Life and Times of Elijah Muhammad, New York: St. Martin’s Press, 1997. Reprinted by the University of North Carolina Press, 2014, ISBN 978-1-4696-1805-0.
- The Price of Liberty: African Americans and the Making of Liberia, Chapel Hill: University of North Carolina Press, 2004, ISBN 978-0-8078-5516-4.
- Troubled Ground: A Tale of Murder, Lynching, and Reckoning in the New South, Urbana and Chicago: University of Illinois Press, 2010, ISBN 978-0-252-07782-1.

== Sources ==
- Faculty bio page, University of North Carolina at Chapel Hill
