= Psychometric Society =

International nonprofit organization

The Psychometric Society is an international nonprofit professional organization founded on September 4, 1935, devoted to the advancement of quantitative measurement practices in psychology, education, and the social sciences. The society publishes a scientific journal called Psychometrika, concentrating on the area of statistics. The society also conducts an annual scientific meeting.

== Presidents ==
This is a list of past presidents of the Psychometric Society.

- Louis Leon Thurstone
- Edward Thorndike
- J.P. Guilford
- Truman L. Kelley
- Karl J. Holzinger
- Jack W. Dunlap
- Paul Horst
- Henry E. Garrett
- Harold Gulliksen
- Edward E. Cureton
- Harold A. Edgerton
- Irving Lorge
- Phillip Justin Rulon
- Dorothy Adkins
- Quinn McNemar
- John C. Flanagan
- Robert L. Thorndike 1952-53
- Lyle V. Jones 1962-63
- Louis Guttman
- Joseph Kruskal
- Quinn McNemar
- Ben J. Winer
- Shizuhiko Nishisato
- Fumiko Samejima
- Frederick Mosteller
- Jacqueline Meulman
- David Thissen
- Sophia Rabe-Hesketh
- Alberto Maydeu-Olivares
- Ulf Böckenholt
- Bengt O. Muthén
- Peter M. Bentler
- Karl G. Jöreskog
- R. Duncan Luce
- Joseph Kruskal
- Robert L. Thorndike
