= Cognitive Abilities Test =

American student assessment test

Cognitive Abilities Test is either of two different educational assessment tests.

== CogAT ==
The Cognitive Abilities Test (CogAT) is a group-administered K–12 assessment published by Riverside Insights and intended to estimate students' learned reasoning and problem solving abilities through a battery of verbal, quantitative, and nonverbal test items. The test purports to assess students' acquired reasoning abilities while also predicting achievement scores when administered with the co-normed Iowa Tests. The test was originally published in 1954 as the Lorge-Thorndike Intelligence Test, after the psychologists who authored the first version of it, Irving Lorge and Robert L. Thorndike. The CogAT is one of several tests used in the United States to help teachers or other school staff make student placement decisions for gifted education programs, and is accepted for admission to Intertel, a high IQ society for those who score at or above the 99th percentile on a test of intelligence.

Forms 7 and 8 provide comparable scores and may be administered separately or together. Form 7 of the CogAT was designed to be appropriate for non-native English speakers.

=== Subtests ===
Each level of the CogAT includes test batteries with verbal, quantitative, or nonverbal items. Scores are reported separately for each category, and the three batteries may be administered separately.

== CAT4 ==
The Cognitive Abilities Test Fourth Edition (CAT4) is a set of cognitive tests used by many schools in the UK, Ireland, and internationally. The tests were created by GL Education to assess cognitive abilities and predict the future performance of a student. It consists of eight subtests: figure classification; figure matrices; verbal classification; verbal analogies; number analogies; number series; figure analysis; figure recognition.

These tests are used to evaluate different foundational cognitive abilities of a student:

- non-verbal,
- verbal,
- quantitative
- spatial abilities.

The CAT4 tests are levelled by age / year group and are also used by many schools as part of their admissions process. There is some overlap between CAT4 levels to allow for the same cohort sitting the same test. The tests were primarily created to predict future attainment and are based on a significant sample of students in the UK who were tested at multiple stages during the childhood. Their results were then cross-referenced with their achievements to determine the previous score that predicted future attainment. The impact of the school and home environment is significant of course on learning but an innate ability to learn new skills and problem solve is something which selective schools find much easier.

== See also ==
- Educational psychology
- School psychology
- Intelligence quotient (IQ)
