= Horatio Newman =

American geneticist

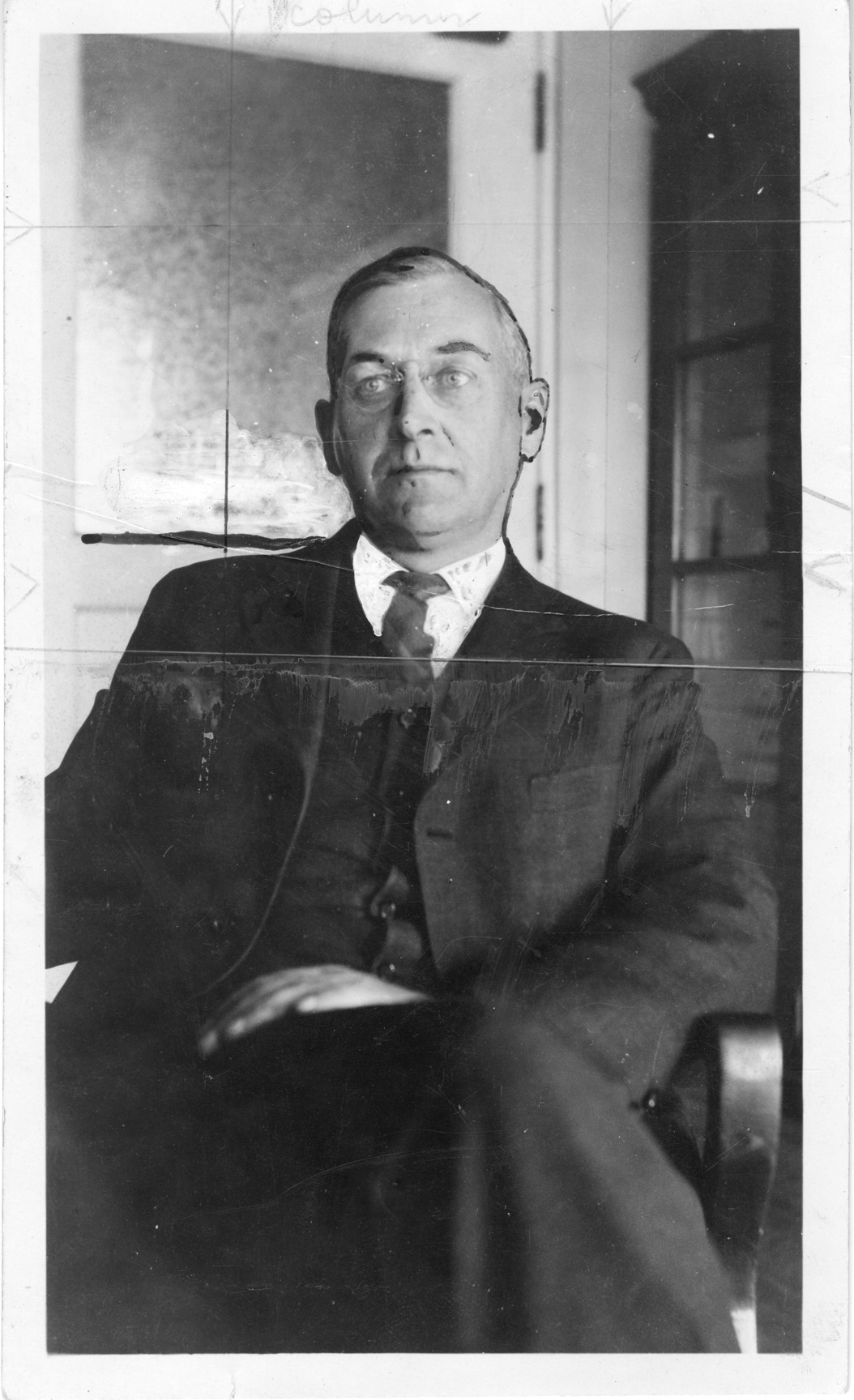
- Born: Horatio Hackett Newman; March 19, 1875; Near Seale, Alabama
- Died: August 29, 1957 (aged 82); Clearwater, Florida
- Education: Toronto Baptist College; University of Chicago
- Known for: Human genetics Twin studies
- Spouses: Isobel Currie Marshall (m. 1907–1954) Marie E. Heald (m. 1954–1957)
- Scientific career
- Fields: Genetics; Zoology
- Institutions: University of Michigan; University of Texas; University of Chicago
- Thesis: The Morphogeny of the Chelonian Carapace (1905)

Horatio Hackett Newman (March 19, 1875 – August 29, 1957) was an American zoologist and geneticist who taught at the University of Chicago. Along with Frank Rattray Lillie and Charles M. Child, he is credited with building the University of Chicago's zoology department into one of the best respected departments of its kind. Newman is also recognized for his research on multiple births in humans and other animal species. This included research conducted on human twins with Karl Holzinger and Frank N. Freeman, which led to the publication of their 1937 book Twins. It also led to his book Multiple Human Births, which was published in 1940. That year, Time reported, "In the U.S. there are at least 2,000,000 people who are twins, triplets or quadruplets. The man who gets asked most about them is Geneticist Horatio Hackett Newman of the University of Chicago." Newman was also an outspoken defender of evolution, and traveled to Dayton, Tennessee to testify as an expert witness at the Scopes Monkey trial in 1925. He was not permitted to testify in the trial, so his remarks were entered into the court's records instead.
