= Kearny Public Library =

Public library in Kearny, New Jersey

Coordinates: 40.7613°N 74.150°W

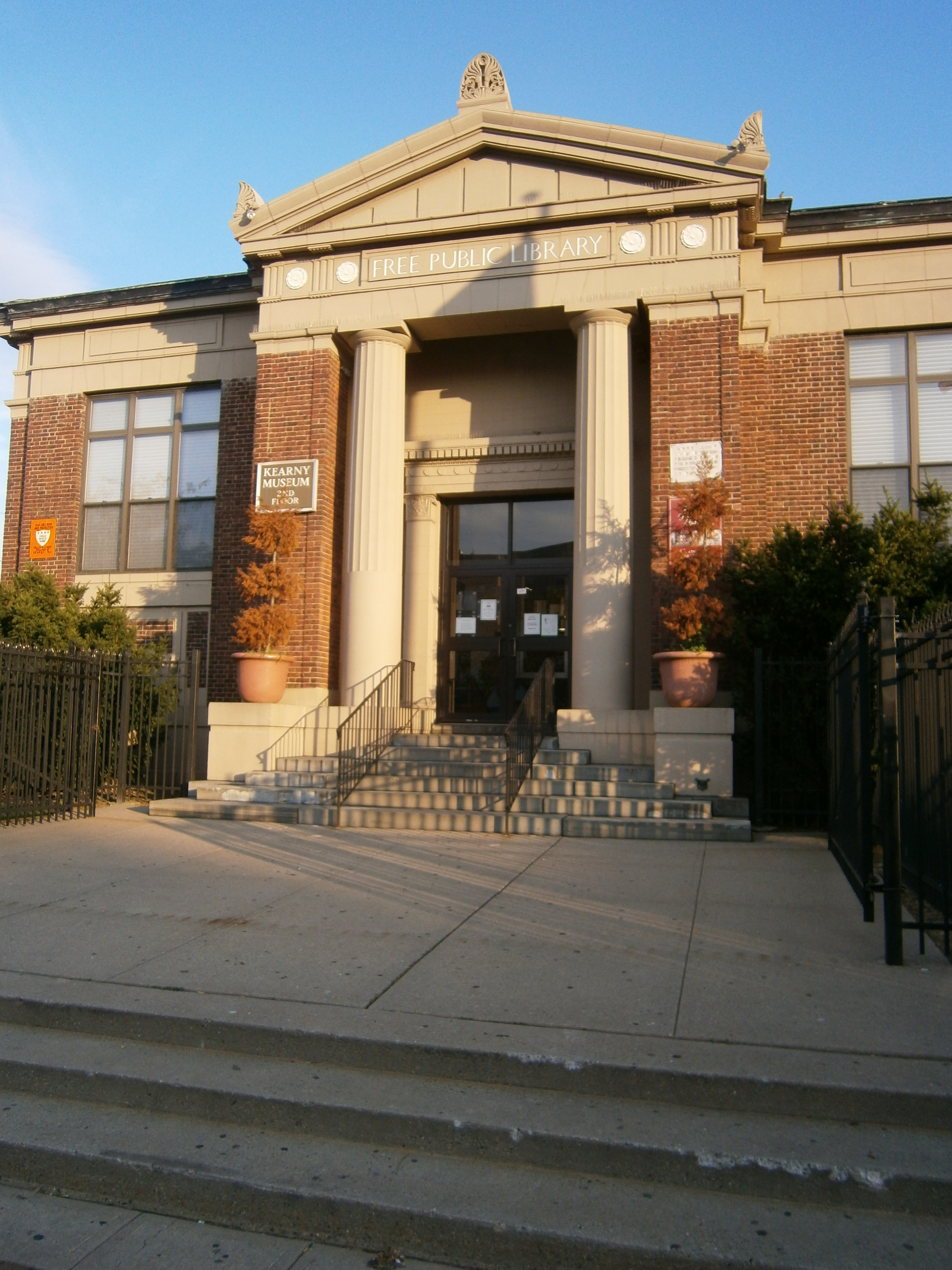
- Main entrance to Kearny Public Library and Kearny Museum
- Location: 318 Kearny Avenue; Kearny, New Jersey, U.S.
- Type: Public library
- Established: 1907
- Architect: Davis, McGrath & Kiessling
- Branches: 1

Collection
- Size: 76,989

Access and use
- Circulation: 79,118
- Population served: 40,684

Other information
- Website: Official website

The Kearny Public Library is the free public library in Kearny, New Jersey. Containing a collection of 76,989 volumes it serves a population of approximately 46,000 from two locations and circulates 79,118 items annually. The main library is one of New Jersey's Carnegie libraries.

The Kearny Museum, on the upper floor of the main library, is a history museum that houses local displays about the town. The collection includes photographs, articles of clothing, and war memorabilia from the town's history. Special attention is given to Civil War hero Major General Philip Kearny Jr. for whom the town is named, including a display of furniture from his Belle Grove home, donated by his granddaughter and second wife. The museum also includes a full collection of Kearny High School yearbooks. The museum has a collection of antique clothes and accessories, representing town life between 1850 and 1960, which were donated or are on loan by townspeople. The museum is staffed by volunteers who curate and arrange the displays. The museum is open on Wednesdays from 6:30 p.m. to 7:30 p.m., and on Saturdays from 10 a.m. to noon. The museum is closed during the summer months of July and August.

== See also ==
- Exhibitions in Hudson County
- List of Carnegie libraries in New Jersey
