= Northbank Center =

- Industrial Savings Bank Building
- U.S. National Register of Historic Places
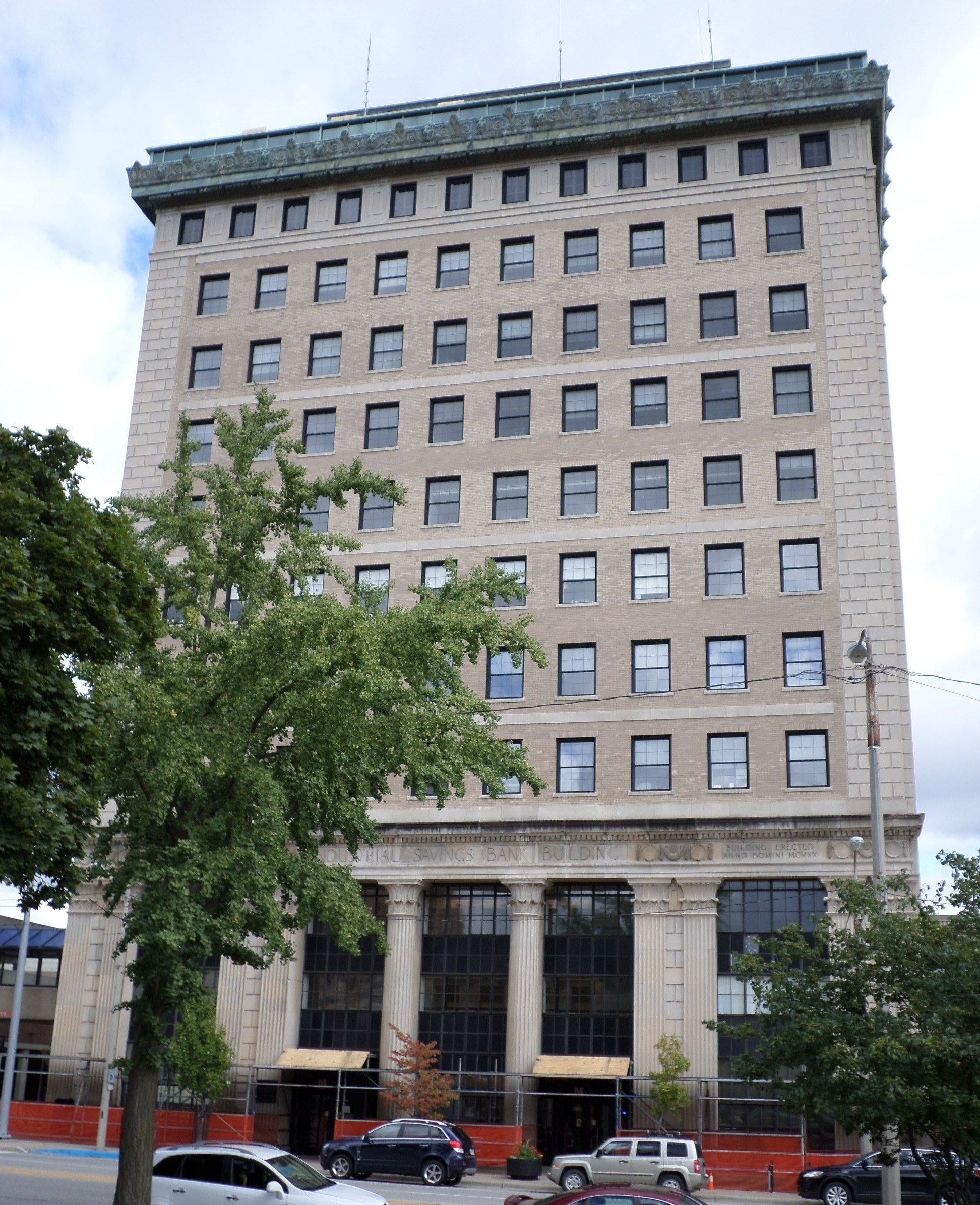
- Interactive map
- Location: 432 N. Saginaw St., Flint, Michigan
- Coordinates: 43°01′12″N 83°41′35″W
- Area: less than one acre
- Built: 1922
- Built by: Realty Construction Co. of Flint
- Architect: Davis, McGrath & Kiessling
- Architectural style: Renaissance Revival
- NRHP reference No.: 84001393
- Added to NRHP: April 19, 1984

The Northbank Center, formerly known as the Industrial Savings Bank Building, is an office and educational building located at 432 North Saginaw Street in Flint, Michigan. The building is now part of University of Michigan–Flint. It was listed on the National Register of Historic Places in 1984.

== History ==
The Industrial Savings Bank was founded in 1909 to serve merchants and factory workers on Flint's north side. However, during Flint's economic boom period in the first two decades of the twentieth century, the bank quickly grew, serving customers citywide. By 1913, the bank was ready to move into a new, larger building. However, it did not close the original location, becoming the first bank in the city to have multiple locations. Soon, Industrial Savings had six branch offices. By 1922, the bank was ready to expand again, and they hired the New York architectural firm of Davis, McGrath & Kiessling to design this building. Construction started in 1922 by the Realty Construction Co. of Flint, and the building was completed in 1923.

In addition to housing the Industrial Savings Bank headquarters, the building also housed the Industrial Mutual Association, an early Flint benefit society. The Industrial Savings Bank flourished during the 1920s, and in 1929 merged with the Union Trust and Savings Bank. The new bank, the Union Industrial Trust and Savings Bank, began construction on a new building (now the home of the Charles Stewart Mott Foundation). The bank continued operations into the Great Depression, but like many banks experienced troubles, and closed permanently in 1933.

The bank's assets, including the 1922 building, were placed in receivership. Several attempts were made to sell the building, but it was not until 1943 that the Greater Flint Industrial Union Council purchased it to use as offices for Congress of Industrial Organizations locals. The building, however, was underutilized, and in 1948 it was sold to a group of investors. Over the next few decades, it housed a variety of businesses, professionals, and governmental offices.

In 1997, the University of Michigan–Flint opted to purchase the building, now known as the Northbank Center. The building was refurbished in 2000, and as of 2018 houses the UM-Flint Dance Studio, various campus and community offices, a small business hatchery, and the Grand Ballroom.

== Description ==
The Northbank Center is a twelve-story, L-shaped, Renaissance Revival building measuring 99 feet by 150 feet, and located on a corner lot. On the main facade, the first three floors form a base, divided into three major bays by paired and fluted pilasters with Corinthian capitals. The pilasters are limestone, with the interior of the bays formed by rusticated granite and multi-pane windows. The base is capped with a limestone architrave, frieze, and cornice with the founding dates and the words "Industrial Savings Bank Building" in the entablature.

The facade above is ten bays wide, with a piano nobile stretched over seven floors. Each bay contains a double-hung sash window. Construction is brick, with a limestone bandcourse every two floors and rusticated granite quoining on the corners. A double-molded bandcourse separates the main section from the upper two floors. The eleventh floor has twelve six-pane casement windows separated by limestone panels. A corniceline is above the eleventh floor, and the twelfth floor is recessed, forming a rooftop terrace, with the twelfth-floor facade nearly invisible from the street level. The twelfth floor similar to the eleventh, but has a stucco finish and a decorative balustrade.

The side facade is eight bays wide at the ground floor. The facade is similar to the main side, but for the elimination of the paired pilasters in the base, and the twelfth floor, which is recessed only in the corner sections.
