= Ben J. Winer =

American psychologist (1917 – 1984)

- Born: June 18, 1917
- Died: May 30, 1984 (aged 66)
- Education: Ohio State University (Ph.D.)
- Known for: Statistical Principles in Experimental Design
- Scientific career
- Fields: Psychology
- Workplaces: Purdue University

Ben James Winer (June 18, 1917 – May 30, 1984) was an American research psychologist and academic. He served as a psychology professor at Purdue University and was president of the Psychometric Society. He has been listed as one of the most highly cited psychologists in the United States, having authored a well-known textbook on statistical analysis.

== Biography ==
Born in Oregon, Winer attended the University of Oregon and he served as a personnel research bureau assistant for the psychology department head, Howard Taylor. He earned a master's degree in psychology from Oregon in 1940 before serving in the military for five years. He held positions with the United States Civil Service Commission and The Pentagon while he took evening graduate courses in statistics at George Washington University.

After briefly attending graduate school at Princeton University, Winer went to Ohio State University, where he earned a Ph.D. in industrial psychology in 1951. He was a postdoctoral fellow at the University of North Carolina and he received joint teaching appointments in statistics and psychology at Purdue University in 1954. He had a full-time appointment in the psychology department by 1956, but statistical analysis remained a strong area of emphasis for him. Working with Andrew Halpin, Winer studied behavioral approaches to leadership. They concluded that two concepts, initiating structure and consideration, characterized the behavior of successful leadership.

Winer was the 1967-68 president of the Psychometric Society. In 1983, he received a Quantitative Methods Teaching Award from the American Psychological Foundation. He authored an influential textbook, Statistical Principles in Experimental Design. The book was reviewed in journals including Educational and Psychological Measurement, Ergonomics and the Journal of the American Statistical Association. In 2002, Winer was ranked fourth on a list of American psychologists most frequently cited in the professional literature; Statistical Principles in Experimental Design remains his most cited work by far.

Upon his death, Winer left a gift to Purdue to further the study of mathematical psychology. The university established a memorial lecture series in his honor. A distinguished professorship at the school was named after him in 1998.
