= C. Allen Thorndike Rice =

American journalist (1851–1889)

Charles Allen Thorndike Rice
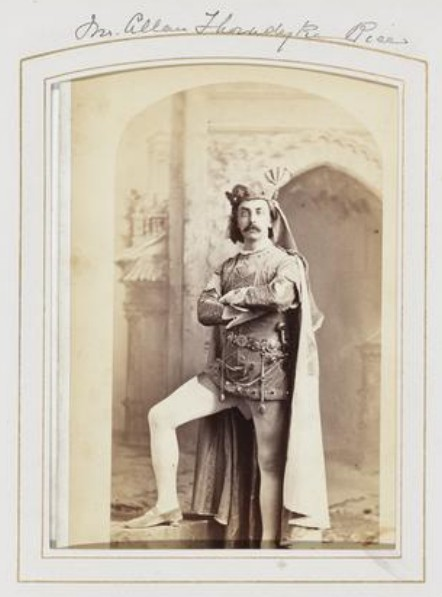
- Rice at a costume ball hosted by William K. Vanderbilt at his home on 5th Avenue in New York City on 26 March 1883
- Born: June 18, 1851; Boston, Massachusetts, U.S.
- Died: May 16, 1889 (aged 37); New York City, U.S.
- Education: Christ Church, University of Oxford, BA & MA degrees
- Years active: 1876–1889
- Known for: editor and publisher of the North American Review
- Parent(s): Henry Gardner Rice and Elizabeth Frances (Thorndike) Rice
- Awards: Chevalier de Légion d'honneur 1880

Charles Allen Thorndike Rice (June 18, 1851 – May 16, 1889) was an American journalist and the editor and publisher of the North American Review from 1876 to 1889.

== Early life and family ==
C. Allen Thorndike Rice was born 18 June 1851 in Boston, Massachusetts as the only son of Henry Gardner Rice (1820–1869), from a Boston publishing family, and Elizabeth Francis (Thorndike) Rice, from a New York publishing family. Rice (known as Charles or Charlie as a child) grew up in the Beacon Hill section of Boston and Baltimore, Maryland, but his parents divorced in 1859, and a child custody dispute ensued. Custody was eventually awarded to his father by a Maryland Court and upheld by an 1 August 1860 decision by Justice George Bigelow of the Massachusetts Supreme Judicial Court. In retaliation, Elizabeth Thorndike Rice arranged for a kidnapping of Charlie in the summer of 1860 when he was in Nahant, Massachusetts. The kidnapping was witnessed by nine-year-old Charlie's school mate, Henry Cabot Lodge, who testified to the authorities leading to the capture of the kidnappers. However, Elizabeth was able to escape to Canada with Charlie disguised as a girl. They eventually moved to France and Germany and resided there for several years. In 1866, Rice's mother Elizabeth died and he was able to rejoin his father in Boston. In 1869, Rice's father Henry died, and Rice returned to Europe for his education. He graduated from University of Oxford with a BA degree in 1874, and earned his MA degree there in 1878. He never married.

== Professional career ==
C. Allen Thorndike Rice (known as Allen in later life) began his career in 1876 when he purchased the North American Review for $3000, and he established himself as the publisher and editor-in-chief. The magazine provided an outlet for his interest in writing, as he was a frequent contributor. In 1879, he became interested in international exploration, so he contributed funds to enable the Charnay Expedition to explore and photograph Mayan ruins in Mexico and Guatemala. On the return of the expedition, Rice wrote an account in 1880 entitled Ruined Cities of Central America that publicized and popularized the effort. That year he was awarded the Chevalier de Légion d'honneur by French President Jules Grévy.

Rice ran as a Republican in the election of 1886 against General Francis Barretto Spinola for New York's 10th congressional district seat in the U.S. House of Representatives. He lost the race and he subsequently alleged electoral fraud in the process. Rice then dedicated himself to the cause of promoting the use of the secret ballot in the United States. In 1889, he was appointed as Minister to Russia by President Benjamin Harrison but he died at a hotel in New York City on 16 May 1889 prior to assuming his post.

== Literary References ==
Rice appears (his name partially disguised) in A Doffed Coronet, an anonymous 1902 roman à clef authored by Marguerite Cunliffe-Owen.

== Selected publications ==
Reminiscences of Abraham Lincoln by Distinguished Men of His Time Allen Thorndike Rice (ed.) 1888 The North American Review Publishing Company

- Rice, Allen Thorndike. 1880. Ruined Cities of Central America North American Review. 131:89-108.
- Rice, Allen Thorndike. 1886. Recent Reforms in Balloting. North American Review 143:628–43.
- Rice, Allen Thorndike (ed.). 1888. Reminiscences of Abraham Lincoln by Distinguished Men of His Time. The North American Review Publishing Company, New York.

== Genealogy ==
Charles Allen Thorndike Rice was a direct descendant of Edmund Rice, an English immigrant to Massachusetts Bay Colony, as follows:

- Charles Allen Thorndike Rice, son of
  - Henry Gardner Rice (ca1820 – 1869), son of

  - Henry Gardner Rice (1784 – 1853), son of
  - Dr. Tilly Rice (1756 – 1824), son of
  - Capt. Tilly Rice (1724 – 1803), son of

      - Obadiah Rice (1698 – ?), son of
      - Jacob Rice (1660 – 1746), son of
      - Edward Rice (1622 – 1711), son of

      - Edmund Rice (1594 – 1663)

Charles Allen Thorndike Rice was also a descendant of John Thorndike, an English immigrant to Massachusetts Bay Colony.
