= Richard Minshull =

English academic (died 1686)

Richard Minshull or Minshall (died 1686) was an English academic, Master of Sidney Sussex College, Cambridge from 1643.

== Life ==
He was baptised in St Clement Danes, London. He matriculated at Sidney Sussex College in 1616, and graduated B.A. in 1620. He graduated M.A. in 1623; he received the higher degrees of B.D. in 1630 and D.D. in 1644.

He was elected to the mastership in a close contest, and the first for which the Fellows had chosen, the previous Masters having been outside nominees. On 13 September 1643 eleven Fellows met in the college chapel. The candidates were one of them external, Herbert Thorndike of Trinity College, Cambridge, and Minshull who was a Fellow of Sidney. Herbert was a royalist, while Minshull had the backing of Oliver Cromwell, a college contemporary. The matter hung in the balance but was settled by the intervention of the troops of Edward Montagu, 2nd Earl of Manchester, in command of the Eastern Association covering the area for Parliament since August of that year. Despite the strong-arm tactics employed, Charles I confirmed the appointment and Minshull continued in the post for the rest of his life. He was vice-chancellor of the university in 1652.

== Notes ==
Academic offices
Preceded by Samuel Ward	Master of Sidney Sussex College, Cambridge; 1643-1686	Succeeded by Joshua Bassett
