= Applewood Estate (Flint, Michigan) =

- Applewood
- U.S. National Register of Historic Places
- Michigan State Historic Site
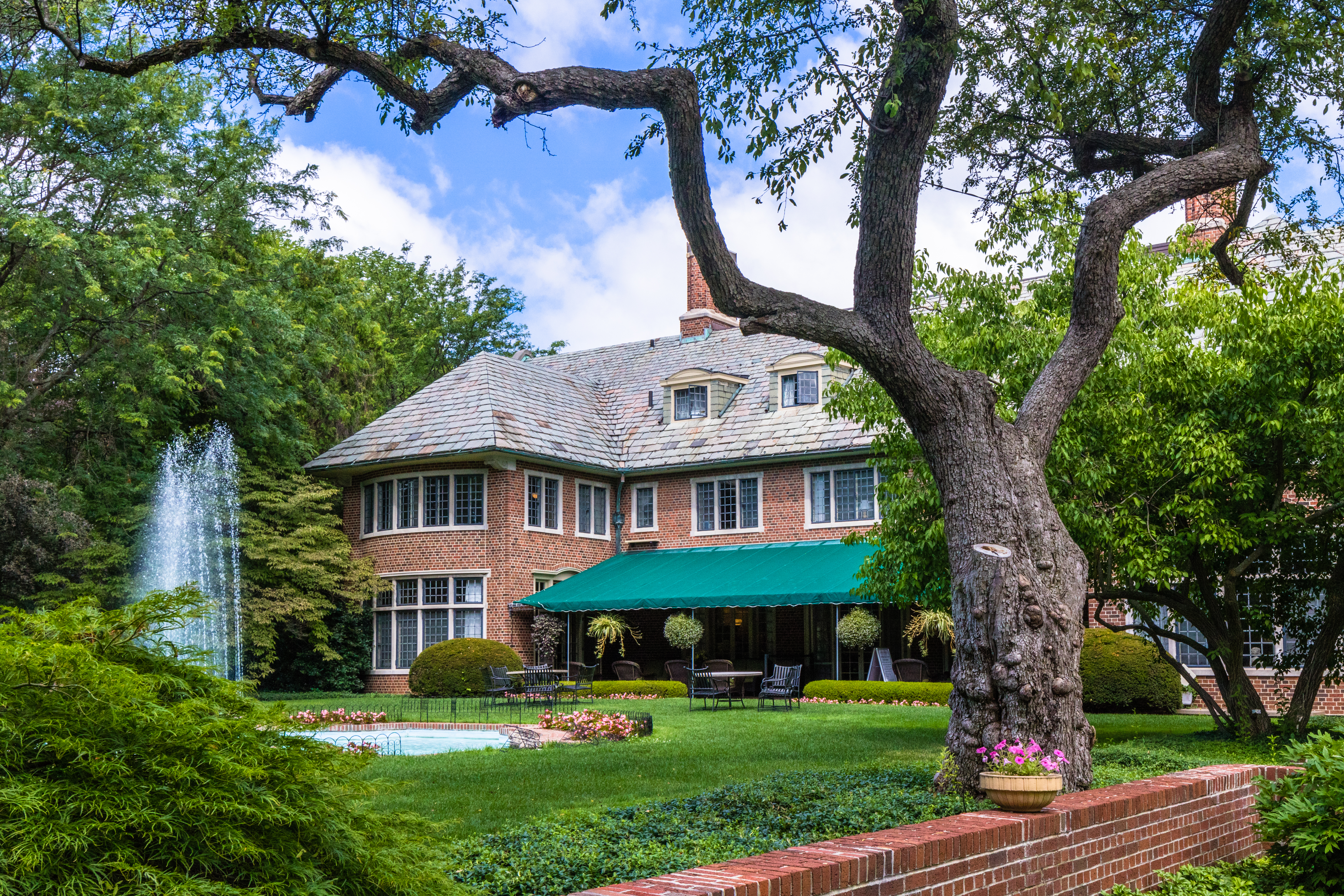
- Applewood Estate in 2017
- Interactive map
- Location: 1400 E. Kearsley St. Flint, Michigan
- Coordinates: 43°01′26″N 83°40′24″W
- Area: 16.5 acres (6.7 ha)
- Built: 1916
- Architect: Davis, McGrath & Kiessling; William Pitkin Jr.
- Architectural style: Tudor Revival, Jacobethan Revival
- NRHP reference No.: 79001152
- Added to NRHP: April 16, 1979

Applewood Estate, also known as the Charles Stewart Mott House, is the former residence of Charles Stewart Mott. It was listed on the National Register of Historic Places in 1979.

== History ==
Charles Stewart Mott was born in 1875 in Newark, New Jersey, to cider and vinegar producer John Mott. The family moved to New York City in 1880, then returned to New Jersey in 1888. In 1892, Mott began studying at the Stevens Institute of Technology, and graduated in 1897. He then joined his father's business. After his father died in 1899, Mott's interest turned to other businesses, and he joined Weston-Mott of Utica, New York, a manufacturer of wire wheels owned by his father and uncle. In 1903, Mott took over the firm, steering it to produce wheels and axle assemblies for the fledgling automobile industry. He began doing business with William C. Durant and Josiah Dallas Dort owners of Buick, and in 1906 moved the company to Flint. By 1908 he was doing over $2 million worth of business.

Mott's company was soon the largest axle manufacturer in the world, and William Durant's General Motors purchased the company in return for nearly $3 million in GM stock; Mott went on to serve as a member of GM's Board of Directors until 1967. He was also involved in the community, serving as Flint's mayor in 1913, 1914, and 1918, and contributed greatly to the community through his philanthropic foundation.

In 1916, Mott and his wife Ethel Culbert Harding (whom he had married in 1903), decided to build a home for their family. They purchased 26 acres from J. D. Dort and 38 additional acres from Durant. Mott hired his sister's husband Herbert E. Davis of the New York architectural firm Davis, McGrath & Kiessling to design and build the home, and the Boston firm of William Pitkin Jr. to do the landscape design. The main portion of the estate was done in 1916, but additions were made for several years.

After the family moved in, the estate was set up like a gentleman's farm. However, this was cut short when Ethel Harding Mott died in 1924. Charles Mott married three more times; the first two of which were short-lived. His last marriage was to Ruth Matt Rawlings in 1934. They continued to live on the estate. The farm was discontinued in the 1940s, and Mott donated some of the lands to expand what is now Mott Community College. Charles Stewart Mott lived at Applewood until his death in 1973. Ruth Mott stayed until her death in 1999. After her death, she left money to the Ruth Mott Foundation, which owns and maintains Applewood Estate.

== Description ==
Applewood Estate residence is a Jacobethan Revival structure located in a landscaped, rolling lawn among mature trees. The house is constructed of brick, with a slate roof. The front facade is symmetrical, and divided into three distinct bays. The center bay projects, and contains a modest doorway flanked with modified Doric pilasters and topped with a rounded-arch pediment. The roof above contains three gable dormers. The windows in the facade are rectangular and divided into rectangular panes by stone mullions. The rear of the building has a similar massing and window layout as the front. It is also three bays wide, with the end bays projecting, and topped with a small gable. In the center bay, three sets of double doors open onto the patio.

Also on the grounds are a greenhouse, a garage, a large bred brick barn, a chicken coop, and a gatekeepers cottage. These structures were designed by the same architect as the main house, and are built in the same style.
