= Greenland, West Virginia =

- Unincorporated community
- Location within West Virginia Location within the United States
- Coordinates: 39°11′31″N 79°9′11″W
- Country: United States
- State: West Virginia
- County: Grant
- Time zone: UTC-5 (Eastern (EST))
  - Summer (DST): UTC-4 (EDT)
- GNIS feature ID: 1549717

Greenland is an unincorporated community between Walker's Ridge and New Creek Mountain on the North Fork Patterson Creek in Grant County, West Virginia, United States. Greenland lies at the western end of Greenland Gap in New Creek Mountain.

The community most likely was named for their green land at and around the original town site.

== Notable people ==
Notable people that were born or lived in Greenland include:

- Quinn McNemar (1901–1986), psychologist and statistician
