= Civic Park Historic District =

- U.S. National Register of Historic Places
- U.S. Historic district
- Michigan State Historic Site
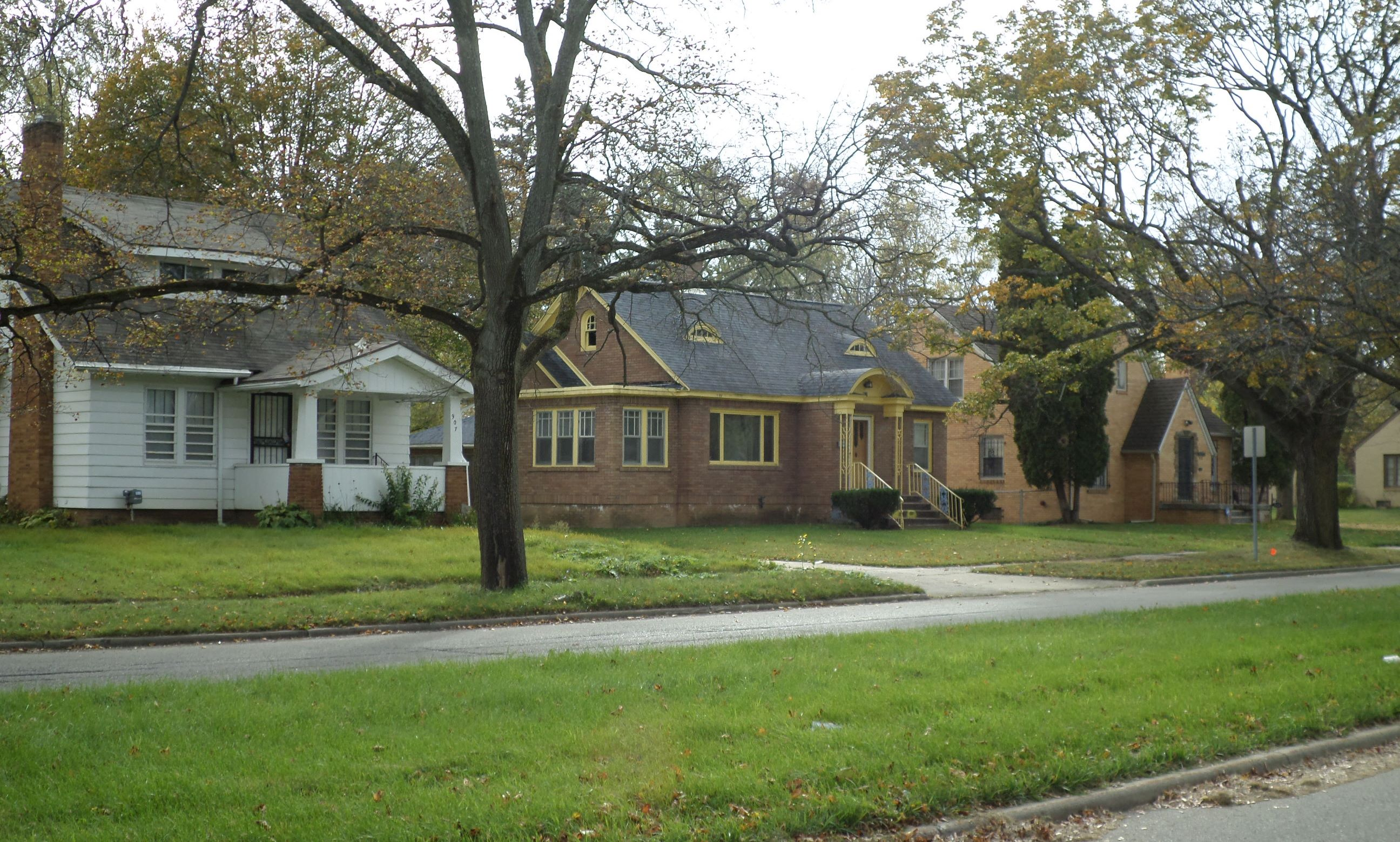
- Interactive map
- Location: Roughly bounded by Welch and Brownell Blvds., Trumbull Ave., Dupont and Dartmouth Sts., Flint, Michigan
- Coordinates: 43°02′15″N 83°43′11″W
- Area: 280 acres (110 ha)
- Built: 1919
- Architect: Davis, McGrath & Kiessling; William Pitkin
- Architectural style: Late 19th And Early 20th Century American Movements, Late 19th And 20th Century Revivals, Bungalow/craftsman
- NRHP reference No.: 79001153
- Added to NRHP: September 7, 1979

The Civic Park Historic District is a primarily residential historic district roughly bounded by Welch and Brownell Boulevards Trumbull Avenue, Dupont Street, and Dartmouth Street, in Flint, Michigan. It was listed on the National Register of Historic Places in 1979.

== History ==
In 1917, number of prominent Flint business people formed the Civic Building Association to promote the construction of new housing in the crowded city. The Association purchased 400 acres of land, hired Boston landscape architect William Pitkin to lay out a neighborhood, and retained the New York firm of Davis, McGrath & Kiessling to develop house plans for the site. However, the Association's plans collapsed, due in part to shortages created by World War I. After the conclusion of the war, though, the housing shortage in Flint became even more acute as workers flocked to the booming automobile plants, primarily those of General Motors. recognizing that a shortage in housing limited their opportunity to grow, in February 1919 GM established the Modern Housing Corporation to provide housing for its workers. The Corporation purchased the land already set aside by the Civic Building Association, and almost immediately announced plans for development. They used the plans originally developed by Pitkin and the house designs by Davis, McGrath & Kiessling, and by April 1919 construction began. In five months, an entire neighborhood of over 600 homes were constructed.

General Motors promoted the neighborhood to its employees, offering incentives for purchasing a pre-built home or for constructing a custom one. By January 1920, 950 homes were built within the neighborhood, and the houses were nearly completely filled by early spring. The economic downturn of 1920, and the cost overruns experienced in the construction of Civic Park, dissuaded GM from continuing with its home construction. However, in 1923, Modern Housing Corporation constructed a community center in the neighborhood as part of a deal worked out with the city of Flint. After that time development in the neighborhood was slow with only about 60 structures built over the next few decades, including the Civic Park Community School and two small commercial areas.

== Description ==
The Civic Park Historic District contains about 1010 structures, of which 950 are original to the 1919-1920 construction period. The lots are generally 50 feet by 100 feet, and the houses are 1-1/2 and two-story bungalows of four to seven rooms in size. The exteriors of the houses are clad in brick, stucco, or wood. The original homes are primarily of 28 types designed by Davis, McGrath & Kiessling. About 80 of the original homes were constructed by GM employees using their own plans. These houses complement the others in size, color, texture, and overall appearance.

Also included in the neighborhood is the 1923 Haskell Community Center, the Civic Park Community School, and two churches.
