= Modern Housing Corporation Addition Historic District =

- U.S. National Register of Historic Places
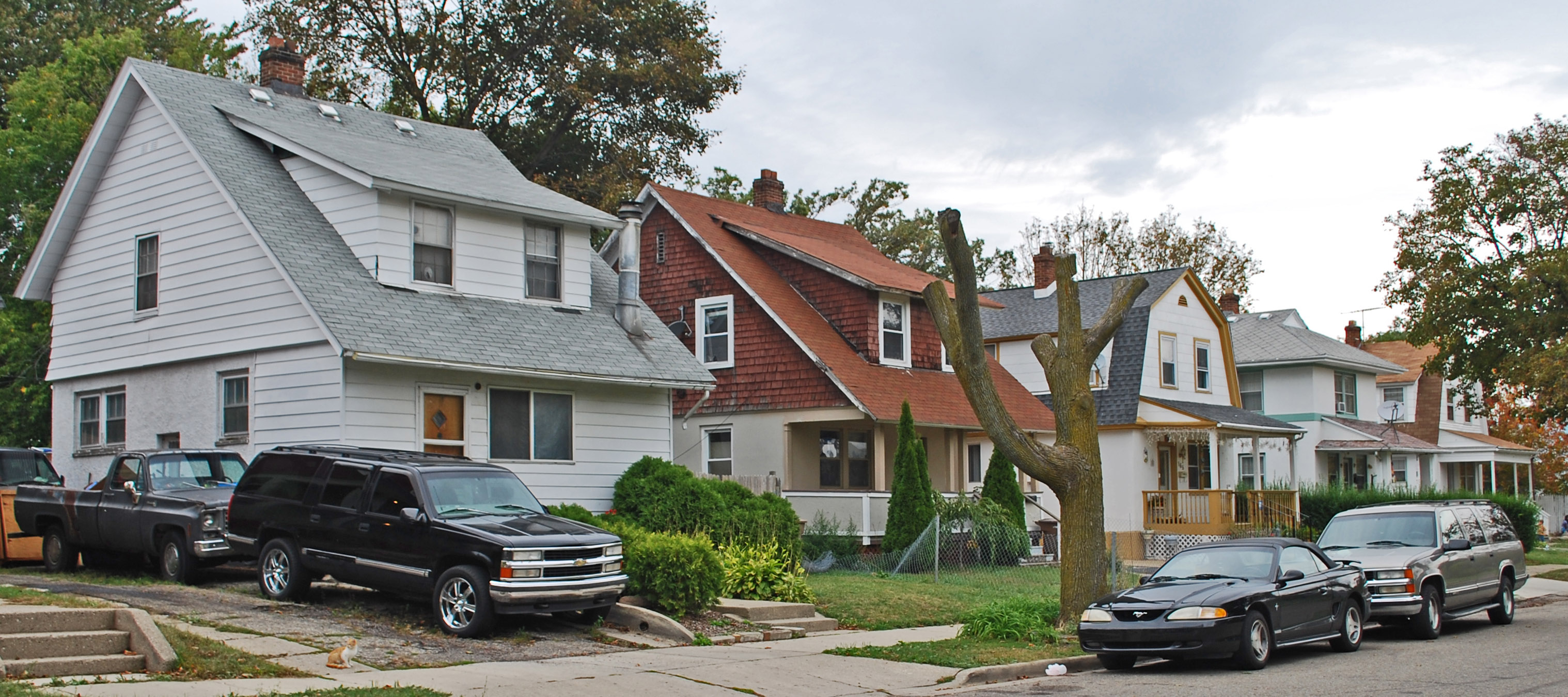
- Interactive map
- Location: Roughly bounded by Montcalm St., Perry St., Joslyn Ave., Gage St., Glenwood, and Nelson St., Pontiac, Michigan
- Coordinates: 42°39′13″N 83°16′44″W
- Area: 57 acres (23 ha)
- Built: 1919
- Architectural style: Colonial Revival, Bungalow/craftsman
- NRHP reference No.: 89000490
- Added to NRHP: June 9, 1989

The Modern Housing Corporation Addition Historic District is a residential historic district located in Pontiac, Michigan and roughly bounded by Montcalm Street, Perry Street, Joslyn Avenue, Gage Street, Glenwood Street, and Nelson Street. It was listed on the National Register of Historic Places in 1989.

== History ==
At the close of World War I, demand for automobiles exploded, and in 1919 General Motors found that it could not keep up with the demand. This was in part due to a critical housing shortage near its plant in Pontiac: although the company could find workers, the workers could not find any housing. In response, GM established the Modern Housing Corporation. The company first began developing 750 houses on a 660-acre parcel just southwest of the current district, and in October 1919 continued by platting the Modern Housing Corporation Addition. The neighborhood was developed under the leadership of Pierre S. du Pont, then Chairman of GM's board of directors. Du Pont commissioned William Pitkin of Boston to lay out the streets of the neighborhood, and Davis, McGrath & Kiessling of New York to design the homes. Construction began immediately. General Motors promoted the housing to its employees, offering financial incentives and reduced down payments. By 1923, over 80% of the lots in the addition had homes built on them, and by 1926 the construction was substantially complete.

Although the neighborhood declined as Pontiac's fortunes sank, it has recently seen an upturn.

== Description ==
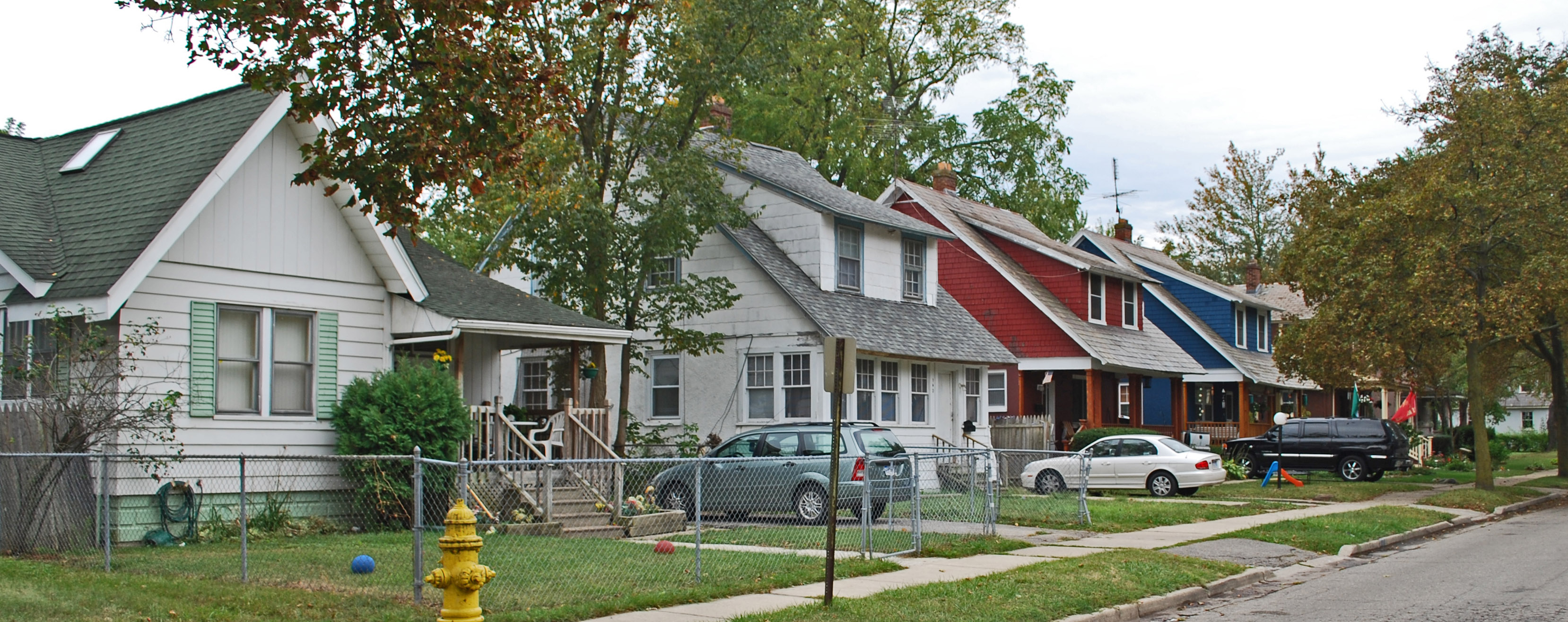

The Modern Housing Corporation Addition contains 261 modest homes, along with three public spaces, in a 61-acre tract. All but 12 of the houses are built from one of 16 architectural patterns. The lots are generally 50 feet by 100 feet, with houses of one to two stories and two to four bedrooms, finished with clapboard, wood shingle, stucco and brick. Many of the two-story houses have different materials on each story.

== See also ==
- National Register of Historic Places listings in Oakland County, Michigan
