= Nathanael Ball =

English clergyman

Nathanael Ball (1623 – 8 September 1681) was an English clergyman, an assistant to Brian Walton in his London Polyglot Bible.

== Life ==
He was born at Pitminster, near Taunton Dean, Somerset. He was educated at Merchant Taylors' School before entering King's College, Cambridge, where he had a name as a scholar.

He also spoke French idiomatically. While at university he gained the friendship of John Tillotson. Having taken the degrees of B.A. and M.A., he received orders, and was settled at Barley, Hertfordshire, a living recently sequestered from Herbert Thorndike.

He married there the daughter of a neighbouring clergyman named Parr, by whom he had ten sons and three daughters. Thorndike in 1658–9 recovered his living, and Ball was ejected. For some time he stayed in his parish, and then moved to Royston as a minister. But after the Act of Uniformity 1662 he resigned the office. He did not immediately leave Royston, but preached in the neighbourhood and elsewhere, as opportunities offered. He later retired to Little Chishill, of which parish his brother-in-law, Robert Parr, became the rector soon after the ejection of James Willett. While at Chishill he acted as an evangelist in the town and parish, and at Epping, Cambridge, Bayford, and other places.

In 1668 he took part with Stephen Scandrett, Barnard, Havers, Coleman, and Billio in two public disputes with George Whitehead, a Quaker. In 1669 he was returned to Archbishop Gilbert Sheldon as a 'teacher to a conventicle at Thaxted, in connection with Scambridge [Scandaret] and Billoway [Billio].' On the 'Declaration' of 1672 he was described as of Nether Chishill, and obtained a licence (25 May 1672) to be a 'general presbyterian teacher in any allowed place.' In June 1672 his own house was licensed to be a presbyterian meeting-place, and he himself was licensed in August to be a 'presbyterian teacher in his own house' there. He lived 'in a small cottage of forty shillings a year rent,' and frequently suffered for nonconformity. He died on 8 September 1681, aged 58.

== Legacy ==
He left his manuscripts to Thomas Gouge, of St. Sepulchre's, London, who died only a few weeks after him. They came into the possession of John Faldo, another ejected minister, who published a volume by Ball entitled 'Spiritual Bonndage and Freedom; or a Treatise containing the Substance of several Sermons preached on that subject from John viii. 36, 1683.' It is dedicated to 'the right honourable and truly virtuous the Lady Archer, of Coopersail, in Essex.'

Ball also wrote 'Christ the Hope of Glory, several Sermons on Colossians i. 27, 1692.' His Biblical and oriental manuscripts and his correspondence were lost.
