= Quinn McNemar =

American psychologist and statistician (1900–1986)

- Born: February 20, 1900; Greenland, West Virginia, United States
- Died: July 3, 1986 (aged 86); Palo Alto, California
- Education: Juniata College; Stanford University
- Known for: McNemar's test Revising the Stanford-Binet IQ test
- Scientific career
- Fields: psychology, statistics
- Workplaces: Stanford University; University of Texas
- Doctoral advisor: Lewis Terman

Quinn Michael McNemar (February 20, 1900 – July 3, 1986) was an American psychologist and statistician. He is known for his work on IQ tests, for his book Psychological Statistics (1949) and for McNemar's test, the statistical test he introduced in 1947.

== Life ==
McNemar was born in Greenland, West Virginia in 1900. He obtained his bachelor's degree in mathematics in 1925 from Juniata College, studied for his doctorate in psychology under Lewis Terman at Stanford University, and joined the faculty at Stanford in 1931. In 1942 he published The Revision of the Stanford–Binet Scale, the IQ test released in 1916 by Terman. By the time he retired from Stanford in 1965 he held professorships in psychology, statistics and education. He taught for another five years at the University of Texas before retiring to Palo Alto, where he died in 1986.

He was president of the Psychometric Society in 1951 and of the American Psychological Association in 1964.
