= Davis, McGrath & Kiessling =

American architectural firm

Davis, McGrath & Kiessling was an architecture firm formed as a partnership of Herbert E. Davis, Dudley McGrath and Calvin Kiessling (previously Davis & Shepard and Davis, McGrath & Shepard), that was active between 1910 and 1921. The New York firm specialized in design of homes and public buildings on the East Coast of the United States, with an emphasis on the "Italian Renaissance Revival" and "Jacobethan Revival" styles. A number of its works are listed on the National Register of Historic Places.

== History ==
The New York firm of Davis, McGrath and Kiessling existed as a partnership from 1910 until 1921 and located at 175 Fifth Avenue (in the Flatiron Building). Herbert E. Davis, who was born in Newark, was a graduate of the Massachusetts Institute of Technology and was resident of Glen Ridge from 1910 until 1929 and designed numerous houses in Glen Ridge and Montclair. Dudley McGrath, a Brooklyn native who attended Columbia University, was an active member of the New York chapter of the American Institute of Architects and was well known in the field of residential design until his death in 1922. Calvin Kiessling, who was born in Boston and began his career with Shepley, Rutan and Coolidge, left the firm in 1921 and moved to New Canaan, Connecticut, where he was credited with initiating the use of Colonial Revival architecture in the New Canaan business district. Prior to their partnership, Kiessling designed a number of Carnegie libraries, including the Colorado Springs Public Library (extant) and the Davenport Public Library (demolished in 1966, and replaced by a library designed by Edward Durell Stone).

== Structures ==
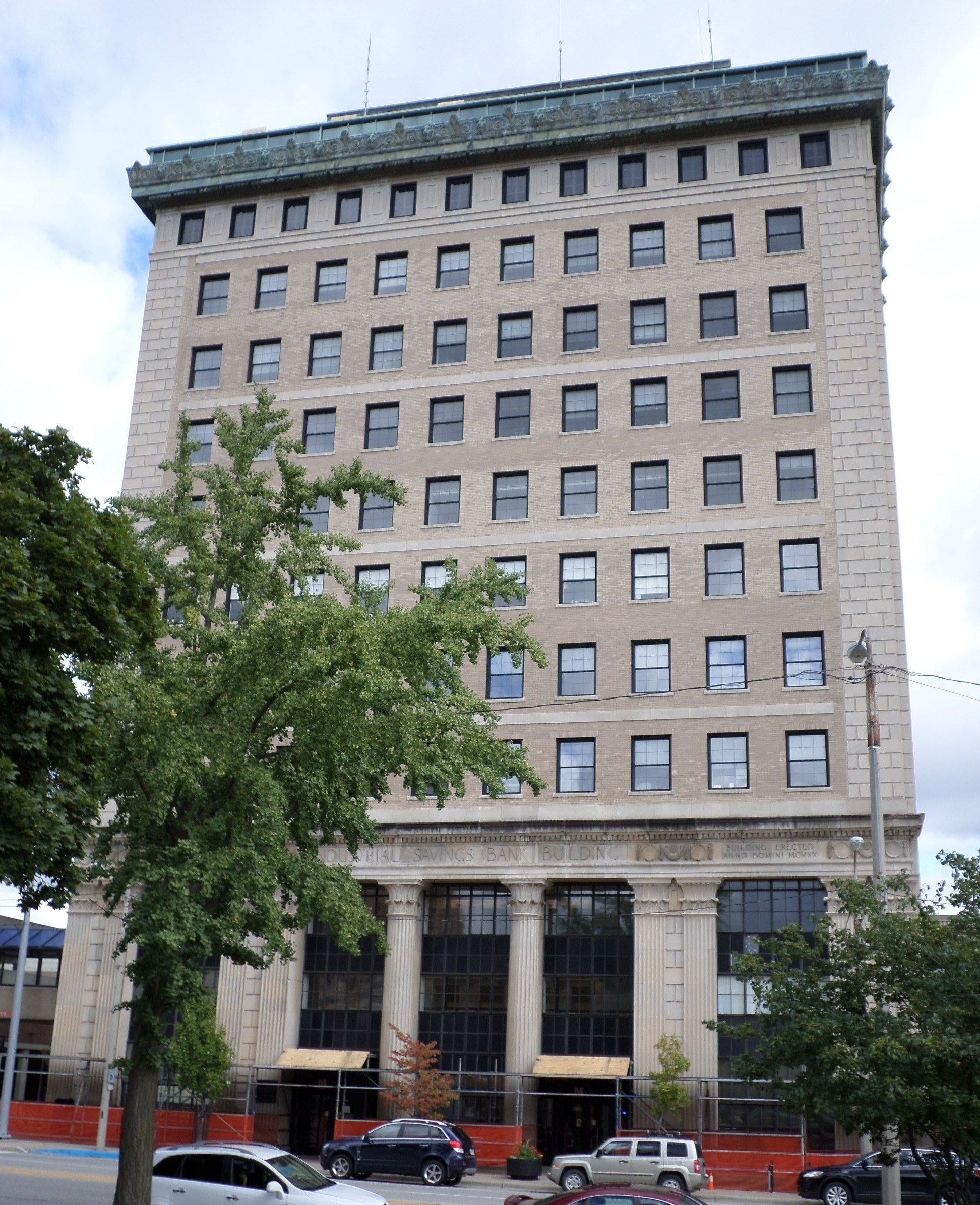
Industrial Savings Bank Building, 2014

The following is a list of structures designed by the firm, ordered by state and locality:

=== Massachusetts ===
- Brookline:
  - Brookline House, c. 1911

=== Michigan ===
- Flint:
  - Charles Stewart Mott House (known as Applewood), 1400 E. Kearsley St., 1916 (NRHP-listed)
  - Civic Building Association, 1919 (NRHP-district)
  - Industrial Savings Bank Building, 1922 (NRHP-listed)
- Pontiac
  - Modern Housing Corporation, 1919 (NRHP-district)

=== New Jersey ===
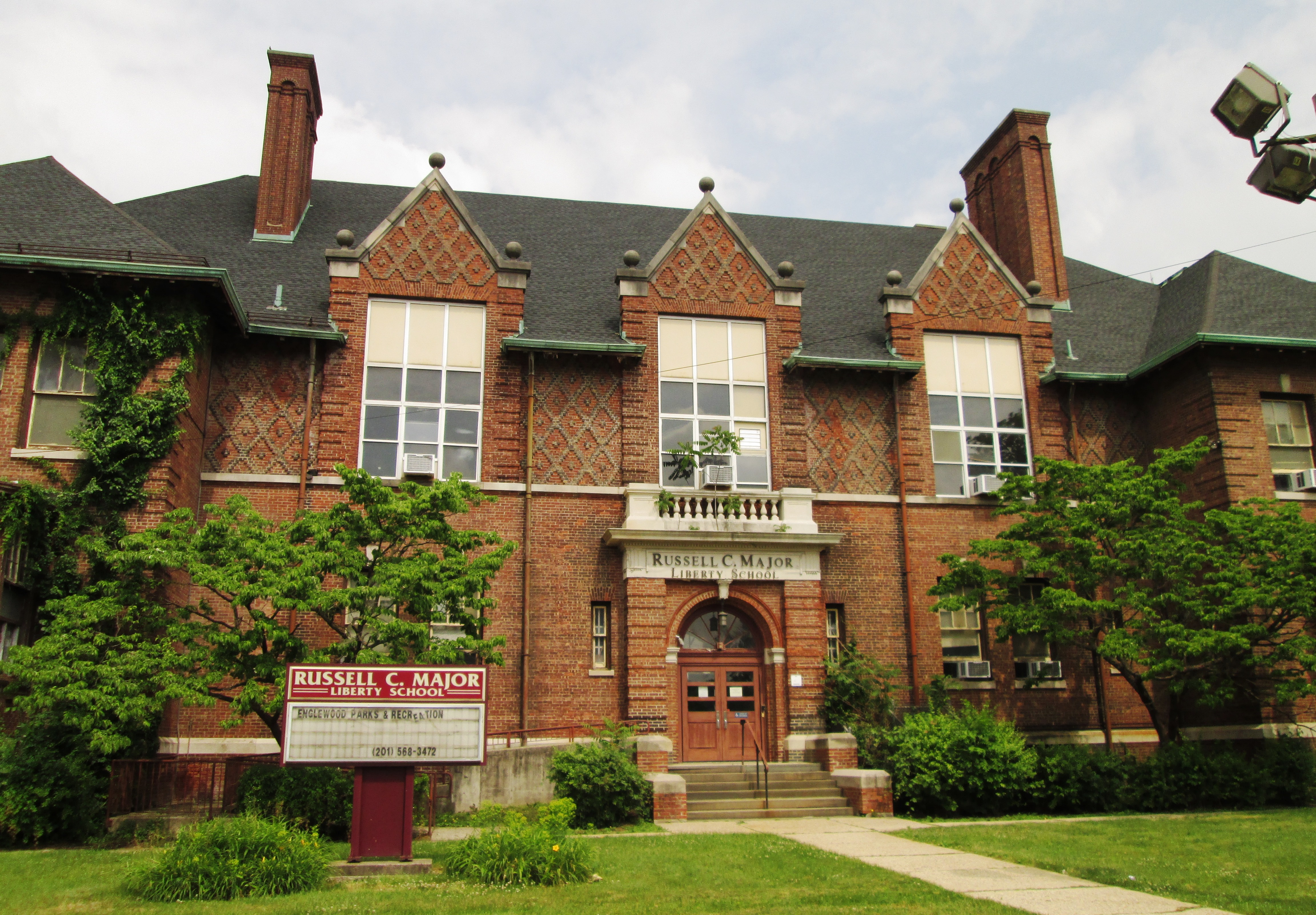
Liberty School, Englewood

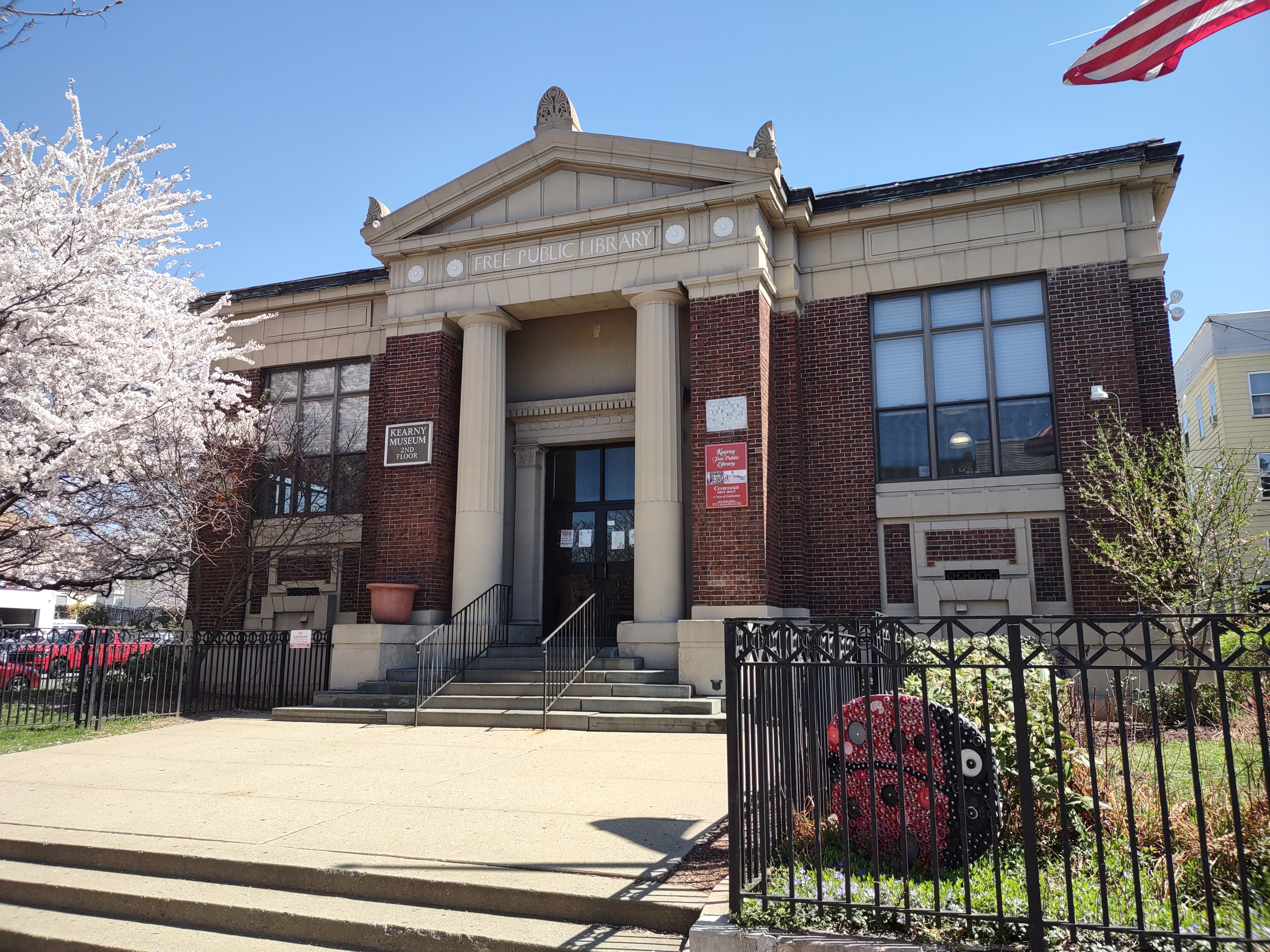
Kearny Public Library, Kearny

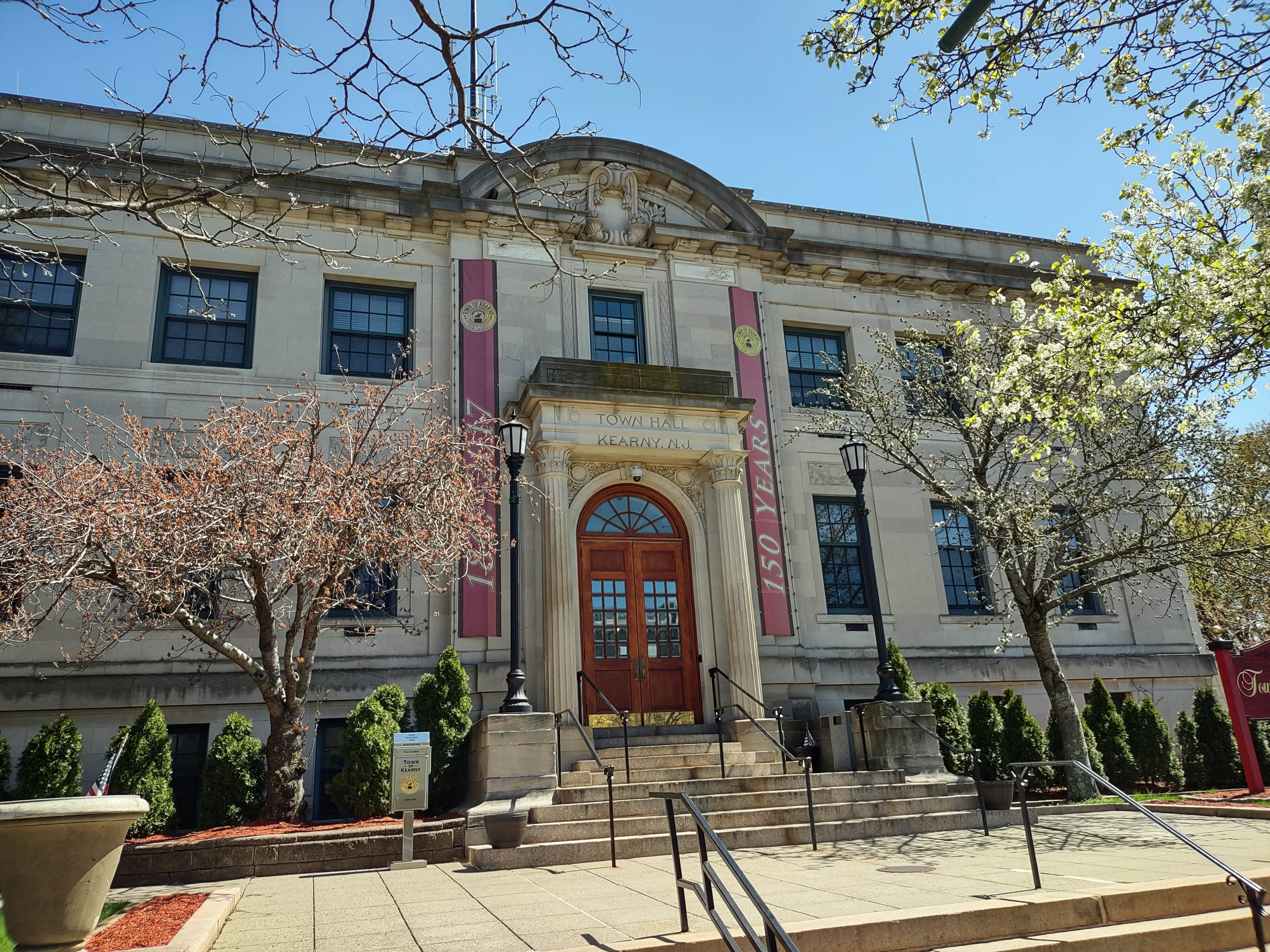
Kearny Town Hall, Kearny

- Englewood:
  - Liberty School (12 Tenafly Rd.), 1902 (as Herbert C. Davis) (Note: Today, the Liberty School is known as the Russell C. Major Liberty School, and houses the administrative offices of the Englewood Public School District. The building, however, is being proposed as a magnate school to be known as the Liberty School for the Arts.)
  - Highwood Firehouse (as Davis & Shepard)
  - Nordhoff Firehouse (as Davis & Shepard)
  - Dan Fellows Platt House (200 Booth Ave.), c. 1909
  - Gaines House (251 Linden Ave.), 1909
  - F. M. Burr House (140 S. Woodland St.), c. 1916
  - H. N. Flanagan House (280 Mountain Rd.), c. 1916
  - William M. Probst House (300 Linden Ave.)
  - Henry W. Blake House (377 Walnut St.)
  - Benjamin F. Reinmund House (104 N. Woodland St.)
  - Lewis D. Mowry (184 Dwight Pl.)
  - Arthur Johnson House (256 Lydecker St.), 1916
  - A. J. Post House (64-72 Dwight Pl.)
  - William M. Probst House (83 Linden Ave.) (Note: The second house designed for William A. Probst, this residence was praised in Aymar Embury II's 1909 book One Hundred Country Houses.)
- Glen Ridge:
  - H. W. Crowell House, c. 1909
  - H. M. Edwards House, c. 1911
  - Glen Ridge Country Club, c. 1916
- Kearny:
  - Kearny Public Library, 1907 (as Davis and Kiessling)
  - Kearny Town Hall, 1909
- Montclair:
  - Guerrieri House (80 Lloyd Rd.), 1916
- South Orange:
  - Clarence Bonynge House, c. 1916 (NRHP-district contributing property)
  - John McElroy House, c. 1916 (NRHP-district contributing property)

=== New York ===
- New York City:
  - St. John's Catholic Church, Kingsbridge, Bronx, 1904
  - Ashley Horace Thorndike House, (4643 Waldo Ave. Riverdale, Bronx), 1913
