= Sophia Rabe-Hesketh =

American statistician

Sophia Rabe-Hesketh is a statistician who works as a professor in the Department of Educational Statistics and Biostatistics at the University of California, Berkeley. Her research involves the development of generalized linear mixed models of data that incorporate latent variables to handle hidden data.

Rabe-Hesketh earned a bachelor's degree in physics from King's College London in 1988. She completed her doctorate at King's College, also in theoretical physics, in 1992. Her dissertation concerned image analysis. After postdoctoral studies at the University of Leeds, she returned to King's College as a reader in statistics in the Department of Biostatistics and Computing, part of the Institute of Psychiatry there. She moved to Berkeley in 2003, with an additional part-time professorship at the University of London from 2006 to 2012. She became president of the Psychometric Society in 2014.

She is the author or co-author of multiple books, including The Analysis of Proximity Data (1997, with B. S. Everitt), Analyzing Medical Data using S-PLUS (2001, with B. S. Everitt), Generalized Latent Variable Modeling: Multilevel, Longitudinal and Structural Equation Models (2004, with A. Skrondal), A Handbook of Statistical Analyses Using Stata (4th ed., 2006, with B. S. Everitt), and Multilevel and Longitudinal Modeling Using Stata (3rd ed., in two vols., with A. Skrondal).

In 2014 she was elected as a Fellow of the American Statistical Association "for groundbreaking contributions to the field of generalized linear latent and mixed models for analysis of complex data in medicine, education, and the social sciences; for development of computational software; and for service to the profession." In 2015 she was elected to the National Academy of Education.
