= Frances Cope =

American mathematician

Elizabeth Frances Cope (née Thorndike; August 19, 1902 – May 14, 1982), was an American mathematician who published on irregular differential equations. The Thorndike nomogram, a two-dimensional diagram of the Poisson distribution, is named for her.

== Education and career ==
Frances Cope was born in New York City to Elizabeth (Moulton) Thorndike and Edward L. Thorndike, an educational psychologist who taught at Teachers College, Columbia University.

She was educated at Horace Mann School in New York and at Drum Hill High School in Peekskill. She graduated from Vassar College in 1922 and earned her master's degree in mathematics from Columbia University in 1925. In a 1926 paper, she first published a two-dimensional diagram of the Poisson distribution that is now named the Thorndike nomogram after her.

She worked for several years as an engineering assistant at American Telephone and Telegraph Company (1922–24, 1925–27) before becoming an instructor of physics at Vassar (1927–28). She spent the 1928–29 academic year as a fellow working towards a Ph.D. at Radcliffe College, where she met fellow mathematician Thomas Freeman Cope; they married in 1929.

In 1930, Cope and her husband moved to Ohio (where he had a job at Marietta College), and two years later she completed her doctorate at Radcliffe as a student of George David Birkhoff. The subject of her Ph.D. thesis was formal solutions of irregular differential equations, and the publications that came out of it continue to be cited in the literature of both mathematics and physics.

Cope taught mathematics as an instructor at Vassar in 1935–36. In 1937 the Copes moved to New York, where she was an instructor of math at Queens College in 1941 and Adelphi College from 1941 to 1943.

She died in Montrose, New York.

== Personal life ==
Frances and Thomas had three children, a son and two daughters. Thomas survived Frances by two years.
