= Lyle Jones =

American psychologist (1924–2016)

- Born: Lyle Vincent Jones; March 11, 1924; Grandview, Washington, U.S.
- Died: April 13, 2016 (aged 92); Chapel Hill, North Carolina
- Education: University of Washington; Stanford University
- Known for: Psychometrics
- Awards: Fellow of the Center for Advanced Study in the Behavioral Sciences (1964–65 and 1981–82); Sells Award for Distinguished Multivariate Research from the Society of Multivariate Experimental Psychology (2004)
- Scientific career
- Fields: Psychology
- Workplaces: University of North Carolina at Chapel Hill
- Thesis: Analysis of Visual Discrimination Learning by Pigeons (1950)

Lyle Vincent Jones (March 11, 1924 – April 13, 2016) was an American psychologist known for his pioneering work in psychometrics. He was an early architect of the National Assessment of Educational Progress.

== Early life and education ==
Jones was born in Grandview, Washington on March 11, 1924. He began taking classes at Reed College in 1942. A year later, immediately after completing his freshman year, he left Reed to begin active duty in the United States Army Air Corps. He continued to serve in the Air Corps until 1946, when he attended the University of Washington to complete his bachelor's degree. He then received his master's degree, also from the University of Washington, before receiving his Ph.D. from Stanford University in 1950.

== Career ==
After receiving his Ph.D., Jones began teaching at the University of Chicago and the University of Texas before joining the faculty of the University of North Carolina at Chapel Hill (UNC-Chapel Hill) in 1957. At UNC-Chapel Hill, he worked with Louis Leon Thurstone at the Psychometric Laboratory (later renamed the L. L. Thurstone Psychometric Laboratory). Jones served as director of the Psychometric Laboratory from 1957 until he retired in 1992, except for a five-year hiatus. For ten years (1969–79), he was also vice chancellor at UNC-Chapel Hill and dean of the graduate school there. Beginning in 1992, he was a research professor at UNC-Chapel Hill.

=== Other positions ===
Jones was the managing editor of Psychometrika from 1956 to 1961, the president of the Psychometric Society from 1962 to 1963, and president of the American Psychological Association's Division 5 from 1963 to 1964.

== Death and recognition ==
Jones died on April 13, 2016, in Chapel Hill, North Carolina, at the age of 92. In his honor, UNC-Chapel Hill established the Lyle V. Jones Award, which it awards every year to a graduate student in the L. L. Thurstone Psychometric Laboratory "who epitomizes both academic excellence and community engagement within the lab."
