= Elizabeth Thorndike =

Second wife of John Proctor

Elizabeth (Thorndike) Proctor (1642 – 30 August 1672) was the second wife of John Proctor.

Elizabeth was born circa 1642-43 in Essex County, Massachusetts. She was the third child of John Thorndike and Elizabeth Stratton.

Prior to marrying Proctor, she was married first to Edmund Bassett. In December 1662, she married John Proctor in Ipswich. In 1666, they bought the former Downing farm and moved there and had seven children. Elizabeth became ill shortly after the birth of her son, Thorndike Proctor, and she died on August 30, 1672, in Salem, Massachusetts.
