= Robert L. Thorndike =

American psychometrician and educational psychologist

Robert Ladd Thorndike
- Born: September 22, 1910
- Died: September 21, 1990 (aged 79)
- Children: Robert M. Thorndike
- Parent: Edward Thorndike (father)
- Awards: E. L. Thorndike Award (1971)

Academic background
- Education: Wesleyan University; Columbia University

Robert Ladd Thorndike (September 22, 1910 – September 21, 1990) was an American psychometrician and educational psychologist who made significant contributions to the analysis of reliability, the interpretation of error, cognitive ability, and the design and analysis of comparative surveys of achievement test performance of students in various countries.

== Education and career ==
Thorndike received his B.A. (Mathematics) from Wesleyan University in 1931, and his M.A. and Ph.D. (both in Psychology) from Columbia University in 1932 and 1935, respectively. He was a professor at Teachers College, Columbia University from 1936 to 1976. He was president of the American Educational Research Association and the Psychometric Society.

Like his father, Edward Thorndike, Thorndike conducted research in both animal and human psychology. With Irving Lorge, Thorndike published a standardized test in 1954 which later became, with the collaboration of Elizabeth Hagen, the widely used Cognitive Abilities Test. He was one of the first to write about cluster analysis and test-wiseness, the ability of test takers to find the right answer based on the known character of tests rather than knowledge of the topic. He received the E. L. Thorndike Award, which was named after his father, in 1971.

== Death ==
Thorndike died of heart failure in September 1990 at the age of 79.

Educational offices
Preceded by Patrick Suppes	President of the American Educational Research Association; 1974–1975	Succeeded by Gene V. Glass
