= Truman Lee Kelley =

Truman Lee Kelley (1884 – 1961) was an American researcher who made seminal contributions to statistics and psychology.

== Life ==
He was born in Whitehall, Muskegon County, Michigan in 1884. He died in 1961.

== Career ==
He received his A.M. degree in psychology from the University of Illinois in 1911, where he became one of the four founding students of Kappa Delta Pi. He completed his Ph.D. from Columbia University in 1914 under the supervision of Edward Thorndike. After doing so, he worked as an instructor at the University of Texas and at Teachers College, and then in 1920 became a professor at Stanford University. He moved to Harvard University in 1931, and retired in 1950.

== Bibliography ==
His books include:

- Statistical Method. New York: Macmillan (1923).
- Interpretation of Educational Measurements (1927)
- Crossroads in the Mind of Man (1928)
- Scientific Method; Its Function in Research and in Education (1929)
- Tests and Measurements in the Social Sciences (coauthor, 1934)
- Essential Traits of Mental Life (1935)
- The Kelley's Statistical Tables (1938; 2nd ed., 1948)
- Fundamentals of Statistics (1947)
