= Herbert Thorndike =

English academic and clergyman

Herbert Thorndike (1598 – 11 June 1672) was an English academic and clergyman, known as an orientalist and Canon of Westminster Abbey. He was an influential theological writer during the reigns of King Charles I and, after the Restoration, King Charles II. His work would be considered important in the 19th century by key members of the Oxford Movement.

== Life ==
He was the third son of Francis Thorndike, a Lincolnshire gentleman of good family, and Alice, his wife, daughter of Edward Colman, of a family resident at Burnt Ely Hale, and at Waldingfield in Suffolk. On 18 December 1613 he entered as a pensioner at Trinity College, Cambridge, and was elected a scholar the following Easter. In January 1617 he proceeded B.A., in 1618 was elected a minor fellow, and in 1620 (on his admission to the degree of M.A.) a major fellow of the college. He was a committed scholar, also active as a college tutor, deputy public orator, and university preacher, and occasionally resided on his college living. His studies were on theology and oriental languages, and especially rabbinical literature. As a churchman, he was a moderate.

On 13 April 1636 he was installed by Bishop John Williams prebendary of Layton Ecclesia in Lincoln Cathedral, just vacated by the death of his friend George Herbert. In 1640 he resigned his stall on his preferment to the crown living of Claybrook, near Lutterworth. In October 1640 he was appointed Hebrew lecturer to his college, and in June 1642 was transferred from Claybrook to the living of Barley, Hertfordshire (also pro hac vice in the gift of the crown); while at Trinity he received, about the same time, the additional appointment of senior bursar.

In 1641 he published at the University Press his first tractate, Of the Government of Churches: a Discourse pointing at the Primitive Form, and in the following year Of Religious Assemblies, and the Publick Service of God. In September 1643, the mastership of Sidney Sussex College having fallen vacant, his friend Seth Ward who was a fellow of there, in conjunction with a majority of the other fellows, sought to carry Thorndike's election as Master; but Oliver Cromwell, who caused one of Thorndike's supporters to be arrested and taken away, managed the election of Richard Minshull. In 1644 the disfavour into which Trinity College had fallen with the parliamentary party compelled Thorndike to retire from his living of Barley, which was sequestered to Henry Prime, a parishioner; in 1647 one Peter Smith was appointed minister, on whose death (August 1657) Nathanael Ball succeeded. At nearly the same time a large number of the fellows of Trinity were ejected, and Thorndike deemed it prudent to withdraw from Cambridge. Until 1652 he had practical troubles, but was assisted by his college and by the liberality of John Scudamore, 1st Viscount Scudamore, whose religious views were close to his own. His elder brother Francis, who had succeeded to the paternal estate in 1644, probably gave him substantial aid. His Right of the Church in a Christian State (1649) was printed in London, and a new enlarged edition of his two tractates was printed by the University Press, connected with the prescribed use of the Directory of Public Worship.

Thorndike took an active part in the editing of Brian Walton's Polyglott, the Syriac portion of which was his special contribution, and he carried on a correspondence with James Ussher, Walton, and Edward Pocock. From 1657 he collected materials for a new edition of Origen, a project which was not carried out in his lifetime (an edition appeared in Oxford in 1685). He worked on his major work (in Latin), the Epilogue, and the advocacy of its theory that the Protestant Reformation, as a durable settlement, was practicable only on the basis of a return to the discipline and teaching of the primitive catholic church. He did not include either the church of Rome or the Protestant churches abroad in his plan of reunion, his aim being chiefly to define the ground on which, as he held, the church of England could alone make good her own position. Clarendon and Isaac Barrow criticised certain portions of the Epilogue severely.

With the Restoration, Thorndike was reinstated in his fellowship at Trinity and in his living of Barley (resigned in 1661). In July 1660 he published his Due Way of composing Differences, and on 20 March 1661 was appointed to assist at the Savoy Conference, where he took a minor part but suffered a barb from Richard Baxter. About the same time he was appointed a member of convocation, and in that capacity took a leading share in the revision of the prayerbook, then in progress; while in his tract entitled Just Weights and Measures (January 1662), designed to illustrate the practical application of the theory set forth in the Epilogue, he especially advocated as measures of church reform, the prevention of pluralities and the restoration of the discipline of penance.

He fell ill, and moved back at the end of 1662 to Cambridge; he was absent during the plague of 1666. In June 1667 he again returned to Trinity, but his acceptance a few weeks later of the tithes of Trumpington parish involved the surrender of his fellowship, and he accordingly retired to his canonry at Westminster, where he took up residence in the cloisters. In 1668 his brother John Thorndike returned from his life of exile in New England, where he had helped to found Ipswich, Massachusetts, but only to die in the November of the same year. He was accompanied by his two daughters, Alice and Martha, who came to live with Herbert.

The year 1670 saw the appearance of his Discourse of the Forbearance or Penalties which a due Reformation requires, and also of the first part of his De Ratione ac Jure finiendi Controversias Ecclesiae Disputatio, the restating the argument of the Epilogue and other works. In the spring of 1672 he was again ill, and he went to a place rented by the chapter at Chiswick. He died there on 11 July 1672, at the age of seventy-four, and was interred in the east cloister of Westminster Abbey. His will gave the bulk of his property to church purposes, after making some provision for his two nieces and for his grandniece, Anne Alington.

== Works ==
Thorndike's position as a theologian was unusual and some of his views were challenged from his own side of the debates, in particular by Isaac Barrow in his posthumous tract on The Unity of the Church, and by Henry More in his Antidote to Idolatry. He countenanced the practice of prayers for the dead; and by Cardinal Newman he was regarded as the only writer of any authority in the English church who held the true theory of the Eucharist.

Writings published during his lifetime were:

- 'Epitome Lexici Hebraici, Syriaci, Rabinici, et Arabici . . . cum Observationibus circa Linguam Hebream et Grecam,' &c., London, 1635.
- 'Of the Government of Churches,' Cambridge, 1641.
- 'Of Religious Assemblies and the Publick Service of God,' London, 1642 (printed by the university printer, Daniel, at Cambridge).
- 'A Discourse of the Right of the Church in a Christian State,' London, 1649, and by a different printer, London, 1670; also re-edited, with preface, by J. S. Brewer. London, 1841.
- 'A Letter concerning the Present State of Religion amongst us,' (without name or date), in 1656; with author's name, along with 'Just Weights and Measures,' London, 1662 and 1680.
- 'Variances in Syriaca Versione Veteris Testamenti Lectiones,' London, 1657.
- 'An Epilogue to the Tragedy of the Church of England,' London, 1659.
- 'The Due Way of composing the Differences on Foot,' London, 1660 (reprinted with 'Just Weights,' &c., 1662 and 1680).
- 'Just Weights and Measures,' &c., London, 1662.
- 'A Discourse of the Forbearance or the Penalties which a Due Reformation requires,' London, 1670.
- 'De Ratione ac Jure finiendi Controversias Ecclesiae Disputatio,' London, 1670.

Thorndike's collected works were published in the Library of Anglo-Catholic Theology, in six volumes (1844–56), of which the last four were edited by Arthur West Haddan, the first two by another hand. These volumes included, besides the works published in Thorndike's lifetime, the following pieces left by him in manuscript*

- 'The True Principle of Comprehension.'
- 'The Plea of Weakness and Tender Consciences discussed.'
- 'The Reformation of the Church of England better than that of the Council of Trent.'
- 'Mr. Herbert Thorndike's Judgment of the Church of Rome.'
- 'The Church's Right to Tithes, as found in Scripture.'
- 'The Church's Power of Excommunication, as found in Scripture.'
- 'The Church's Legislative Power, as found in Scripture.'
- 'The Right of the Christian State in Church-matters, according to the Scriptures.'
