= Guillermo Thorndike =

Peruvian journalist and writer

Guillermo Thorndike Losada (April 25, 1940 – March 9, 2009) was a Peruvian journalist and writer, who helped to found several important newspapers within Peru. Thorndike helped to found La República, one of the country's main national dailies, and was the founder of Cronicawan, the first nationally circulated Quechua language newspaper in Peru's history. He has been called one of the most important Peruvian journalists of the past 40 years.

== Early life ==
Thorndike was born on April 25, 1940, in Lima, Peru.

== Career ==
Thorndike became the founding editor of La República in 1981. Since its founding La República has remained one of Peru's main national daily newspapers.

He also served as the editor of at least two other Peruvian newspapers, La Cronica and La Tercera. Additionally, Thorndike founded Cronicawan, Peru's first nationally circulated Quechua language newspaper.

Thorndike's writings dealt primarily with the societal and political problems affecting Peru. His most well known works included "El Año de la Barbarie en Lima" (The Year of Barbarism in Lima), "El Caso Banchero" (The Banchero Case) and "La Revolucion Imposible" (The Impossible Revolution).

Thorndike's last position was as news director of RBC Televisión, a Peruvian station. He remained news director at the station until a few months before his death.

== Death ==
Guillermo Thorndike died of a heart attack on March 9, 2009, in Lima, Peru, at the age of 69. His was cremated and buried at his family's mausoleum in Lima's Presbitero Maestro Cemetery.
