= Ashley Horace Thorndike =

19th/20th-century American educator and Shakespeare expert

Ashley Horace Thorndike (December 26, 1871 – April 17, 1933) was an American educator and expert on William Shakespeare.

== Early life ==
Thorndike was born in Houlton, Maine on December 26, 1871. He was the son of a clergyman Edward R Thorndike, and the brother of Lynn Thorndike, an American historian of medieval science and alchemy, and Edward Lee Thorndike, known for being the father of modern educational psychology.

He graduated from Wesleyan University in 1893 followed by a masters degree from Harvard University in 1896 and a PhD in 1898.

== Career ==
Before coming to Columbia University, he was a principal at Smith Academy in Hatfield, Massachusetts, and was an instructor at Boston University, Western Reserve University, and Northwestern University, where he was a professor of English from 1902 to 1906. At Columbia, he taught and wrote several notable textbooks, including Facts about Shakespeare (as coauthor), Tragedy, and English Comedy. He died of a heart attack in Manhattan as he was walking home from a club dinner. At his death he was serving as president of the original Shakespeare Association of America. He was the brother of the medieval historian Lynn Thorndike who also taught at Columbia. He introduced the term "revenge tragedy" in 1900 to label a class of plays written in the late Elizabethan and early Jacobean eras.

In 1927 he delivered the British Academy's Shakespeare Lecture.

== Personal life ==
In 1899, Thorndike married Annette Marian Lowell of Hatfield, Massachusetts. They lived at 4643 Waldo Avenue in Riverdale, Bronx, where he had the New York architectural firm of Davis, McGrath & Kiessling design his home.

After collapsing at Madison Avenue and 41st Street while on his way home from a dinner in the Fraternity Clubs Building two blocks away, he died in a cab en route to Bellevue Hospital on April 17, 1933. His widow lived until 1959.

== Selected publications ==
Books

- The Influence of Beaumont and Fletcher on Shakespere (1901)
- The Elements of Shakespeare and Composition (1905)
- Tragedy (1908)
- with William Allan Neilson: The Facts about Shakespeare (1913); 1923 reprint
- Shakespeare's Theatre (1916)
- Literature in a Changing World (1920)
- English Comedy (1929); 1965 edition

Articles

- "The Relations of Hamlet to Contemporary Revenge Plays," PMLA, Vol. 17, No. 2 (1902), pp. 125-220. <https://doi.org/10.2307/456606>
- "Shakespeare in America," The Shakespeare Association Bulletin, Vol. 3, No. 2 (July, 1928), pp. 1-8. <https://www.jstor.org/stable/23675742>
