= Frank N. Freeman =

Canadian-American psychologist

- Born: Frank Nugent Freeman; April 17, 1880; Rockwood, Ontario, Canada
- Died: October 17, 1961 (aged 81); El Cerrito, California, United States
- Education: Wesleyan University; Yale University
- Known for: Work on psychological testing
- Spouses: Bertha Longley Wright (m. 1908–1937) Flora M. Dunn (m. 1937–1961)
- Children: Five
- Scientific career
- Fields: Educational psychology
- Institutions: University of Chicago; University of California, Berkeley
- Thesis: Experiments in Writing (1908)
- Doctoral advisor: Charles Hubbard Judd

Frank Nugent Freeman (April 17, 1880 – October 17, 1961) was a Canadian-born American educational psychologist. He taught at the University of Chicago from 1909 to 1939, and served as dean of the University of California, Berkeley's Graduate School of Education from then until 1948. Among his most notable books are Mental Tests: Their History, Principles and Applications (1926) and Twins: A Study of Heredity and Environment (1937).
