= Irving Lorge =

American psychologist

- Born: April 19, 1905; New York City, US
- Died: January 23, 1961 (aged 55); New York City, US
- Education: City College of New York; Teachers College, Columbia University
- Spouse: Sarah Wolfson (m. 1936)
- Children: 2
- Scientific career
- Fields: Psychometrics
- Institutions: Teachers College, Columbia University
- Thesis: Influence of regularly interpolated time intervals upon subsequent learning (1930)
- Academic advisors: Edward L. Thorndike

Irving Daniel Lorge (April 19, 1905 – January 23, 1961) was an American psychologist known for his work in psychometrics. His research focused on a wide variety of topics, including the measurement of giftedness, human intelligence, and readability. While working at Columbia University's Teachers College with his mentor Edward L. Thorndike, he helped develop what became known as the Lorge-Thorndike Intelligence Tests.

== Biography ==
Lorge was born on April 19, 1905, in New York City. He joined the faculty at Teachers College, Columbia University in 1927 to work with Edward L. Thorndike. In 1938, he became Associate Professor of Education at Teachers College, and he continued to work there for the rest of his life, save for two years working as a consultant to the United States federal government during World War II. Specifically, from 1942 to 1944, he was a consultant to the special training division of the United States Army, where he significantly changed the way in which the Army trained illiterate soldiers. He was promoted to Professor of Education at Teachers College in 1946, and became executive officer in the Institute of Psychological Research there in 1947; he held both of these positions until his death. He was a founder of the Psychometric Society, and later served as its president. He died unexpectedly on January 23, 1961, of a heart attack.
