= Lynn Thorndike =

American historian (1882–1965)

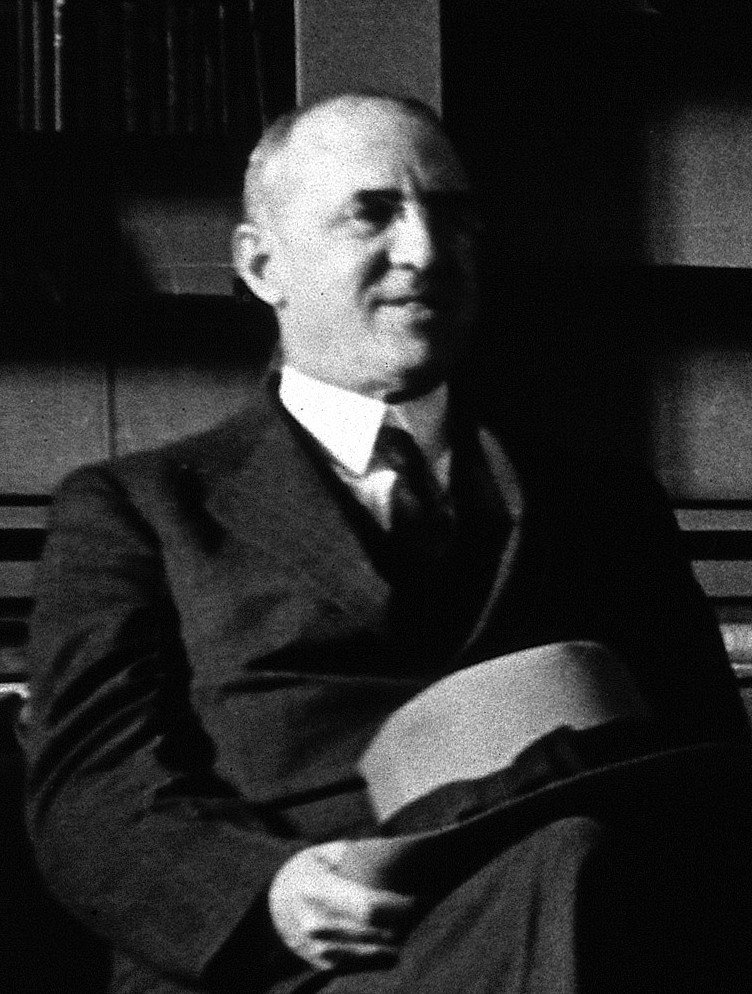
Thorndike in 1938

Lynn Thorndike (July 24, 1882 – December 28, 1965) was an American historian of medieval science and alchemy. He was the son of a clergyman, Edward R. Thorndike, and the younger brother of Ashley Horace Thorndike, an American educator and expert on William Shakespeare, and Edward Lee Thorndike, known for being the father of modern educational psychology.

In A Short History of Civilization (1926), Thorndike was the first historian to propose the term "early modern" to describe what is today recognized as the early modern period, about 1500–1800.

== Early life and education ==
Thorndike was born in Lynn, Massachusetts, on July 24, 1882. He attended Wesleyan University in Middletown, Connecticut, where he graduated with a Bachelor of Arts in 1902, and then medieval history a Master of Arts in medieval history from Columbia University in 1903 and doctorate in 1903. Thorndike's doctoral dissertation (1905) was about "The Place of Magic in the Intellectual History of Europe", which he went on to link with the historical development of experimental science.

== Career ==
He began teaching medieval history at Northwestern University in 1907. He moved to Western Reserve University in 1909 and stayed there until 1924. Columbia University lured him away in fall 1924 and he taught there until he retired from teaching in 1950.

=== Writing career ===
After retiring from teaching, Thorndike continued to publish for an additional ten years and in 1957 received the Sarton Medal from the History of Science Society. He served as the president there in 1929 and also served as president of the American Historical Association. He was elected to the American Philosophical Society in 1939.

Counter to Swiss historian Jacob Burckhardt who argued that the Italian Renaissance was a separate phase, Thorndike believed that most of the political, social, moral and religious phenomena which are commonly defined as Renaissance seemed to be almost equally characteristic of Italy at any time from the twelfth to the eighteenth centuries.

Among his books on magic and science is A History of Magic and Experimental Science (8 vol., 1923–1958), spanning the period from early Christianity through early modern Europe to the end of the 17th century. In that book, he commented about the best way to find historical truth:

Some investigators of manuscripts, like certain anthropologists and archeologists, seem to think that they attain a higher degree of scholarship, if they propound some novel and improbable theory and adduce a certain amount of evidence for it. This is hardly the direct or rapid method of attaining historical truth.

Another book by Thorndike about magic and science is Science and Thought in the Fifteenth Century (1929). Thorndike also wrote The History of Medieval Europe (1917, 3d ed. 1949) and translated the medieval astronomical textbook De sphaera mundi of Johannes de Sacrobosco.

== Works ==
- The Place of Magic in the Intellectual History of Europe, The Columbia University Press, 1905.
- The True Roger Bacon, 1916.
- The History of Medieval Europe, Houghton Mifflin Company, 1917.
- Medieval Europe, its Development & Civilization, George G. Harrap & Company Ltd., 1920.
- Galen: the man and his times, 1922.
- Peter of Abano: A Medieval Scientist, 1923.
- History of Magic and Experimental Science, 1923–1958, in 8 volumes (e.g. Volume I & Volume II).
- A Short History of Civilization, 1926.
- Outline of Medieval and Modern History, 1929.
- Check-list of Rotographs in the History of Natural and Occult Science, 1934.
- University Records and Life in the Middle Ages, New York: Columbia University Press, 1944.
- Dates in Intellectual History: the Fourteenth Century, 1945.
- Traditional Medieval Tracts Concerning Engraved Astrological Images, 1947.
- The Sphere of Sacrobosco and its Commentators, University of Chicago Press, 1949.
- Latin Treatises on Comets Between 1238 and 1368 A. D., University of Chicago Press, 1950.
- The Sixteenth Century, Columbia University Press, 1959.
- Science and Thought in the Fifteenth Century; Studies in the History of Medicine and Surgery, Natural and Mathematical Science, Philosophy, and Politics, 1963
- Michael Scot, Nelson, 1965.

=== Miscellany ===
- "Measuring Euripides", Issued by The College for Women Section, Chapter Alpha of Ohio, Phi Beta Kappa, 1916.
- "Whatever Was, Was Right", Presidential Address Read at the Annual Dinner of the American Historical Association, Mayflower Hotel, Washington, D. C., December 29, 1955
