= Edward Thorndike =

American psychologist (1874–1949)

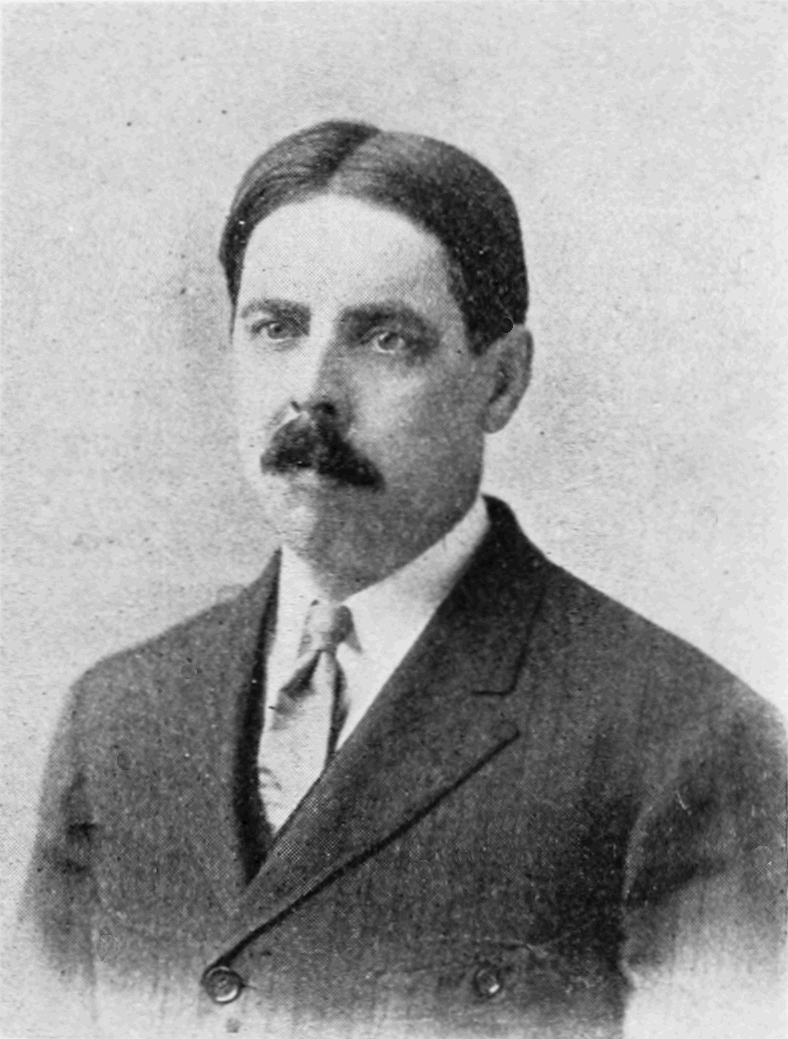
- Thorndike in 1912
- Born: Edward Lee Thorndike; August 31, 1874; Williamsburg, Massachusetts, U.S.
- Died: August 9, 1949 (aged 74); Montrose, New York, U.S.
- Occupation: Psychologist
- Known for: Father of educational psychology Law of effect Behavior modification
- Spouse: Elizabeth Moulton (m. 1900)
- Children: 5, including Frances

Academic background
- Education: Wesleyan University (BS); Harvard University (MA); Columbia University (PhD)
- Doctoral advisor: James McKeen Cattell
- Other advisor: William James

Academic work
- Institutions: Columbia University
- Doctoral students: Walter V. Bingham; William S. Gray; Laurance F. Shaffer; Truman Lee Kelley; Percival Symonds; Leta Stetter Hollingworth; Irving Lorge; Tsuruko Haraguchi

Edward Lee Thorndike (August 31, 1874 – August 9, 1949) was an American psychologist who spent nearly his entire career at Teachers College, Columbia University. His work on comparative psychology and the learning process led to his "theory of connectionism" and helped lay the scientific foundation for educational psychology. He also worked on solving industrial problems, such as employee exams and testing.

Thorndike was a member of the board of the Psychological Corporation and served as president of the American Psychological Association in 1912. A Review of General Psychology survey, published in 2002, ranked Thorndike as the ninth-most cited psychologist of the 20th century. Edward Thorndike had a powerful impact on reinforcement theory and behavior analysis, providing the basic framework for empirical laws in behavior psychology with his law of effect. Through his contributions to the behavioral psychology field came his major impacts on education, where the law of effect has great influence in the classroom.

== Early life and education ==
Thorndike, born in Williamsburg, Massachusetts was the son of Edward R and Abbie B Thorndike, a Methodist minister in Lowell, Massachusetts. Thorndike graduated from The Roxbury Latin School (1891), in West Roxbury, Massachusetts and from Wesleyan University (B.S. 1895). He earned an M.A. at Harvard University in 1897. His two brothers (Lynn and Ashley) also became important scholars. The younger, Lynn, was a medievalist specializing in the history of science and magic, while the older, Ashley, was an English professor and noted authority on Shakespeare.

While at Harvard, he was interested in how animals learn (ethology), and worked with William James. Afterwards, he became interested in the animal 'man', to the study of which he then devoted his life. Edward's thesis is sometimes thought of as the essential document of modern comparative psychology. Upon graduation, Thorndike returned to his initial interest, educational psychology. In 1898 he completed his PhD at Columbia University under the supervision of James McKeen Cattell, one of the founding fathers of psychometrics.

In 1899, after a year of unhappy initial employment at the College for Women of Case Western Reserve in Cleveland, Ohio, he became an instructor in psychology at Teachers College at Columbia University, where he remained for the rest of his career, studying human learning, education, and mental testing. In 1937 Thorndike became the second President of the Psychometric Society, following in the footsteps of Louis Leon Thurstone who had established the society and its journal Psychometrika the previous year.

On August 29, 1900, he wed Elizabeth Moulton. They had five children, among them Frances, who became a mathematician.

During the early stages of his career, he purchased a wide tract of land on the Hudson and encouraged other researchers to settle around him. Soon a colony had formed there with him as its 'tribal' chief.

== Connectionism ==
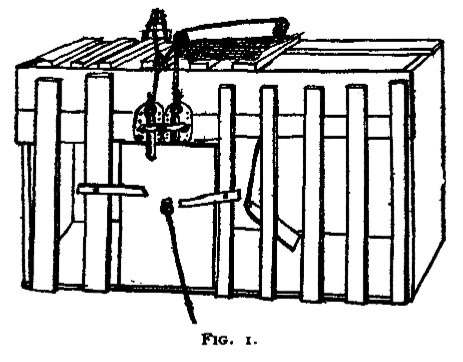
Thorndike's original apparatus used in his puzzle-box experiments as seen in Animal Intelligence (Jun 1898)

Thorndike was a pioneer not only in behaviorism and in studying learning, but also in using animals in clinical experiments. Thorndike was able to create a theory of learning based on his research with animals. His doctoral dissertation, "Animal Intelligence: An Experimental Study of the Associative Processes in Animals", was the first in psychology where the subjects were nonhumans. Thorndike was interested in whether animals could learn tasks through imitation or observation. To test this, Thorndike created puzzle boxes. The puzzle boxes were approximately 20 inches long, 15 inches wide, and 12 inches tall. Each box had a door that was pulled open by a weight attached to a string that ran over a pulley and was attached to the door. The string attached to the door led to a lever or button inside the box. When the animal pressed the bar or pulled the lever, the string attached to the door would cause the weight to lift and the door to open. Thorndike's puzzle boxes were arranged so that the animal would be required to perform a certain response (pulling a lever or pushing a button), while he measured the amount of time it took them to escape. Once the animal had performed the desired response they were allowed to escape and were also given a reward, usually food. Thorndike primarily used cats in his puzzle boxes. When the cats were put into the cages they would wander restlessly and meow, but they did not know how to escape. Eventually, the cats would step on the switch on the floor by chance, and the door would open. To see if the cats could learn through observation, he had them observe other animals escaping from the box. He would then compare the times of those who got to observe others escaping with those who did not, and he found that there was no difference in their rate of learning. Thorndike saw the same results with other animals, and he observed that there was no improvement even when he placed the animals' paws on the correct levers, buttons, or bar. These failures led him to fall back on a trial and error explanation of learning. He found that after accidentally stepping on the switch once, they would press the switch faster in each succeeding trial inside the puzzle box. By observing and recording the animals' escapes and escape times, Thorndike was able to graph the times it took for the animals in each trial to escape, resulting in a learning curve. The animals had difficulty escaping at first, but eventually "caught on" and escaped faster and faster with each successive puzzle box trial, until they eventually leveled off. The quickened rate of escape results in the s-shape of the learning curve. The learning curve also suggested that different species learned in the same way but at different speeds. From his research with puzzle boxes, Thorndike was able to create his own theory of learning. The puzzle box experiments were motivated in part by Thorndike's dislike for statements that animals made use of extraordinary faculties such as insight in their problem solving: "In the first place, most of the books do not give us a psychology, but rather a eulogy of animals. They have all been about animal intelligence, never about animal stupidity."

Thorndike meant to distinguish clearly whether or not cats escaping from puzzle boxes were using insight. Thorndike's instruments in answering this question were learning curves revealed by plotting the time it took for an animal to escape the box each time it was in the box. He reasoned that if the animals were showing insight, then their time to escape would suddenly drop to a negligible period, which would also be shown in the learning curve as an abrupt drop; while animals using a more ordinary method of trial and error would show gradual curves. His finding was that cats consistently showed gradual learning.

== Adult learning ==
Thorndike put his testing expertise to work for the United States Army during World War I, participating in the development of the Army Beta test used to evaluate illiterate, unschooled, and non-English speaking recruits.

Thorndike believed that "Instruction should pursue specified, socially useful goals." Thorndike believed that the ability to learn did not decline until age 35, and only then at a rate of 1 percent per year. Thorndike also stated the law of effect, which says behaviors that are followed by good consequences are likely to be repeated in the future.

Thorndike identified the three main areas of intellectual development. The first being abstract intelligence. This is the ability to process and understand different concepts. The second is mechanical intelligence, which is the ability to handle physical objects. Lastly there is social intelligence. This is the ability to handle human interaction.

1. Learning is incremental.
2. Learning occurs automatically.
3. All animals learn the same way.
4. Law of effect—if an association is followed by a "satisfying state of affairs" it will be strengthened and if it is followed by an "annoying state of affairs " it will be weakened.
5. Thorndike's law of exercise has two parts; the law of use and the law of disuse.
  1. Law of use—the more often an association is used the stronger it becomes.
  2. Law of disuse—the longer an association is unused the weaker it becomes.
6. Law of recency—the most recent response is most likely to reoccur.
7. Multiple response—problem solving through trial and error. An animal will try multiple responses if the first response does not lead to a specific state of affairs.
8. Set or attitude—animals are predisposed to act in a specific way.
9. Prepotency of elements—a subject can filter out irrelevant aspects of a problem and focus and respond only to significant elements of a problem.
10. Response by analogy—responses from a related or similar context may be used in a new context.
11. Identical elements theory of transfer—This theory states that the extent to which information learned in one situation will transfer to another situation is determined by the similarity between the two situations. The more similar the situations are, the greater the amount of information that will transfer. Similarly, if the situations have nothing in common, information learned in one situation will not be of any value in the other situation.
12. Associative shifting—it is possible to shift any response from occurring with one stimulus to occurring with another stimulus. Associative shift maintains that a response is first made to situation A, then to AB, and then finally to B, thus shifting a response from one condition to another by associating it with that condition.
13. Law of readiness—a quality in responses and connections that results in readiness to act. Thorndike acknowledges that responses may differ in their readiness. He claims that eating has a higher degree of readiness than vomiting, that weariness detracts from the readiness to play and increases the readiness to sleep. Also, Thorndike argues that a low or negative status in respect to readiness is called unreadiness. Behavior and learning are influenced by the readiness or unreadiness of responses, as well as by their strength.
14. Identifiability—According to Thorndike, the identification or placement of a situation is a first response of the nervous system, which can recognize it. Then connections may be made to one another or to another response, and these connections depend upon the original identification. Therefore, a large amount of learning is made up of changes in the identifiability of situations. Thorndike also believed that analysis might turn situations into compounds of features, such as the number of sides on a shape, to help the mind grasp and retain the situation, and increase their identifiability.
15. Availability—The ease of getting a specific response. For example, it would be easier for a person to learn to touch their nose or mouth than it would be for them to draw a line 5 inches long with their eyes closed.

=== Development of law of effect ===
Thorndike's research focused on instrumental learning, which means that learning is developed from the organism doing something. For example, he placed a cat inside a wooden box. The cat would use various methods while trying to get out, but nothing would work until it hit the lever. Afterwards, Thorndike tried placing the cat inside the wooden box again. This time, the cat was able to hit the lever quickly and succeeded in getting out from the box.

At first, Thorndike emphasized the importance of dissatisfaction stemming from failure as equal to the reward of satisfaction with success, though in his experiments and trials on humans he came to conclude that reward is a much more effective motivator than punishment. He also emphasized that the satisfaction must come immediately after the success, or the lesson would not sink in.

== Eugenics ==
Thorndike was a proponent of eugenics. He argued that "selective breeding can alter man's capacity to learn, to keep sane, to cherish justice or to be happy. There is no more certain and economical a way to improve man's environment as to improve his nature." He stated:

I hope to have made it clear that we have much to learn about eugenics, and also that we already know enough to justify us in providing for the original intellect and character of man in the future with a higher, purer source than the muddy streams of the past. If it is our duty to improve the face of the world and human customs and traditions, so that men unborn may live in better conditions, it is doubly our duty to improve the original natures of these men themselves. For there is no surer means of improving the conditions of life.

And furthermore:

It is no part of my office to moralize on these facts. But surely it would be a pitiable thing if man should forever make inferior men as a by-product of passion, and deny good men life in mistaken devotion to palliative and remedial philanthropy. Ethics and religion must teach man to want the welfare of the future as well as the relief of the cripple before his eyes; and science must teach man to control his own future nature as well as the animals, plants, and physical forces amongst which he will have to live. It is a noble thing that human reason, bred of a myriad unreasoned happenings, and driven forth into life by whips made aeons ago with no thought of man's higher wants, can yet turn back to understand man's birth, survey his journey, chart and steer his future course, and free him from barriers without and defects within. Until the last removable impediment in man's own nature dies childless, human reason will not rest.

== Thorndike on education ==
Thorndike's Educational psychology began a trend toward behavioral psychology that sought to use empirical evidence and a scientific approach to problem solving. Thorndike was among some of the first psychologists to combine learning theory, psychometrics, and applied research for school-related subjects to form psychology of education. One of his influences on education is seen by his ideas on mass marketing of tests and textbooks at that time. Thorndike opposed the idea that learning should reflect nature, which was the main thought of developmental scientists at that time. He instead thought that schooling should improve upon nature. Unlike many other psychologist of his time, Thorndike took a statistical approach to education in his later years by collecting qualitative information intended to help teachers and educators deal with practical educational problems. Thorndike's theory was an association theory, as many were in that time. He believed that the association between stimulus and response was solidified by a reward or confirmation. He also thought that motivation was an important factor in learning. The Law of Effect introduced the relation between reinforcers and punishers. Although Thorndike's description of the relation between reinforcers and punishers was incomplete, his work in this area would later become a catalyst in further research, such as that of B.F. Skinner.

Thorndike's Law of Effect states that "responses that produce a desired effect are more likely to occur again whereas responses that produce an unpleasant effect are less likely to occur again". The terms 'desired effect' and 'unpleasant effect' eventually became known as 'reinforcers' and 'punishers'. Thorndike's contributions to the Behavioral Psychology Society are seen through his influences in the classroom, with a particular focus on praising and ignoring behaviors. Praise is used in the classroom to encourage and support the occurrence of a desired behavior. When used in the classroom, praise has been shown to increase correct responses and appropriate behavior. Planned ignoring is used to decrease, weaken, or eliminate the occurrence of a target behavior. Planned ignoring is accomplished by removing the reinforcer that is maintaining the behavior. For example, when the teacher does not pay attention to a "whining" behavior of a student, it allows the student to realize that whining will not succeed in gaining the attention of the teacher.

== Beliefs about the behavior of women ==
Unlike later behaviorists such as John B. Watson, who placed a very strong emphasis on the impact of environmental influences on behavior, Thorndike believed that differences in the parental behavior of men and women were due to biological, rather than cultural, reasons. While conceding that society could "complicate or deform" what he believed were inborn differences, he believed that "if we [researchers] should keep the environment of boys and girls absolutely similar these instincts would produce sure and important differences between the mental and moral activities of boys and girls". Indeed, Watson himself overtly critiqued the idea of maternal instincts in humans in a report of his observations of first-time mothers struggling to breastfeed. Watson argued that the very behaviors Thorndike referred to as resulting from a "nursing instinct" stemming from "unreasoning tendencies to pet, coddle, and 'do for' others," were performed with difficulty by new mothers and thus must have been learned, while "instinctive factors are practically nil".

Thorndike's beliefs about inborn differences between the thoughts and behavior of men and women included arguments about the role of women in society. For example, along with the "nursing instinct," Thorndike talked about the instinct of "submission to mastery," arguing that because men are typically physically larger than women, "Women in general are thus by original nature submissive to men in general." Such beliefs were commonplace during this era.

== Thorndike's word books ==
Thorndike composed three different word books to assist teachers with word and reading instruction. After publication of The Teacher's Word Book in 1921, two other books were written and published, each approximately a decade apart from its predecessor. The second book in the series, its full title being A Teacher's Word Book of the Twenty Thousand Words Found Most Frequently and Widely in General Reading for Children and Young People, was published in 1932, and the third and final book, The Teacher's Word Book of 30,000 Words, was published in 1944.

In Appendix A to the second book, Thorndike gives credit to his word counts and how frequencies were assigned to particular words. Selected sources extrapolated from Appendix A include:

- Children's Reading: Black Beauty, Little Women, Treasure Island, A Christmas Carol, The Legend of Sleepy Hollow, Youth's Companion, school primers, first readers, second readers, and third readers
- Standard Literature: The Bible, Shakespeare, Tennyson, Wordsworth, Cowper, Pope, and Milton
- Common Facts and Trades: The United States Constitution and the Declaration of Independence, A New Book of Cookery, Practical Sewing and Dress Making, Garden and Farm Almanac, and mail-order catalogues

In the preface to the third book, Thorndike writes that the list contained therein "tells anyone who wishes to know whether to use a word in writing, speaking, or teaching how common the word is in standard English reading matter" (p. x), and he further advises that the list can best be employed by teachers if they allow it to guide the decisions they make choosing which words to emphasize during reading instruction. Some words require more emphasis than others, and, according to Thorndike, his list informs teachers of the most frequently occurring words that should be reinforced by instruction and thus become "a permanent part of [students'] stock of word knowledge" (p. xi). If a word is not on the list but appears in an educational text, its meaning only needs to be understood temporarily in the context in which it was found, and then summarily discarded from memory.

== Thorndike's influence ==
Thorndike contributed a great deal to psychology. His influence on animal psychologists, especially those who focused on behavior plasticity, greatly contributed to the future of that field. In addition to helping pave the way towards behaviorism, his contribution to measurement influenced philosophy, the administration and practice of education, military administration, industrial personnel administration, civil service and many public and private social services. Thorndike influenced many schools of psychology as Gestalt psychologists, psychologists studying the conditioned reflex, and behavioral psychologists all studied Thorndike's research as a starting point. Thorndike was a contemporary of John B. Watson and Ivan Pavlov. However, unlike Watson, Thorndike introduced the concept of reinforcement. Thorndike was the first to apply psychological principles to the area of learning. His research led to many theories and laws of learning. His theory of learning, especially the law of effect, is most often considered to be his greatest achievement. In 1929, Thorndike addressed his early theory of learning, and claimed that he had been wrong. After further research, he was forced to denounce his law of exercise completely, because he found that practice alone did not strengthen an association, and that time alone did not weaken an association. He also got rid of half of the law of effect, after finding that a satisfying state of affairs strengthens an association, but punishment is not effective in modifying behavior. He placed a great emphasis on consequences of behavior as setting the foundation for what is and is not learned. His work represents the transition from the school of functionalism to behaviorism, and enabled psychology to focus on learning theory. Thorndike's work would eventually be a major influence to B.F. Skinner and Clark Hull. Skinner, like Thorndike, put animals in boxes and observed them to see what they were able to learn. The learning theories of Thorndike and Pavlov were later synthesized by Clark Hull. His work on motivation and attitude formation directly affected studies on human nature as well as social order. Thorndike's research drove comparative psychology for fifty years, and influenced countless psychologists over that period of time, and even still today.

== Accomplishments ==
In 1912, Thorndike was elected president for the American Psychological Association. In 1917 he was elected as a Fellow of the American Statistical Association. He was admitted to the National Academy of Sciences in 1917. He was one of the first psychologists to be admitted to the association. Thorndike is well known for his experiments on animals supporting the law of effect. He was elected to the American Philosophical Society in 1932 and the American Academy of Arts and Sciences in 1934. That same year, Thorndike was elected president of the American Association for the Advancement of Science.

== Criticism ==
Thorndike's connectionism has been criticized for being too simplistic and reductionistic. His law of effect and puzzle box methodology were subjected to detailed criticism by behaviorists and many other psychologists. The criticisms over the law of effect mostly cover four aspects of the theory: the implied or retroactive working of the effect, the philosophical implication of the law, the identification of the effective conditions that cause learning, and the comprehensive usefulness of the law.

Because of his "racist, sexist, and antisemitic ideals", amid the George Floyd protests of 2020, the Board of Trustees of Teachers' College in New York voted unanimously to remove his name from Thorndike Hall.

== Selected works ==
- Thorndike, Edward Lee (June 1898). Cattell, James McKeen Cattell; Baldwin, James Mark (eds.). "Animal Intelligence: An Experimental Study of the Associative Processes in Animals". The Psychological Review. Series of Monograph Supplements. 2 (4). New York: Macmillan. "Thorndike's original doctoral dissertation"
- — (1900). The Human Nature Club: An Introduction to the Study of Mental Life. Chautauqua Literary and Scientific Circle. Chautauqua Institution Chautauqua Press.
- — (1903). Educational psychology.
- — (1904). Introduction to the Theory of Mental and Social Measurements. Library of psychology and scientific methods. Science Press. hdl:2027/mdp.39015026251812.
- — (1905). The Elements of Psychology. A. G. Seiler.
- — (1911a). Animal Intelligence: Experimental studies. New York: Macmillan.
- — (1911b). Individuality. Boston: Houghton Mifflin.
- — (1913a). "Eugenics: With Special Reference to Intellect and Character". Popular Science Monthly. 83. (PDF)
- — (1913b). Educational psychology, Vol 1: The original nature of man. Teachers College Press. doi:10.1037/13763-000.
- — (1913c). Educational psychology, Vol 2: The psychology of learning. Teachers College Press. doi:10.1037/13051-000.
- — (1914a). Educational psychology, Vol 3: Mental work and fatigue and individual differences and their causes. Teachers College Press. doi:10.1037/13796-000.
- — (1914b). "Educational psychology". Science. 57 (1476). New York: Teachers College Press: 430. doi:10.1126/science.57.1476.430. PMID 17757921.
- — (1999) [1914c]. Education Psychology: briefer course. New York: Routledge. ISBN 978-0-415-21011-9.
- — (1922a) [1914d]. Educational psychology briefer course. Teachers College Press.
- — (1927a) [1921]. The Teacher's Word Book (2nd ed.). Teachers College Press.
- — (1922b). The Psychology of Arithmetic. His the psychology of the elementary school subjects. New York: Macmillan. hdl:2027/mdp.39015014729746.
- — (1927b). The Measurement of Intelligence.
- — (1931). Human Learning. Century psychology series, R.M. Elliott, editor. The Century co. hdl:2027/mdp.39015010306069.
- — (1932a). A Teacher's Word Book of the Twenty Thousand Words Found Most Frequently and Widely in General Reading for Children and Young People. Teachers College Press.
- — (1932b). The Fundamentals of Learning. AMS Press Inc. ISBN 978-0-404-06429-7. (Reprinted 1971)
- — (1935). The Psychology of Wants, Interests, and Attitudes.
- —; Lorge, Irving (1944). The Teacher's Word Book of 30,000 Words (PDF). Teachers College Press.

=== Articles ===
- Thorndike, Edward Lee (1898b). "Some Experiments on Animal Intelligence". Science. New Series. VII (181). New York: Macmillan: 818–824. Bibcode:1898Sci.....7..818T. doi:10.1126/science.7.181.818. PMID 17769765.
- — (February 16, 1900). "Do Fishes Remember?". Science. New Series. 11 (268): 273–274. Bibcode:1900Sci....11..273T. doi:10.1126/science.11.268.273. JSTOR 1626563. PMID 17740220.
- — (1900). "Mental Fatigue". The Psychological Review. VII (5): 466–482. doi:10.1037/h0069440.
- Woodworth, Robert S.; — (1900). "Judgements of Magnitude by Comparison with a Mental Standard". The Psychological Review. 7 (4): 344–355. doi:10.1037/h0064288.
- Woodworth, Robert S.; — (1901). "The influence of improvement in one mental function upon the efficiency of other functions" (PDF). The Psychological Review. 8 (3): 247–261. doi:10.1037/h0074898. "here" (PDF).
- —; Woodworth, Robert S. (1901). "The Influence of Improvement on One Mental Function on the Efficiency of Other Functions: II The Estimation of Magnitudes" (PDF). The Psychological Review. 8 (4): 384–395. doi:10.1037/h0071280.
- —; Woodworth, Robert S. (1901). "The Influence of Improvement on One Mental Function on the Efficiency of Other Functions: III Functions Involving Attention, Observation, and Discrimination" (PDF). The Psychological Review. 8 (6): 553–564. doi:10.1037/h0071363.
- — (August 9, 1901). "Adaptation in Vision". Science. New Series. 14 (345): 221–222. doi:10.1126/science.14.345.221.a. JSTOR 1628095. PMID 17797830.
- — (February 1902). "Psychology in Secondary Schools". The School Review. 10 (2): 114–123. doi:10.1086/434307. JSTOR 1075880.
- — (May 1903). "The Careers of Scholarly Men in America". The Century Magazine.
- — (September 28, 1905). "Measurement of Twins". The Journal of Philosophy, Psychology and Scientific Methods. 2 (20): 547–553. doi:10.2307/2011451. JSTOR 2011451.
- — (June 1, 1906). "An Empirical Study of College Entrance Examinations". Science. New Series. 23 (596): 839–845. Bibcode:1906Sci....23..839T. doi:10.1126/science.23.596.839. JSTOR 1632842. PMID 17797564.
- — (1906). "Sex in Education". The Bookman. XXIII. New York.
- — (October 1906). "Education". The Bookman. New York.
- — (January 17, 1907). "The Mental Antecedents of Voluntary Movements". The Journal of Philosophy, Psychology and Scientific Methods. 4 (2): 40–42. doi:10.2307/2010699. JSTOR 2010699.
- — (June 6, 1907). "On the Function of Visual Images". The Journal of Philosophy, Psychology and Scientific Methods. 4 (12): 324–327. doi:10.2307/2010743. JSTOR 2010743.
- — (July 1908). "The Effect of Practice in the Case of a Purely Intellectual Function". The American Journal of Psychology. 19 (3): 374–384. doi:10.2307/1413197. JSTOR 1413197.
- — (April 29, 1909). "A Note on the Specialization of Mental Functions with Varying Content". The Journal of Philosophy, Psychology and Scientific Methods. 6 (9): 239–240. doi:10.2307/2011832. JSTOR 2011832.
- — (March 18, 1910). "Collegiate Instruction". Science. New Series. 31 (794): 428–431. Bibcode:1910Sci....31..428T. doi:10.1126/science.31.794.428. JSTOR 1636145. PMID 17732803.
- — (May 1910). "Repeaters in the Upper Grammar Grades". The Elementary School Teacher. 10 (9): 409–414. doi:10.1086/453978. JSTOR 993291.
- — (July 1910). "Practice in the Case of Addition". The American Journal of Psychology. 21 (3): 483–486. doi:10.2307/1413352. JSTOR 1413352.
- — (July 1910). "The Relation between Memory for Words and Memory for Numbers, and the Relation between Memory over Short and Memory over Long Intervals". The American Journal of Psychology. 21 (3): 487–488. doi:10.2307/1413353. JSTOR 1413353.
- — (1910). "The Contribution of Psychology to Education". Journal of Educational Psychology. 1: 5–12. doi:10.1037/h0070113.
- — (June 1911). "Testing the Results of the Teaching of Science". The Mathematics Teacher. 3 (4): 213–218. doi:10.5951/MT.3.4.0213. JSTOR 27949682.
- — (June 16, 1911). "A Scale for Measuring the Merit of English Writing". Science. New Series. 33 (859): 935–938. doi:10.1126/science.33.859.935.b. JSTOR 1638715. PMID 17754446.
- — (May 1912). "The Measurement of Educational Products". The School Review. 20 (5): 289–299. doi:10.1086/435934. JSTOR 1076195.
- — (January 24, 1913). "Educational Diagnosis". Science. New Series. 37 (943): 133–142. Bibcode:1913Sci....37..133T. doi:10.1126/science.37.943.133. JSTOR 1637975. PMID 17794518.
- — (November 1913). "Notes on the Significance and Use of the Hillegas Scale for Measuring the Quality of English Composition". The English Journal. 2 (9): 551–561. doi:10.2307/801022. JSTOR 801022.
- — (March 1914). "An Experiment in Grading Problems in Algebra". The Mathematics Teacher. 6 (3): 123–134. doi:10.5951/MT.6.3.0123. JSTOR 27946819.
- — (November 20, 1914). "The Failure of Equalizing Opportunity to Reduce Individual Differences". Science. New Series. 40 (1038): 753–755. doi:10.1126/science.40.1038.753.b. JSTOR 1639020. PMID 17814176.
- — (April 1915). "The Form of the Curve of Practice in the Case of Addition". The American Journal of Psychology. 26 (2): 247–250. doi:10.2307/1413254. JSTOR 1413254.
- — (June 1915). "The Resemblance of Young Twins in Handwriting". The American Naturalist. 49 (582): 377–379. Bibcode:1915ANat...49..377T. doi:10.1086/279488. JSTOR 2456110.
- — (October 1916). "Notes on Practice, Improvability, and the Curve of Work". The American Journal of Psychology. 27 (4): 550–565. doi:10.2307/1412994. JSTOR 1412994.
- — (July 5, 1917). "On the Function of Visual Imagery and its Measurement from Individual Reports". The Journal of Philosophy, Psychology and Scientific Methods. 14 (14): 381–384. doi:10.2307/2940196. JSTOR 2940196.
- — (October 1917). "The Understanding of Sentences: A Study of Errors in Reading". The Elementary School Journal. 18 (2): 98–114. doi:10.1086/454594. JSTOR 993655.
- — (1920). "Reliability and Significance of Tests of Intelligence". The Journal of Educational Psychology. XI (5): 284–287. doi:10.1037/h0074443.
- — (December 1921). "A Note on the Failure of Educated Persons to Understand Simple Geometrical Facts". The Mathematics Teacher. 14 (8): 451–453. doi:10.5951/MT.14.8.0451. JSTOR 27950376.
- — (January 1922). "The Nature of Algebraic Abilities (Part I)". The Mathematics Teacher. 15 (1). doi:10.5951/MT.15.2.0079. JSTOR 27950382.
  — (February 1922). "The Nature of Algebraic Abilities (Part II)". The Mathematics Teacher. 15 (2): 6–15. doi:10.5951/MT.15.1.0006. JSTOR 27950393.
- — (March 1922). "The Psychology of the Equation". The Mathematics Teacher. 15 (3): 127–136. doi:10.5951/MT.15.3.0127. JSTOR 27950401.
- — (April 1922). "The Psychology of Problem Solving (Part I)". The Mathematics Teacher. 15 (4): 212–227. doi:10.5951/MT.15.4.0212. JSTOR 27950415.
  — (May 1922). "The Psychology of Problem Solving (Part II)". The Mathematics Teacher. 15 (5): 253–264. doi:10.5951/MT.15.5.0253. JSTOR 27950422.
- — (October 1922). "The Strength of the Mental Connections Formed in Algebra". The Mathematics Teacher. 15 (6): 317–331. doi:10.5951/MT.15.6.0317. JSTOR 27950433.
- — (November 1922). "The Constitution of Algebraic Abilities". The Mathematics Teacher. 15 (7): 405–415. doi:10.5951/MT.15.2.0079. JSTOR 27950446.
- — (April 1, 1928). "The Teachable Age". The Survey. 60: 35–37. ISBN 978-1334687419

=== Miscellany ===
- Thorndike, Edward Lee (1899). "Instinct". Boston, Ginn & Co. "in Biological Lectures From The Marine Biological Laboratory of Woods Holl, 1899."
- — (1899). "The Associative Processes in Animals". Boston, Ginn & Co. "in Biological Lectures From The Marine Biological Laboratory of Woods Holl, 1899."

== See also ==
- Halo effect
- Benjamin D. Wood
- Robert L. Thorndike
- Transfer of learning
