= May Smith (psychologist) =

British psychologist (1879–1968)

- Born: 29 August 1879; Hulme, England
- Died: 21 February 1968 (aged 88); London, England
- Occupation: Psychologist
- Known for: Experimental research in the field of industrial psychology

May Smith OBE (29 August 1879 – 22 February 1968) was a British Industrial psychologist from Hulme, Manchester. She received a bachelor's degree in 1903 and later received a Doctor of Science degree in 1930. Throughout her career, she taught at colleges as well as performing important research in the field of industrial psychology. She subjected herself to her own trials in her research on fatigue. She worked alongside other researchers to find the effects of alcohol and opium on efficiency as well as research on telegraphist's cramp. She was an investigator at the Industrial Health Research Board from 1920 to 1944. She held several positions on the executive of the British Psychological Society.

== Early life and education ==
Born in Hulme, Manchester, on 29 August 1879, May Smith was the elder daughter of an iron turner. She attended Owens College on an education scholarship, studying philosophy and some psychology. She earned a Bachelor of Arts degree and an external diploma in education from the University of London in 1903. After graduating, she taught school in Manchester for two years. In 1905 May Smith began teaching educational psychology at Cherwell Hall, a training school for secondary school teachers in Oxford. She intended to study for a Master of Arts degree in philosophy from the University of Manchester while working full-time. However, after attending lectures by the psychologist William McDougall, she decided to become his student and research assistant. While continuing to teach at Cherwell Hall, she became part of a group of McDougall's students, including William Brown, Cyril Burt, and J. C. Flugel, who were interested in experimental psychology. London University awarded May Smith a Doctor of Science degree in 1930.

== Research ==
=== Study of fatigue ===
Having been trained in experimental methods by McDougall, Smith developed and carried out a major study on the effects of fatigue. Using herself as the sole research subject, she restricted herself to only 1.5, 3.5 and 5.5 hours of sleep on successive nights, using a variety of tests to evaluate the consequences. These included serial word recall, the capacity to learn nonsense syllables, and performance on several physical tasks. She carried on the experiment for three years, averaging five days a week. May Smith published her findings in the British Journal of Psychology in 1916. She found that there was a brief period immediately after the initial sleep deprivation in which the subject's performance was improved, but that this was followed by a long period in which performance was diminished, and that recovery was slow. She also noted that the fatigued subject's ability to judge her own effectiveness was impaired, "extremely bad work being not infrequently accompanied by a conviction that it is unusually good". She concludes that the ideal amount of time necessary to complete work most efficiently and effectively differs between every individual and type of work.

=== Effects of alcohol and opium on efficiency ===
Among other research projects, Smith worked with McDougall on studying the effects of alcohol and opium on efficiency. This experience led to her being hired to interview incarcerated prostitutes to determine whether or not "drink had contributed largely to their choice of occupation", a hypothesis that was not supported by her findings.

=== Telegraphist's cramp ===
One of her most important contributions began with a study, in collaboration with Culpin and Eric Farmer, of a condition called "telegraphist's cramp", a type of focal dystonia of the hand which had been thought to be caused by physical fatigue. Their research found evidence of a neurotic component in the condition. It was the basis for further research by Smith and Culpin into psychological factors in other occupational diseases, resulting in 1930 in a "landmark" report entitled The Nervous Temperament. This work was notable both for its results and for its experimental design, which combined interview-based clinical assessments and objective tests. Demonstrating a positive correlation between Culpin's clinical assessments and Smith's test results, the study provided evidence that psychoneurosis is one of the factors responsible for industrial illness. Moreover, it enhanced the legitimacy of clinical psychology, which was a relatively new discipline.

== Career ==
=== Industrial research ===
In 1920, Smith was hired as an investigator by the Industrial Fatigue Research Board, a government agency which became the Industrial Health Research Board in 1928. From the late 1920s, her office was at the London School of Hygiene and Tropical Medicine, where she collaborated closely with the epidemiologist and statistician Major Greenwood and the medical psychologist Millais Culpin. Smith and Culpin, while part of the IFRB, studied the health of WW1 munitions workers via use of a device known as a Dotting Machine, which was made by Edgar Schuster. She was also a part-time researcher for the National Institute of Industrial Psychology, an industry-funded organization that sought to use psychological techniques for vocational guidance and employee selection. Her book, An Introduction to Industrial Psychology, was published in 1943. She retired from the Industrial Health Research Board in 1944.

=== Teaching career ===
Smith taught educational psychology at Cherwell Hall, a training college for secondary teachers.

During World War II she taught at both the London School of Hygiene and at Birkbeck College. During this time some of the worst air raids that occurred in London and for her works she was awarded the O.B.E. in 1945.

Smith had no interest in children; although she had done some teaching she said she couldn't understand them and that for her "people began at eighteen". Although she felt this way, students discovered that she accepted them and as a result, she spoke of the surprise of some Polish students, arriving one morning when the School of Hygiene had been rather badly damaged by blast in the previous night's raid, at finding that staff and students themselves swept away the broken glass and then got on with lectures

== Publications ==
=== "An Autobiography" ===
May Smith wrote, "An Autobiography" in 1949. It was published in the journal Occupational Psychology.

=== "A Contribution to the Study of Fatigue" ===
"A contribution to the study of fatigue" was published in 1916 in the British Journal of Psychology where she found that fatigue involves two distinct phases. In the first phase, fatigue acts as a stimulant which allows work that demands concentrated attention is more effective. In the second phase, the mind loses its ability to concentrate, retain information and becomes overall, inefficient.

Smith also found that following fatigue, the recovery to a normal condition was slow and delayed.

=== An Introduction to Industrial Psychology ===
"An Introduction to Industrial Psychology" was published in 1943. Smith intended for the book to provide insight for people who were either responsible for others, or had to work with others in the industrial field. She discussed fatigue in Industry and the sources behind that fatigue. Smith proves guidance for training and job selection, as well as how to deal with incidents that occur in the industry.

=== "Effects of Alcohol and some other Drugs during Normal and Fatigued Conditions" ===
May Smith wrote this with William McDougall at the request of the Central Control Board for Liquor Traffic. In their work, they discuss mental effects of alcohol as well as chloroform, strychnine, tea, opium and potassium bromide on the fatigued state and normal state.

== Later life ==
May Smith continued to teach part-time at Birkbeck College until 1955. After her retirement from the Industrial Health Research Board, May Smith held several positions on the executive of the British Psychological Society, of which she had been a member since 1914. In 1945, she was appointed to the Order of the British Empire. She was elected an Honorary Fellow of the British Psychological Society in 1958. May Smith died in London on 21 February 1968.
