= Cyril Burt =

English educational psychologist (1883–1971)

Sir Cyril Burt
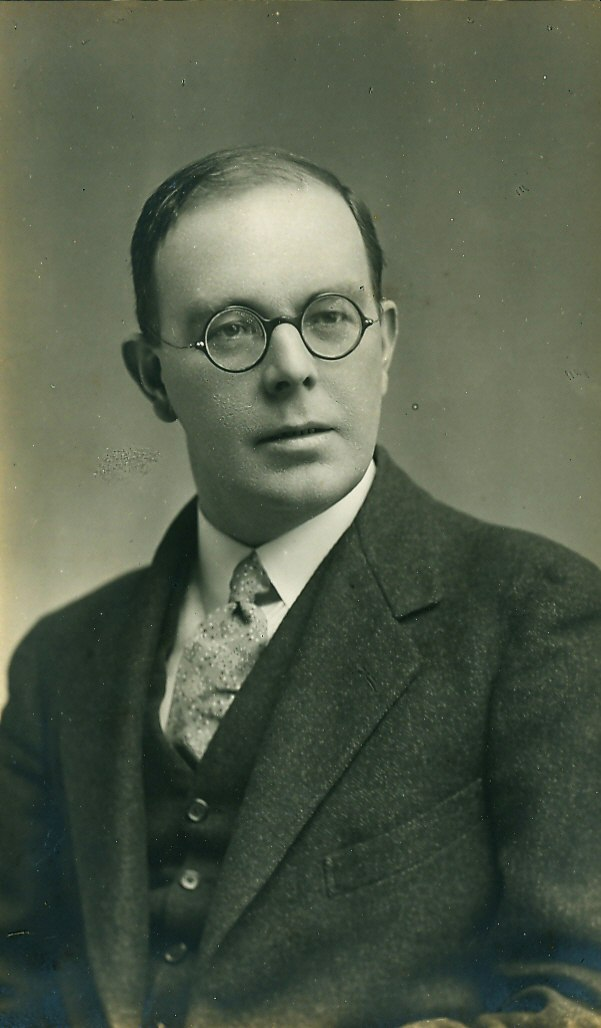
- Cyril Burt in 1930
- Born: Cyril Lodowic Burt; 3 March 1883; Westminster, London, England
- Died: 10 October 1971 (aged 88); London, England
- Education: King's School, Warwick; Christ's Hospital; Jesus College, Oxford
- Known for: Twin study; fraudulent research
- Awards: E. L. Thorndike Award (1968)
- Scientific career
- Workplaces: Liverpool University, London County Council, University College London
- Academic advisors: William McDougall, Charles Scott Sherrington
- Notable students: Raymond Cattell, Hans Eysenck, Arthur Jensen, Chris Brand

Sir Cyril Lodowic Burt, FBA (3 March 1883 – 10 October 1971) was an English educational psychologist and geneticist who also made contributions to statistics. He is known for his studies on the heritability of IQ.

Shortly after he died, his studies of inheritance of intelligence were discredited after evidence emerged indicating he had falsified research data, inventing correlations in separated twins which did not exist, alongside other fabrications.

== Childhood and education ==
Burt was born on 3 March 1883, the first child of Cyril Cecil Barrow Burt (b. 1857), a medical practitioner, and his wife, Martha Decina Evans. He was born in London (some sources give his place of birth as Stratford-upon-Avon, probably because his entry in Who's Who gave his father's address as Snitterfield, Stratford; in fact the Burt family moved to Snitterfield when he was ten).

Burt's father initially kept a chemist shop to support his family while he studied medicine. On qualifying, he became the assistant house surgeon and obstetrical assistant at Westminster Hospital, London. The younger Cyril Burt's education began in London at a Board school near St James's Park.

In 1890, the family briefly moved to Jersey then to Snitterfield, Warwickshire, in 1893, where Burt's father opened a rural practice. Early in Burt's life he showed a precocious nature, so much so that his father often took the young Burt with him on his medical rounds.

One of the elder Burt's more famous patients was Darwin Galton, brother of Francis Galton. The visits the Burts made to the Galton estate not only allowed the young Burt to learn about the work of Francis Galton, but also allowed Burt to meet him on multiple occasions and to be strongly drawn to his ideas; especially his studies in statistics and individual differences, two defining characters of the London School of Psychology whose membership includes both Galton and Burt.

He attended King's (now known as Warwick) School, in the county town, from 1892 to 1895, and later won a scholarship to Christ's Hospital, then located in London, where he developed his interest in psychology.

From 1902, he attended Jesus College, Oxford, where he studied Classics and took an interest in philosophy and psychology, the latter under William McDougall. McDougall, knowing Burt's interest in Galton's work, taught him the elements of psychometrics, thus helping Burt with his first steps in the development and structure of mental tests, an interest that would last the rest of his life. Burt was one of a group of students who worked with McDougall, which included William Brown, John Flügel, and May Smith, who all went on to have distinguished careers in psychology.

Burt graduated with second-class honours in Literae Humaniores (Classics) in 1906, taking a special paper in psychology in his Final Examinations. He subsequently supplemented his BA with a teaching diploma.

In 1907, McDougall invited Burt to help with a nationwide survey of physical and mental characteristics of the British people, proposed by Francis Galton, in which he was to work on the standardization of psychological tests. This work brought Burt into contact with eugenics, Charles Spearman, and Karl Pearson.

In the summer of 1908, Burt visited the University of Würzburg, Germany, where he first met the psychologist Oswald Külpe.

== Work in educational psychology ==
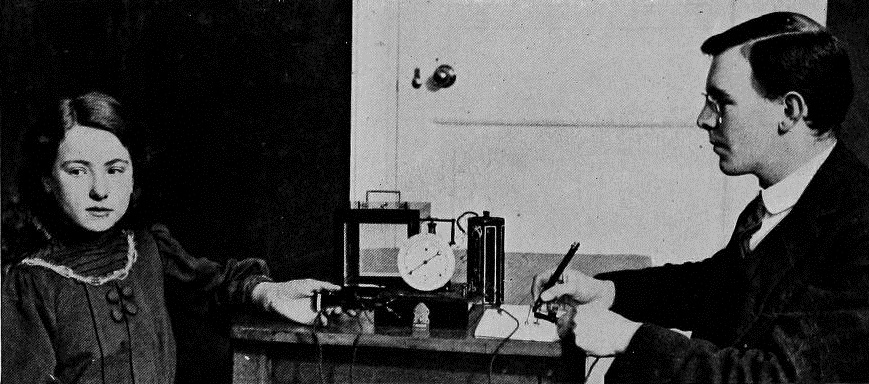
Burt (at the time psychologist to the London County Council) measuring the speed of the thought of a child with a chronoscope

In 1908, Burt took up the post of Lecturer in Psychology and Assistant Lecturer in Physiology at Liverpool University, where he was to work under the famed physiologist Sir Charles Sherrington. In 1909 Burt made use of Charles Spearman's model of general intelligence to analyse his data on the performance of schoolchildren in a battery of tests. This first research project was to define Burt's life's work in quantitative intelligence testing, eugenics, and the inheritance of intelligence. One of the conclusions in his 1909 paper was that upper-class children in private preparatory schools did better in the tests than those in the ordinary elementary schools, and that the difference was innate.

In 1913, Burt took the part-time position of a school psychologist for the London County Council (LCC), with the responsibility of picking out the "feeble-minded" children, in accordance with the Mental Deficiency Act 1913. He notably established that girls were equal to boys in general intelligence. The post also allowed him to work in Spearman's laboratory, and receive research assistants from the National Institute of Industrial Psychology, including Winifred Raphael.

Burt was much involved in the initiation of child guidance in Great Britain and his 1925 publication The Young Delinquent led to opening of the London Child Guidance Clinic in Islington in 1927. In 1924 Burt was also appointed part-time professor of educational psychology at the London Day Training College (LDTC), and carried out much of his child guidance work on the premises.

== Later career ==
In 1931 Burt resigned his position at the LCC and the LDTC after he was appointed professor and Chair of Psychology at University College London, taking over the position from Charles Spearman, thus ending his almost 20-year career as a school psychological practitioner. One of his students, Reuben Conrad, recalled that he once arrived at the university with a chimpanzee that he had borrowed from London Zoo, though Conrad could not recall what point Burt was trying to make. While at London, Burt influenced many students, including Raymond Cattell and Hans Eysenck, and toward the end of his life, Arthur Jensen and Chris Brand. Burt was a consultant with the committees that developed the 11-plus examinations. This issue, and the allegations of fraudulent scholarship against him, are discussed in various books and articles listed below, including Cyril Burt: Fraud or Framed and The Mismeasure of Man.

Despite his lasting reputation as a statistical psychologist Cyril Burt was also involved in psychoanalysis. He was a member of the Tavistock Clinic Council in the early 1930s and of the British Psychoanalytical Society. In The Young Delinquent, he expressed the view that "nearly every tragedy of crime is in its origin a drama of domestic life."

In 1942 Burt was elected president of the British Psychological Society. In 1946 he became the first British psychologist to be knighted for his contributions to psychological testing and for making educational opportunities more widely available, according to an account by J. Philippe Rushton. Burt was a member of the London School of Differential Psychology, and of the British Eugenics Society. Because he had suggested on radio in 1946 the formation of an organization for people with high IQ scores, he was made honorary president of Mensa in 1960. He officially joined Mensa soon thereafter.

Burt retired in 1951 at the age of 68, but continued writing articles and books. He died of cancer at age 88 in London on 10 October 1971.

== Scientific misconduct ==
Burt published numerous articles and books on a host of topics ranging from psychometrics through philosophy of science to parapsychology. It is his research in behaviour genetics, most notably in studying the heritability of intelligence (as measured in IQ tests) using twin studies, that has created the most controversy, frequently referred to as "the Burt Affair".

Shortly after Burt died it became known that all of his notes and records had been burnt, and he was accused of falsifying research data. From the late 1970s, it has been generally accepted that he "fabricated some of the data, though some of his earlier work remained unaffected by this revelation." This was due in large part to research by Oliver Gillie (1976) and Leon Kamin (1974).

The 2007 Encyclopædia Britannica noted it is widely acknowledged that his later work was flawed and many academics agree that data were falsified, though his earlier work is generally accepted as valid.

The possibility of fabrication was first brought to the attention of the scientific community when Kamin noticed that Burt's correlation coefficients of monozygotic and dizygotic twins' IQ scores were the same to three decimal places, across articles – even when new data were twice added to the sample of twins. Leslie Hearnshaw, a close friend of Burt and his official biographer, concluded after examining the criticisms that most of Burt's data from after World War II were unreliable or fraudulent. William H. Tucker argued in a 1997 article, "A comparison of his twin sample with that from other well documented studies, however, leaves little doubt that he committed fraud."

Two other psychologists, Arthur Jensen and J. Philippe Rushton, themselves involved in controversy for their views on race, have claimed that the contentious correlations reported by Burt are in line with the correlations found in other twin studies.

Rushton (1997) wrote that five different studies on twins reared apart by independent researchers corroborated Cyril Burt's findings and gave almost the same heritability estimate (average estimate 0.75 vs. 0.77 by Burt). Jensen argued that "[n]o one with any statistical sophistication, and Burt had plenty, would report exactly the same correlation, 0.77, three times in succession if he were trying to fake the data." Burt's statistical sophistication was, however, called into question by his student Charlotte Banks, who in a foreword to Burt's last book, published posthumously, wrote that he combined samples gathered from schoolchildren in different earlier years in his later papers without comment. In a paper Burt published in 1943, Burt states an average IQ of 153.2 for the parents in the higher professional or administrative classes, at a time when there were no standardised IQ tests for adults in the upper ranges of IQ. In 1961, Burt revised this figure to 139.7 and, in other papers, noted that he had arrived at such figures by "assessment", or guesswork, rather than testing.

According to Earl B. Hunt, it may never be found out whether Burt was intentionally fraudulent or merely careless. Noting that other studies on the heritability of IQ have produced results very similar to those of Burt's, Hunt argues that Burt did not harm science in the narrow sense of misleading scientists with false results, but that in the broader sense science in general and behavioural genetics in particular were profoundly harmed by the Burt Affair, which led to a general rejection of genetic studies of intelligence and a drying up of funding for such studies.

Gillie's 1976 article in The Sunday Times, reprinted in The Phi Delta Kappan in 1977, summarised attempts to trace two of Burt's supposed collaborators, Margaret Howard and J. Conway. Publications attributed to these two were published in a journal edited by Burt between 1952 and 1959, including a joint paper of Burt and Howard, remarkable as one of the few of Burt's research papers, if not the only one, not authored solely by him. The papers in the names of Howard or Conway were published after Burt's retirement from University College, although their affiliations were said to be with University College, Howard's specifically with its Psychology Department. No one with these names was registered as a member of staff or student at University College between 1914 and 1976, or in any other institution within the University of London, and its Psychology Department could not trace either of them. Between 1952 and 1959, Burt lived in London and had two associates, Charlotte Banks and Gertrude Keir, neither of whom ever met Howard or Conway. Although they suggested to Gillie that Burt may have corresponded with the two, there was no trace of any such correspondence in Burt's papers. Burt's housekeeper from 1950 recalled to Gillie that she had questioned Burt on why he had written papers in the names of Howard and Conway; his response was that they had done the research and should be credited. He explained their absence and lack of contact by adding that both had emigrated and he had lost their addresses. On the basis of his investigation, Gillie considered it likely that neither Howard nor Conway existed, but were a fantasy of the ageing Burt himself.

Arthur Jensen was given the opportunity to respond to Gillie's article in the same issue of the same journal, and described the claims as libellous, without evidence, and driven by opposition to Burt's theories. However, he did not address the central issue, that Burt wrote scientific papers and published them as editor of a journal under false names and without the consent of the supposed authors.

In response to articles by Fletcher, claiming that his biography of Burt and attacks by others were motivated by ideological or political malice, Hernshaw added to Gillie's claims by stating that Burt's detailed records of visitors contained no records of visits by Howard or Conway in the years they were supposed to have collaborated with him on collecting and testing 32 pairs of separated monozygotic twins, that his papers contained no correspondence with or written material from them, and that no one close to Burt had met them. He added that testing separated twins was expensive: Burt had no research funds to pay research workers, and his own finances were too stretched to pay for it himself. Further, he instanced two other examples, ignored by Fletcher, of what he terms Burt's deviousness. The first was Burt's falsification of the early history of factorial analysis and his untruthful claim to have been the first to use that technique. The second was that Burt could not have obtained the results on the declining levels of scholastic attainments in the 1950s and 1960s that he claimed to have. Finally, Hernshaw claimed that Burt's failings in his years of retirement went far beyond carelessness.

In his 1991 book, Ronald Fletcher questioned Gillie's claim of the lack of independent articles published by Howard or Conway in scientific journals other than the British Journal of Statistical Psychology, which Burt himself edited, claiming Howard was also said to be mentioned in the membership list of the British Psychological Society, John Cohen was said to have remembered her well during the 1930s, and Donald MacRae had personally received an article from her in 1949 and 1950. According to Fletcher, there is documentary evidence of the existence of Conway. Other writers have suggested that Howard and Conway may have existed, but that Burt simply used their names to support his research, as he had been shown to have done with another named so-called researcher.

Robert Joynson (in 1989) and Ronald Fletcher (in 1991) published books in support of Burt. However Joynson accepted that Burt frequently used assumed names to publish (in the journal Burt edited, the Journal of Statistical Psychology) papers that Burt had written himself: the names he used included those of Howard and Conway. Burt's defenders have claimed that everyone knew that, after his retirement, Burt's data were flawed and that he published articles under pseudonyms, adding that the British Psychological Society could have stopped this if it had violated accepted ethical norms of the time. However, although it is clear that some individual members of the British Psychological Society were aware of Burt's questionable conduct, the reason why he was not censured was likely to be that it would have been in bad taste to call such an esteemed man to public account, a fault that the profession and its members could tolerate at the time and apologise for later.

Nicholas Mackintosh edited Cyril Burt: Fraud or Framed?, which was presented by the publisher as arguing that "his defenders have sometimes, but by no means always, been correct, and that his critics have often jumped to hasty conclusions. In their haste, however, these critics have missed crucial evidence that is not easily reconciled with Burt's total innocence, leaving the perception that both the defence and prosecution cases are seriously flawed." W. D. Hamilton claimed in a 2000 book review shortly before his death that the claims made by Burt's detractors in the so-called "Burt Affair" had been either wrong or grossly exaggerated.

However, Mackintosh himself, then emeritus professor of Experimental Psychology at the University of Cambridge, summed up the evidence against Burt in 1995, saying that the data Burt presented were "so woefully inadequate and riddled with error" that consequently "no reliance (could) be placed on the numbers he present(ed)", and going on to confirm his agreement with Kamin's original conclusion, that Burt had fabricated his data.

== Collections ==
Archival collections related to Burt in the United Kingdom include:

- Liverpool University Special Collections and Archives holds Burt's personal papers (Ref: D191), and the papers of his secretary Margarethe Archer (Ref: D432).
- The British Psychological Society History of Psychology Centre holds Burt's correspondence and reprints, c1920–1971.
- Oxford University Bodleian Library, Special Collections and Western Manuscripts holds Burt's correspondence with CD Darlington, 1960–1966, and correspondence with Society for Protection of Science and Learning, 193–1934 (Ref: SPSL).
- Imperial College London Archives and Corporate Records Unit holds Burt's correspondence with Herbert Dingle, 1951–1959 (Ref: H Dingle collection).
- University College London Special Collections holds letters from Burt to LS Penrose, and between Burt and Professor John White.
