= Progressive League =

British organisation for social reform and the promotion of scientific humanism

- Formation: October 4, 1932; 94 years ago
- Founder: H. G. Wells; C. E. M. Joad
- Dissolved: 2005
- President: C. E. M. Joad
- Vice-Presidents: H. G. Wells; A. S. Neill; Bertrand Russell; Barbara Wootton; Miles Malleson; David Low; Vera Brittain; Cyril Burt; Norman Haire; Aldous Huxley; Kingsley Martin; Harold Nicolson; Beverley Nichols; Olaf Stapledon; Geoffrey West; Rebecca West; Leonard Woolf; J. C. Flügel

The Progressive League was a British organisation for social reform and the promotion of scientific humanism, founded in 1932 by H. G. Wells and C. E. M. Joad under the name "Federation of Progressive Societies and Individuals" (FPSI).

One of the first of a generation of non-governmental organisations, as influenced by Wells' idea of the "open conspiracy", the organisation had its heyday in the 1930s and 1940s, advancing liberal and humanistic approaches to many of the issues that animated the concerns of contemporary intellectuals and freethinkers. The organisation became quieter in the later part of the 20th century as numerous other organisations sprang up as specialised advocates for many of the same causes – many of which had originally spun-off from the League, such as the Marriage Law Reform Society. At the same time, within the humanist movement, other organisations such as the British Humanist Association became prominent as broad platform campaigners for social reform.

== History ==
=== The "Great Conway Hall Plot" ===
In 1931 J. B. (Jack) Coates wrote to the Rationalist Press Association's (RPA) Literary Guide, advocating a form of scientific humanism, which he associated with Bertrand Russell, H. G. Wells and Julian Huxley:

The great work of the modern period, these eminent thinkers argue, is the framing of constructive moral and social policies. The special work of the modern Rationalists should be, therefore, to direct the modern world conscience so as to bring about that scientific world reconstruction which is the goal of the hopes of the scientific humanist.

His call produced a large response in subsequent issues of the Literary Guide. He was opposed by many, however, including the leading rationalist J. M. Robertson, but gained support from the veteran rationalists F. J. Gould, Archibald Robertson and especially C. E. M. Joad, who wanted Conway Hall to become the headquarters of "an association of progressive organizations with humanist aims."

In what became known within the movement as the "Great Conway Hall Plot", a group of nine RPA "modernisers", including Joad, Robertson, Coates and John A. Hobson, stood for the RPA Board on a "scientific humanism" platform. The plot failed and Robertson resigned from the Board in March 1932.

=== Federation of Progressive Societies and Individuals ===
In early 1932 the Conway Hall plotters met at Joad's house, where they decided to form an independent group, the Federation of Progressive Societies and Individuals. The Federation's first conference took place in France, at a chateau owned by Prynce Hopkins. Individual members were invited to a meeting in April 1932.

Meanwhile, on 20 August 1932 the New Statesman published a call from H. G. Wells for a Federation of X Societies, "open conspirators to change the world." It was suggested to Joad that he contact Wells, and on 11 September 1932 another conference took place, this time in England.

C. E. M. Joad was President of the Federation. The vice-presidents included Wells, A. S. Neill, Bertrand Russell, Barbara Wootton, Miles Malleson, David Low, Vera Brittain, Cyril Burt, Norman Haire, Aldous Huxley, Kingsley Martin, Harold Nicolson, Beverley Nichols, Olaf Stapledon, Geoffrey West, Rebecca West, Leonard Woolf and J. C. Flügel.

==== Joad announces the Federation ====
On 4 October 1932 The Guardian published a letter from Joad announcing the formation of the Federation. In his letter Joad noted the existence across the country of a huge number of groups of people of "advanced" opinion. However, they were

small; they preach only to the converted: their literature is read only by their members, and not always by them; and they are politically and socially completely impotent. The influence which they exert upon legislation is negligible, and the cerebrations of statesmen proceed to their indifferent ends unaffected by their activities.

According to Joad, progressive opinion had "crystallised" around a set of positions:

That the economic arrangements of the country should be planned and not haphazard; that war debts should be cancelled, tariff barriers removed, national armaments abolished, and armed force pooled in a collective international police controlled by the League of Nations; that the divorce laws should be changed out of all recognition, birth control information and appliances made available for all, the congenitally unfit sterilised; that the censorship should be abolished, Dora liquidated, Sunday rescued from that dead hand of the nineteenth century; that rural England, what is left of it, should be preserved; that national parks should be established and citizens be given access to mountains and moorlands, irrespective of the needs of “sportsmen”.

The Federation, Joad announced, had been formed out of agreement with these propositions. Joad's letter went on to note that this progressive agenda was not reflected by the "old-fashioned" media, but that "the times ... are serious":

Economic breakdown and international anarchy threaten to destroy civilisation, which, if it persists, seems increasingly likely to pass into the control of those who regard the traditional ideals of democracy - freedom and equality and the right of citizens to live their lives without moral, religious, or political interference - with amused contempt. If democracy were to founder, the intellectuals would be the first to go down in the wreckage. Either Communism or Fascism would give them short shrift, and social and civil liberties... would be swept down the drains of the Corporate or the Communist State as the discarded refuse of an outworn social structure.

Joad identified "vanity, the lack of discipline, the overdeveloped individualities of progressives" as obstacles to organisation, but "danger may effect union where common sense has failed."

Joad concluded: "it is precisely this danger which has called into being a Federation of Progressive Societies to give unity and cohesion to those woefully impotent forces."

==== Failure ====
Initially supported by the Fabian Nursery and the Promethean League, and briefly by Youth House, the FPSI soon found itself without any federated organisational members. Faced with this failure, Joad and J. C. Flügel (a Freudian psychoanalyst) proposed closing the organisation. However, at the urging of Jack Coates, the AGM voted to continue on an individual membership basis.

Some of those involved in the League, realising that it was not to become the umbrella for the left that it was intended to be, found their way back to the RPA and Archibald Robertson "remained active in the RPA for the rest of his life".

The name "Progressive League" was adopted in 1940.

=== After 1940 ===
In 1946 a sub-committee of the League became the Marriage Law Reform Society.

By the 1980s, like many civil society organizations, the League was suffering from a gradual ageing of its membership, and a failure to attract new and younger members. Its events were advertised regularly in the New Statesman, but did not succeed in reversing a gradual decline.

In 2005 the organisation was wound up.

== Journals ==
The League published Plan: For World Order and Progress from April 1934 to September 1939; Plan Bulletin from October 1939 to December 1941; Plan from January 1942 to June 1948; Plan: For Freedom and Progress from July 1948. Plan was published from 1990 to 2002, and the Progressive League Newsletter from 2002 to 2005.

== Manifesto ==
The Progressive League provided a platform for the advocacy of ideas such as world government, Freudian psychology, sex, free love and nudism (hence it was nicknamed by opponents the "Federation for the Promotion of Sexual Intercourse").

Its programme was set out in a "Charter for Rationalists", published in 1932 in Joad's autobiography:

- repeal of the divorce laws
- repeal of discriminatory laws against homosexuality
- diffusion of knowledge on birth control
- legalisation of abortion
- sterilisation of the feeble-minded
- abolition of censorship on plays, films and books
- abolition of all Sabbath restrictions
- disendowment and disestablishment of the Church of England
- conservation of the countryside, curbing urban development, creation of national parks
- prohibition of exhibitions of performing animals
- abolition of licensing restrictions
- unilateral and complete disarmament

According to Tribe, the FPSI's official programme was:

- World government
- Socialisation
- Worldwide education: "humanistic, scientific and cosmopolitan"
- Individual freedom
- Humanisation of criminal law and procedure
- Control and optimal distribution of the world's population (including eugenics)
- Town and country planning

Cooke comments: "the debt to H. G. Wells is enormous. The Federation's programme was essentially Wells's open conspiracy."

== See also ==
- Alexander George Craig
- Humanitarian League, a similar group (1891–1919) which preceded the Progressive League
- Humanists UK, which inherited many of the League's activities

== Bibliography ==
- Cooke, Bill (2003). The Blasphemy Depot: A Hundred Years of the Rationalist Press Association. London: RPA. ISBN 978-0301003023.
- Coupland, Philip (2000). "H. G. Wells's "Liberal Fascism" ", Journal of Contemporary History, Vol. 35 (4), pp. 541-558. jch.sagepub.com
- Forsyth, Dorothy (2002). "Notes on the History of the Progressive League", Ethical Record, Vol. 107 (8), October, pp. 3–7 (summary of a lecture to the Ethical Society, 17 March 2002).
- Tribe, David (1967). 100 Years of Freethought. London: Elek.
- Walter, Nicolas (1997). Humanism: What's in the Word. London: RPA/BHA/Secular Society Ltd. ISBN 0-301-97001-7
