= Pelham Horton Box =

British historian (1898–1937)

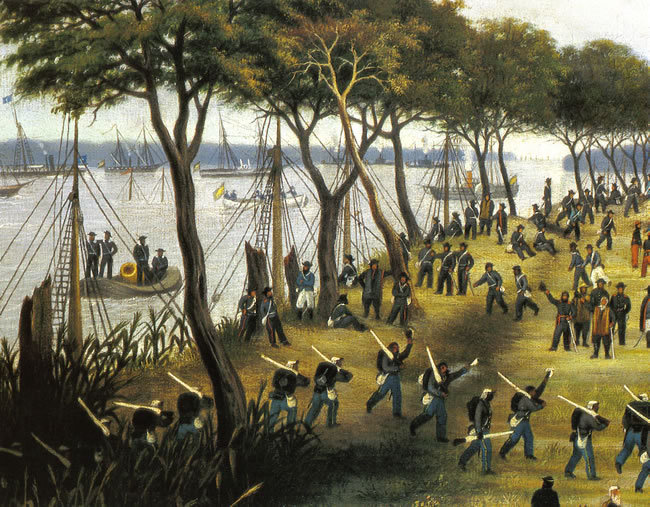
Paraguayan War. The Brazilian navy ferries Argentine troops to a forward base in Paraguay. (Cándido López, 1840–1902, detail)

Pelham Horton Box (1898–1937) was a British historian, best known for his book The Origins of the Paraguayan War (1930): the first to attempt to find out, by a comprehensive investigation of the available documents, what caused the most lethal war in South American history.

Box was described as a Trotskyist with a sense of humour, but in general his book is not written from an explicitly Marxist perspective. In its estimation Paraguay's authoritarian ruler Francisco Solano López was vain, ambitious, brutal, and politically and diplomatically inept; even so, the book rejects the "reckless dictator" theory of the war's origins, according to which López alone was to blame for the disaster, and looks to a web of antecedent causes.

== Life ==
=== Family background ===
Box was born on March 29, 1898, at Walton-on-the-Naze, Essex, elder son of George Herbert Box and Georgiana Beatrice Mary Horton.

The Box family, which was to produce three distinguished academics, came from modest circumstances in the port of Gravesend, Kent, where his grandfather was a grocer's assistant who set up a small discount hardware shop. Box's father managed to escape the intellectual poverty of his time and situation. Somebody, perhaps his father, paid for him to attend the prestigious Merchant Taylors' School; there, benefactors had endowed scholarships to St John's College, Oxford which could be won by prowess in classical Hebrew. After graduating from Oxford the father became a lecturer in rabbinical Hebrew at King's College London, a canon of the Church of England and a professor of Old Testament Studies at the University of London; his publications drew attention to the influence of the Jewish apocrypha on early Christianity.

Box's father ceased to maintain contact with his Gravesend relatives, who fell on hard times; he did not name his parents in his Who's Who entry. A nephew, George Edward Pelham Box, likewise climbed out of obscurity in Gravesend and was made a Fellow of the Royal Society for his innovations in the science of statistics.

=== Education and career ===
Pelham Horton Box attended his father's old school Merchant Taylors' and entered King's College London as an occasional student at the age of 16. In the First World War he joined the British Army as a private soldier, an unusual choice for one in his circumstances. He was promoted to sergeant in the Egyptian Expeditionary Force, serving under General Allenby and being mentioned in dispatches.

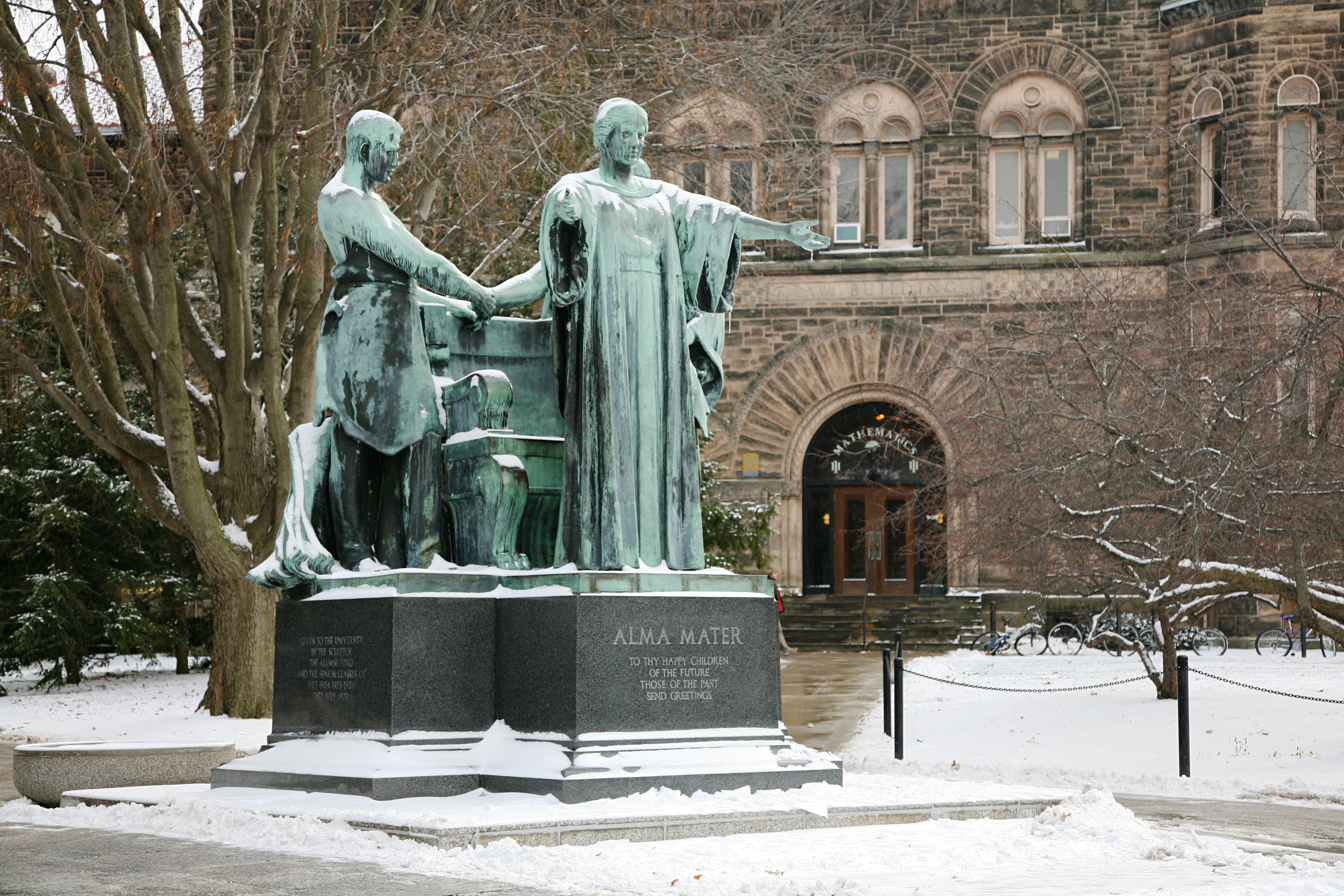
University of Illinois. Alma Mater by Lorado Taft with Altgeld Hall in background

After the war he attended Christ Church, Oxford, graduating in Modern History; after doing some postgraduate work, he was appointed assistant lecturer in Modern History at the University of St Andrews. While there he published his first book (1925).

In 1925 he obtained a Commonwealth Fund fellowship, one of 20 that allowed British graduates to experience American postgraduate education. It enabled him to do research at the University of Illinois where he was supervised by William Spence Robertson, professor of Latin American history — such a thing did not then exist in England — and to travel in the United States; the stipend was generous. At Illinois he completed a PhD, his thesis being a first version of The Origins of the Paraguayan War. In 1927 he was elected a member of the prestigious Phi Beta Kappa fraternity. In 1929 he was appointed to a lectureship in History at the University of Bristol, finishing his book in the light of further sources. In 1932 Box travelled to Russia, a country he admired for its seeming social progress. Before his early death he held lectureships at Birkbeck College and King's College London.

=== Personality and political outlook ===
Three academic colleagues — R. A. Humphreys, William Parker Morrell and Levi Robert Lind — knew Box personally. Many years later — by now emeritus professors — they left reminiscences of him. Humphreys (1982) said he was "one of the most stimulating conversationalists I have ever known" and that his early death was a great loss to Latin American studies. According to Morrell (1979), Box "had an endless flow of conversation, had Trotskyist views but more tolerance of other people's opinions and a keener sense of humour than most men of his way of thinking". Lind, who wrote the most detailed memoir, and did so at the age of 91, recalled that Box was "brilliant and charming", would talk until dawn broke, thought the British Communist Party was manned by doctrinaire misfits, and was an admirer of Lenin, Trotsky ("genius") and the Marquis de Sade ("this great subversive thinker").

=== Death ===
Box died on 23 May 1937 of pneumococcal peritonitis, unusual in England for a man of 39. He never married. He had amassed a collection of works by the Marquis de Sade and others, banned at that time for obscenity: his estate (which perforce was administered by his mother, Canon Box's widow) sold them to the anti-censorship campaigner Alexander George Craig; they are now in the Craig Collection at the Senate House Library, London (“16th floor, locked”).

== Political histories ==
Box's first book (1925) was Three Master Builders and Another. It is a biography of four prominent leaders of the early 1920s: Lenin, Eleftherios Venizelos, Mussolini and Woodrow Wilson. The reader is left decide which of the four built no lasting political foundation.

Russia (1933) is a short history of the country from its earliest times to Soviet rule. Wrote Lind:

Russia continued to fascinate Pelham and to arouse perhaps his deepest political commitment to the society of the future which he perceived in its early devotion to Communism.

The later pages mention the rise of Stalin, and Lenin's Testament, in which the dying revolutionary warned that Stalin had gathered too much power into his hands.

== Paraguayan War ==
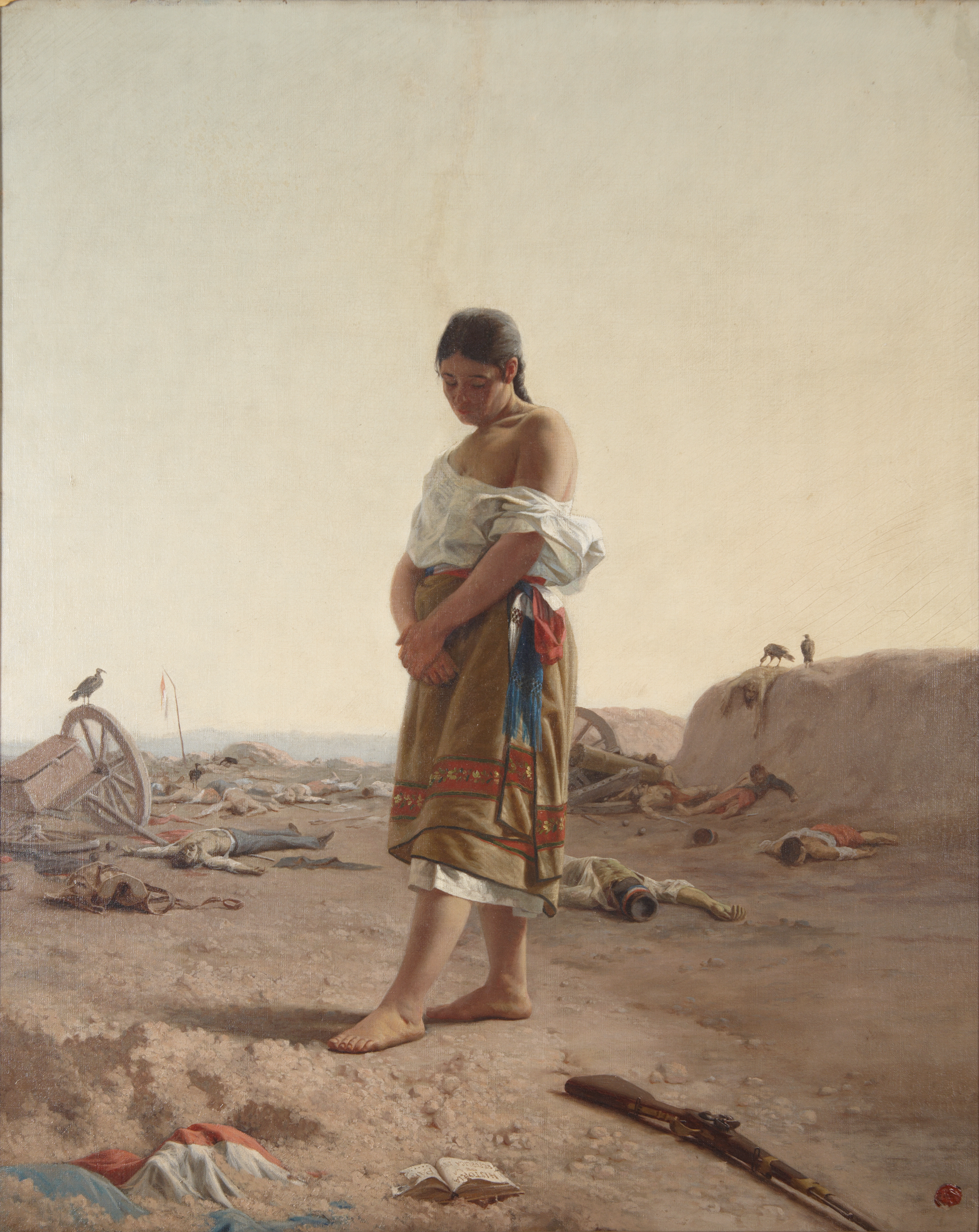
La Paraguaya, symbolising the country's utter devastation. (Juan Manuel Blanes, 1830–1901)

The Paraguayan War (1864–1870) for its unusual features has fascinated scholars of Latin America; it remains controversial to this day.

Paraguay was a landlocked country with a history of keeping to itself. Yet in 1864 — under the direction of its new president, Francisco Solano López — it declared war on the Empire of Brazil, which had probably 20 times its population at least. The next year it declared war on Argentina too. These were not mere paper declarations: the Brazilian province of Mato Grosso was occupied by a Paraguayan army and its capital was sacked; and in the occupied Argentine province of Corrientes, Paraguayan currency was made obligatory on pain of death.

By attacking not only Brazil but Argentina, Paraguay drove both countries into a formal military alliance, even though, traditionally, they had been mutual enemies. Further, by allying Brazil with Argentina, Paraguay gave the immense Brazilian empire and its powerful navy what it had lacked so far: a good base of operations against Paraguay. For Box, this "deliberate accumulation of enemies" was "the summit of political folly'.

In the Treaty of the Triple Alliance Brazil, Argentina and (for good measure) Uruguay pledged they would not lay down their arms until Francisco Solano López was deposed.

Despite the odds, López refused to abdicate, and Paraguay refused to give up, fighting on until 1870, when López was killed. On a conservative estimate Paraguay lost at least a quarter of its population, mainly through famine and disease. The true death rate may have been very much higher.

All this seemed to call for an explanation. Most popular, at first, was the "reckless dictator" theory, according to which Paraguay had been driven to self-destruction by López.

=== Origins ===
In The Origins of the Paraguayan War (1930), Box wrote the first systematic account in English (and probably, in any language) that sought to investigate and assemble the manifold causes of the war by examining the documentary sources.

Box's book for the most part is not an explicit attempt to understand the Paraguayan war through the lens of a Marxist interpretation of history. It is a traditional, predominantly diplomatic, account, and "Historical writing was always likely to put him on his most formal behavior". However it challenges the monocausal "reckless dictator" theory.

Box did support the then conventional view that Francisco Solano López was vain, ambitious, brutal, and politically and diplomatically inept. He did not play down López's role in the disaster:

It is therefore necessary to spend some time on the life and personality of Francisco Solano López, who was elected President of Paraguay in succession to his father in October, 1862, and whose fateful decisions in November, 1864, and March, 1865, precipitated a five-year struggle of desperate ferocity, ending, after unparalleled disasters, in his own violent death, the utter ruin of the Paraguayan Republic and the all but complete extermination of the Paraguayan people, the chief victims of a war in which, from first to last, perhaps half a million human beings perished by the sword, by famine and by disease. Inevitably we must ask ourselves many questions about this ruler whose people followed him beyond the last man and whose army at the end had boys of eleven and twelve in the ranks and women as its beasts of burden.

However, Box explicitly rejected the theory that López, or any one man, caused, the war.

It is scarcely necessary to state that like all purely personal interpretations of history this will not bear the test of a close examination.

"What emerges most clearly is the fact that the war germinated in the political and economic instability of the states of the Río de la Plata at this period in the history of South America. The uncertain and shifting factors were Argentina, Uruguay and, to a less extent, Brazil". The complex set of circumstances he described went back deep into the colonial era. The following is a bare summary of what Box wrote.

Territorial disputes in the Platine region in 1864

Argentina and Uruguay, and even Brazil, were not the stable nation-states of today. They were fluid entities with disputed boundaries. Unlike Paraguay — where the government was obeyed without question — they were beset by contending factions. Those factions, which even had their own armies, not only struggled for power locally: often, they sought outside backing, meddling in the politics of neighbouring countries to get it. In the 1860s, abandoning its traditional isolationist policy, Paraguay allowed itself to be sucked into these regional conflicts.

Further, there were major international boundary disputes and tensions over the navigation of international waterways. Indirectly, the Paraguayan War helped to stabilise the political geography of those parts of South America and consolidate the Argentine nation.

A serious López miscalculation was to think that if he were to attack Argentina, its provincial caudillos (local strongmen) would come out on his side. Although some did, the most important, Justo José de Urquiza, virtual ruler of Entre Rios Province, did not.

Owing to Box's premature death his book is now out of copyright, apparently in all countries. It can be read as an external link to this article.

=== Publication history ===
The Origins of the Paraguayan War — the complete work, not just the PhD thesis — was first published in two parts in 1930 in University of Illinois Studies in the Social Sciences, a paperback quarterly. It was reprinted in 1967 in a single hardback volume by Russell & Russell of New York; the pagination was preserved.

The book was translated into Spanish by Pablo Max Ynsfrán. Ynsfrán added critical footnotes where he thought it was mistaken. It was published in 1936 by La Colmena of Asunción. A second edition was printed in 1958 by Nizza of Buenos Aires.

=== Reception ===
==== By scholars ====
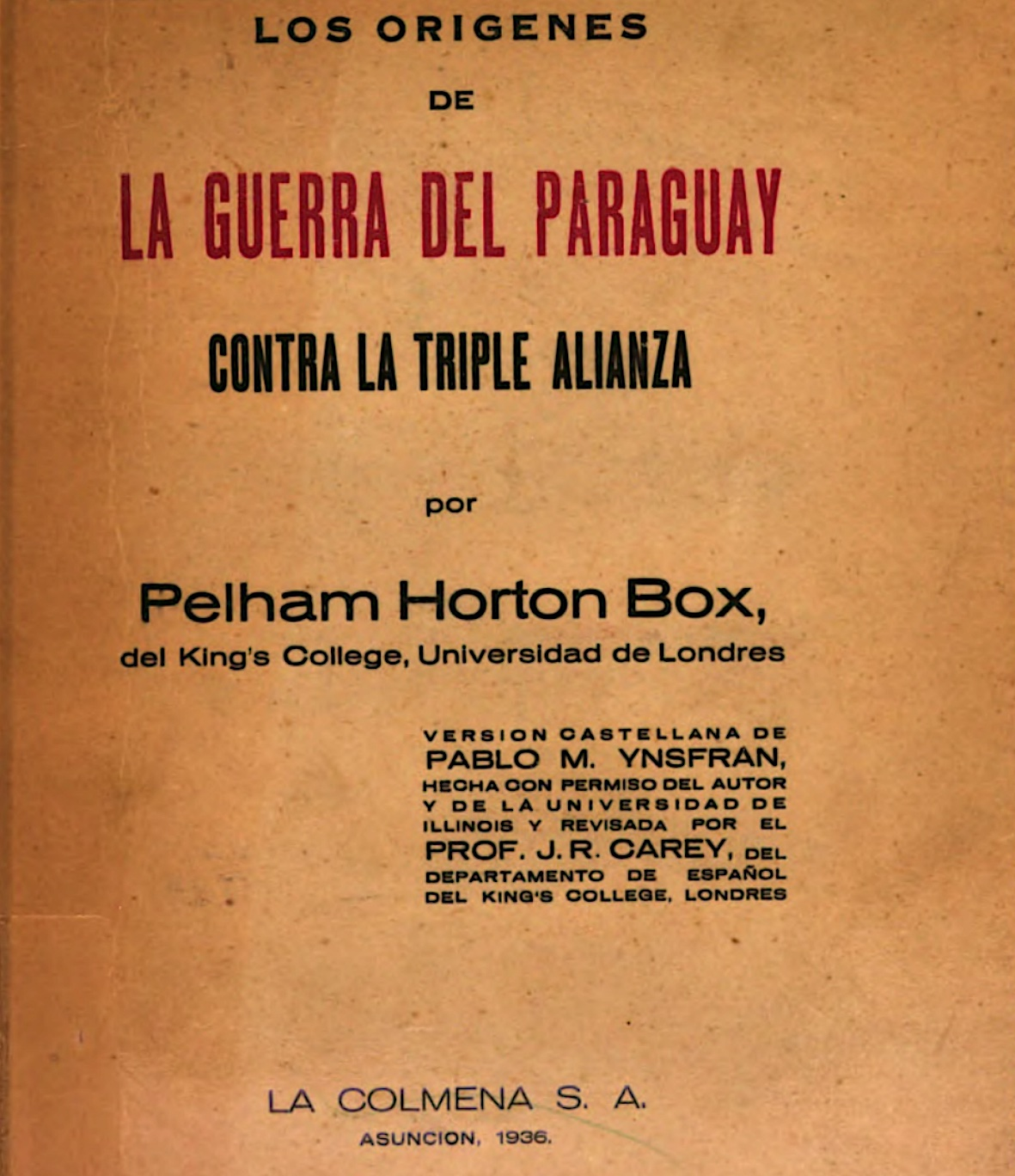
Cover of the first Spanish edition (detail)

In The Historiography of the Río de la Plata Area Since 1830, Joseph Barager writing in 1959 said Box's work was the most objective study of the origins of the conflict. David Bushnell in his survey of South American historiography (1985) said it "still ranks as one of the major works in the field of Latin American international relations". Harris Gaylord Warren, the first American Paraguayanist, said Box "displayed extraordinary energy and skill in presenting the most reasonable explanation of the war's causes that has appeared in print". R.A. Humphreys, Britain's first professor of Latin American studies, said Box's book was a classic.

Pablo Max Ynsfrán, formerly chargé d'affaires of the Paraguayan legation in Washington DC, and afterwards professor of Latin American history at the University of Texas, who sought permission to translate the book into Spanish, wrote:

This work is the first systematic effort to gather together the complex and multiple factors that, directly or indirectly, concurred to precipitate the war of the Triple Alliance. Until now, strictly speaking, its historical and political antecedents have not been considered in a general and comprehensive framework. For national or polemical motives, historians — mostly, sons of the countries involved in the conflict, and often direct participants themselves — have been more concerned with certain unilateral aspects of the struggle than with elaborating an organic work, in which the vast web of events leading to the catastrophe of 1865–70 can be appreciated in all its breadth.

The merit of Dr. Pelham Horton Box consists precisely in trying to fill this gap in the literature of the war. Of course, his book has flaws — some of considerable importance — that the critics will surely be responsible for pointing out. But having perceived that void, the young English academic already reveals a researcher's sharp eye, amply confirmed in the following pages (not a few traced by a master's hand), by his summing up, by the technique used in the deployment of the documentation and for the sagacity that prevails in them.

Thomas L. Whigham, the doyen of present-day Paraguayanists, said Box's pioneering work should have inspired a whole generation of historians, but he died young and left few heirs, except Efraím Cardozo; and "I find particularly impressive the thoroughness of his examination of official documents and pamphlets outlining changing state policies in Argentina and Uruguay. In my opinion, his findings have not been matched, except possibly by Cardozo, since that time". Since Whigham himself, in the 21st century, had published the most detailed account of the Paraguayan war and its causes, this was considerable praise.

==== By Paraguayan nationalists ====
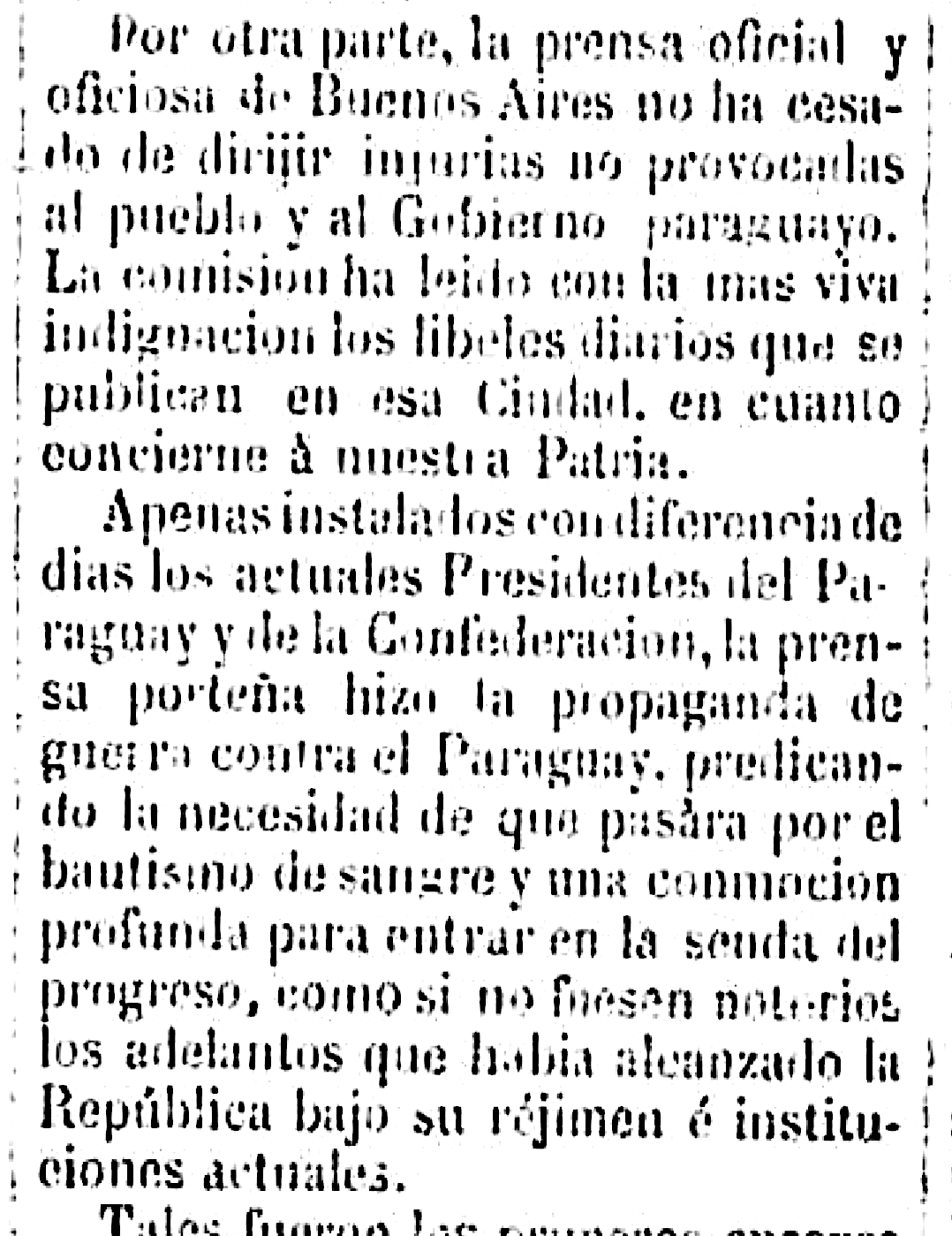
El Semanario, 25 March 1865. The insulting attitude of Buenos Aires newspapers is given as one of the grounds for declaring war.

In the 20th century revisionist historians associated with the Colorado Party began to resurrect the image of Francisco Solano López. A nationalist and racist movement developed that glorified the army and military rule. After a series of coups and elections the pro-fascist Higinio Morínigo was first in an unbroken line of dictators that ruled Paraguay for fifty years and included Alfredo Stroessner. López's bones were dug up and reinterred in Asunción's National Pantheon of the Heroes; Stroessner portrayed himself as the natural successor to López, who was re-interpreted as Paraguay's greatest military leader. In those circumstances the second edition of the Spanish version of Box's book (1958) was not published in Paraguay, but in Argentina; in February 1936 its translator had gone into exile.

At the height of the dictatorship, Harris Gaylord Warren of Miami University wrote an article describing how Paraguayans understood the war of the Triple Alliance. For them, enemy propaganda had succeeded in presenting López as a ruthless and ambitious dictator who went to war because he was enraged by the libels of the Buenos Aires press and deceived by Uruguayan diplomacy, yet López had only been concerned to maintain the balance of power and preserve Paraguay's integrity. Wrote Warren

The thesis that the War of the Triple Alliance was caused by a ruthless and ambitious dictator who was enraged by libels in the Porteño press and duped by Uruguayan blandishments received the approval of such scholars as ... Pelham Horton Box of England.

Whether Warren thought so himself is doubtful, but anyway it is contrary to the explicit thesis of Box's book. Box did mention, as was the fact, that the Paraguayan government itself had cited the attitude of the Buenos Aires press as one of the official grounds for declaring war on Argentina. That the Uruguayan government by secret manoeuvring tried to persuade Paraguay to make war on Buenos Aires, Box demonstrated in Chapter VI of his book. Not only had Box the documents to prove it; the Paraguayan government itself publicised the diplomatic intrigues in order to embarrass the Uruguayans. López may or may not have been influenced by this campaign, but Box did not claim he was duped.

=== Coda: Box and Paraguay's "state socialism" ===
Very occasionally, Box writes a passage in an unmistakably Marxist vein. For example, he thus described the regime of José Gaspar Rodríguez de Francia (1766–1840), founder of the Paraguayan state, whose official designation was Perpetual Dictator of the Republic:

Dr. Francia had made himself feared where he was not respected. He won the passionate veneration of the depressed classes whose cause he was never weary of defending. The Guaraní population was the veritable foundation of his dictatorship; the aristocracy and bourgeoisie, Spanish and native alike, were its only enemies. He was remorseless in crushing his enemies, who were also the exploiters of the Guaraní peasantry, and with true revolutionary insight grasped the importance of the confiscation of property in overthrowing the dominance of a class. The transference of property is, he realized, more effective than death. His terrorism succeeded because, like all successful terrorisms, it was directed against a small though important section of the population...

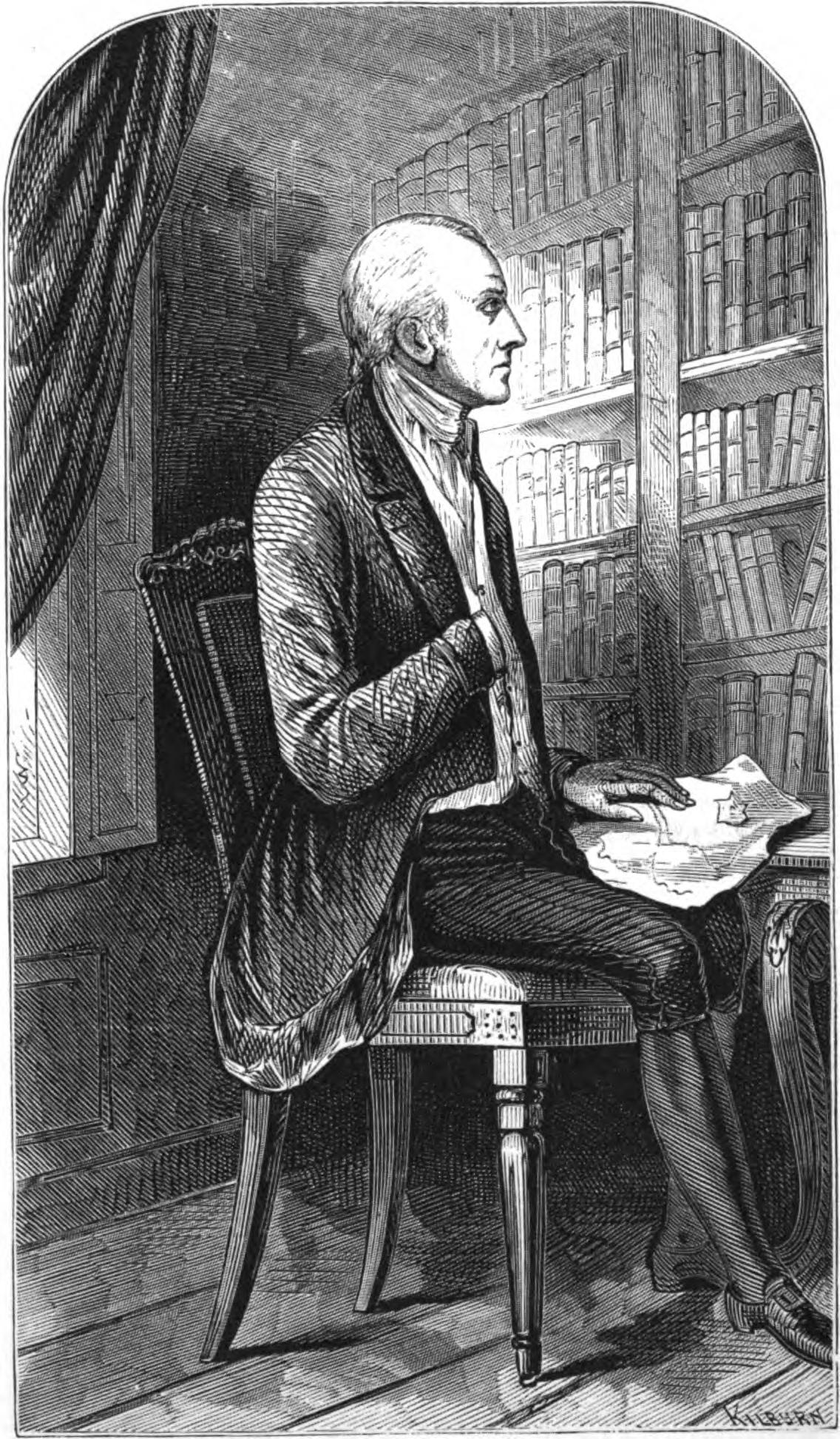
Dr Francia, first ruler of Paraguay 1814–40

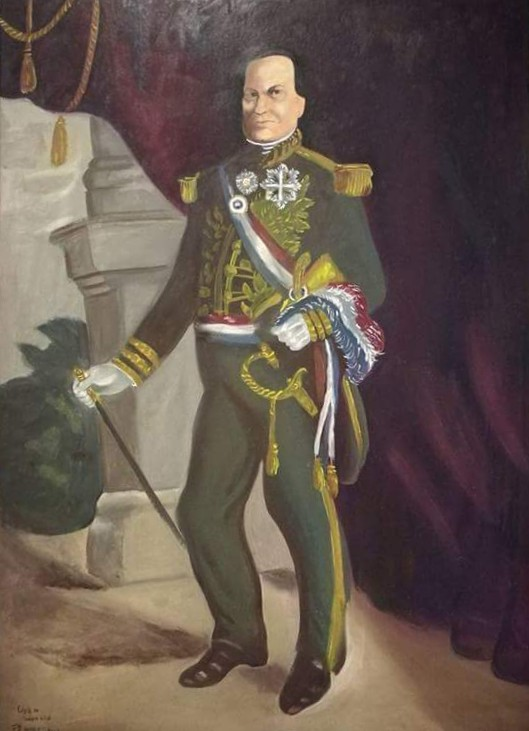
Carlos Antonio López, second ruler 1841–62

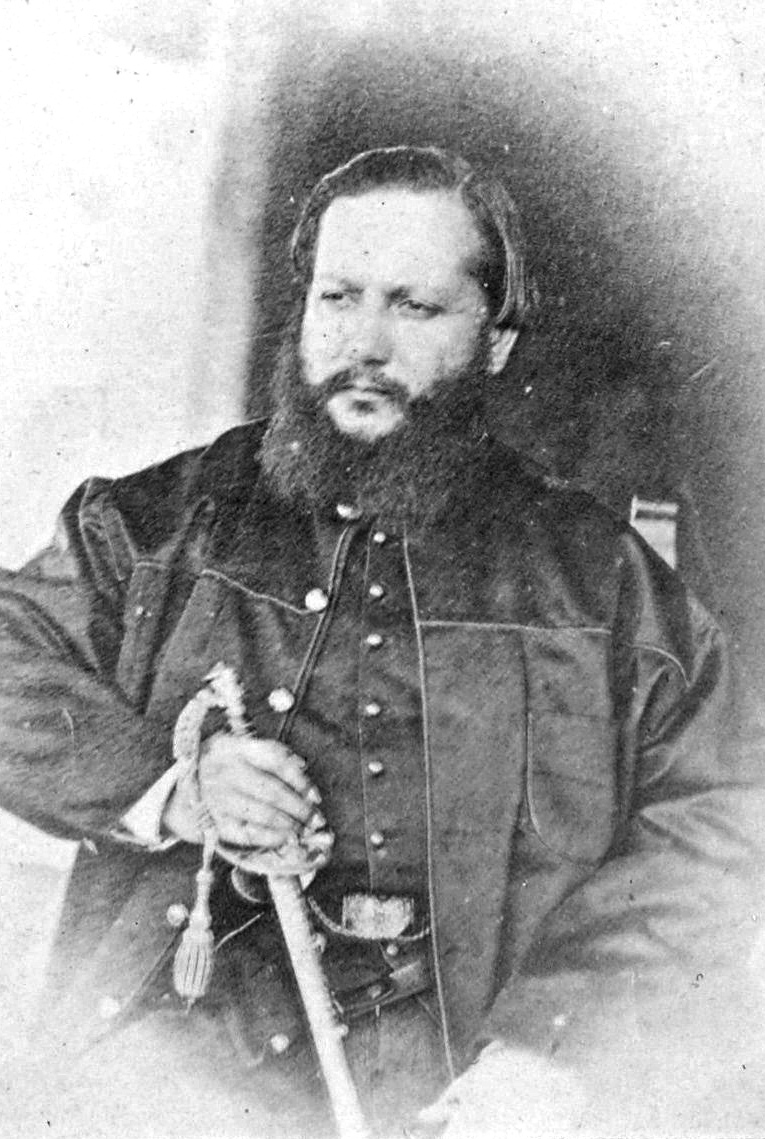
Francisco Solano López, third ruler 1862–70

All such systems as that founded by Dr. Francia and continued and developed by his two successors of the López dynasty must be characterized by "paternalism” and the omnipotence of the state. Such systems exist to prevent the growth or continuance of that complex of vested interests produced by private enterprise whose liberty is cardinal to bourgeois régimes. Therefore such liberty is replaced by state control and bureaucracy. The logical outcome of such control is the state socialism represented by the government monopoly of yerba under Francia, extended to tobacco under Carlos Antonio López, who thus excluded the two staple products of the country from the operations of laissez faire. In the later phases of the dictatorship something approaching a state monopoly of foreign trade was established in Paraguay. The growth of an independent trading and commercial middle class was thus prevented and a fascinating social evolution begun in that land that had already witnessed the rise and progress of the Jesuit Communist Empire.

Commenting on this passage, Pablo Max Ynsfrán said that it did not correspond to the social reality of Paraguay of the time. Nevertheless, it prefigured a line of 'revisionist' scholarship that was influential in the mid-20th century.

"In bald outline", wrote David Rock, "this interpretation stresses the progressiveness of the Paraguayan state before the war. With its weak landed class and insignificant church, its precocious railroads and incipient industrial economy, its disdain for foreign trade and drive toward economic self-sufficiency, Paraguay has been characterized as following a course toward a burst of nondependent development. The war, however, cut short and destroyed these trends, dooming Paraguay to become an anarchic backwater, the prey of Brazilian and Argentine liberals and their imperialist backers in Europe". Thus, the Great Soviet Encyclopedia defined the Paraguayan War as "a war of aggression waged by Brazil, Argentina, and Uruguay against Paraguay between 1864 and 1870. Great Britain, France, and the USA — seeking unhindered access for their capital in Paraguay — furthered the unleashing of a war that had long been planned by Brazilian slaveowners and the Argentinian bourgeois landowning elite".

However, in Trade Contraction and Economic Decline: The Paraguayan Economy under Francia, 1810–1840, Mario Pastore pointed out that

The bulk of government revenues, before and after the confiscations, were devoted to assuring the army's support... Rule-making power thus remained firmly in government hands, which exercised it without having to obtain the consent of the taxed.

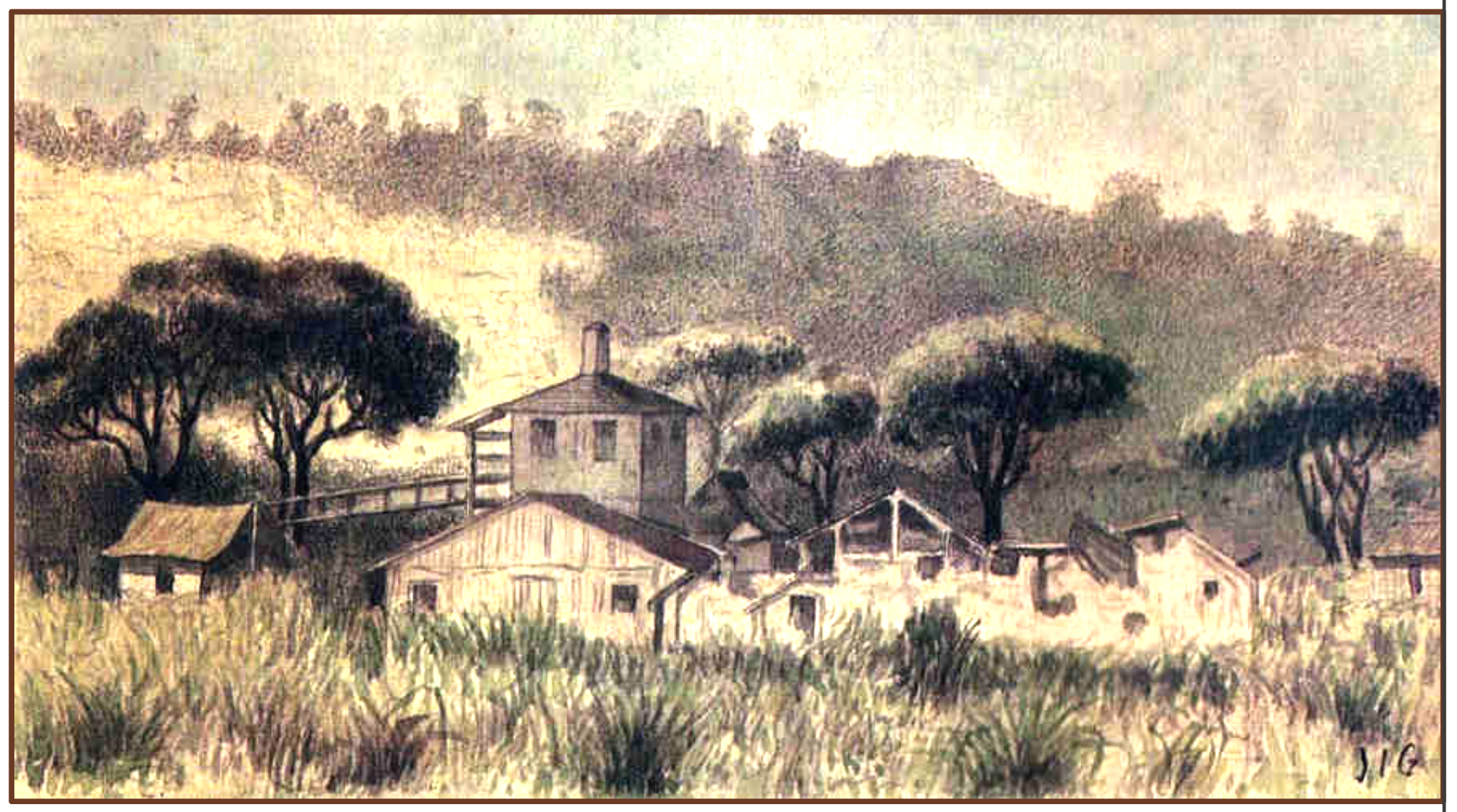
The Ironworks of Ibicuy, an instance of state socialism (for some), of misguided military expenditure (for others). (José Ignacio Garmendia, 1840–1925)

Its political structure more closely resembled an absolute monarchy. Colonial absolutism, militarism, and mercantilist economic regulation persisted in early national Paraguay and were actually exacerbated in the short run.

John Hoyt Williams summarised it thus:

It bears note that virtually all of the modernization and "industry" carried out in this period was military, or defensive in nature. This applies to the railroad, the arsenal, Ibicuy's foundry, the telegraph, the naval vessels, the military advisors, the army medical corps, and Humaitá and other fortresses. It would not then be an overstatement to say that Paraguay's leap into the mid-nineteenth century was on one foot only, an unbalanced development at best which left the average Paraguayan scratching in the soil with the same instruments and ideas used two centuries before.

== Sources ==
=== General ===
- Barager, Joseph R. (1959). "The Historiography of the Río de la Plata Area Since 1830". The Hispanic American Historical Review. 39 (4): 588–642. doi:10.2307/2510383. JSTOR 2510383.
- Bethell, Leslie (1996). "The Paraguayan War (1864–1870)" (PDF). ISA Research Papers. 46. London: Institute of Latin American Studies. ISBN 1-900039-08-7.
- Box, Pelham H. (1925). Three Master Builders and Another: Studies in Modern Revolutionary and Liberal Statesmanship. London: Jarrolds.
- Box, Pelham Horton (1930). The Origins of the Paraguayan War. University of Illinois, reprinted from the University of Illinois Studies in the Social Sciences Vol. xv, numbers 3-4, pp. 421-765 (rep. 1967 Russell & Russell. N.Y.).
- Box, Pelham Horton (1933). Russia. Bristol: Arrowsmith.
- Bushnell, David (1985). "South America". The Hispanic American Historical Review. 65 (4): 767–787. doi:10.2307/2514895. JSTOR 2514895.
- Chesterton, Bridget; Whigham, Thomas (2021). "Paraguayan War (War of the Triple Alliance)". Oxford Bibliographies. Oxford University Press. doi:10.1093/OBO/9780199766581-0159.
- Commonwealth Fund (1926). "Division of Education: Commonwealth Fund Fellowships". Seventh Annual Report for the year 1924–1925. New York: The Commonwealth Fund. pp. 14 v.
- Commonwealth Fund (1950). Directory of British Fellows 1925–1950. New York: The Commonwealth Fund.
- El Semanario (25 March 1865). "Honorables Señores Representantes de la Nación" (PDF).
- Espley, Richard (2016). "Alec Craig, Censorship and the Literary Marketplace: A Bookman's Struggles". In Wilson, Nicola Louise (ed.). The Book World: Selling and Distributing British Literature, 1900–1940. Leyden: Brill. ISBN 9789004315860.
- Great Soviet Encyclopedia (n.d.). Paraguayan War (3rd (1970–1979) ed.).
- Helleiner, Eric; Rosales, Antulio (2017). "Peripheral Thoughts for International Political Economy: Latin American Ideational Innovation and the Diffusion of the Nineteenth Century Free Trade Doctrine". International Studies Quarterly. 61 (4): 924–934. doi:10.1093/isq/sqx063.
- Humphreys, R.A.; Collier, Simon (1982). "An Interview with R. A. Humphreys". The Hispanic American Historical Review. 62 (2): 180–192. doi:10.2307/2514977. JSTOR 2514977.
- Lind, L.R. (1997). "Pelham Horton Box, Modern Historian (1898–1937)". Classical and Modern Literature: A Quarterly. 18. Terre Haute: CML: 95–108.
- Lynch, John (2001). "Robert Arthur Humphreys (1907–1999)". Hispanic American Historical Review. 81 (1): 135–137. doi:10.1215/00182168-81-1-135.
- Morrell, William Parker (1979). Memoirs. New York: McIndoe. ISBN 0-908565-99-2.
- Nickson, Andrew (1989). "The Overthrow of the Stroessner Regime: Re-Establishing the Status Quo". Bulletin of Latin American Research. 8 (2): 185–209. doi:10.2307/3338752. JSTOR 3338752.
- Pastore, Mario (1994a). "State-Led Industrialisation: The Evidence on Paraguay, 1852–1870". Journal of Latin American Studies. 26 (2): 295–324. doi:10.1017/S0022216X00016230. JSTOR 157945. S2CID 210209479.
- Pastore, Mario (1994b). "Trade Contraction and Economic Decline: The Paraguayan Economy under Francia, 1810–1840". Journal of Latin American Studies. 26 (3): 539–595. doi:10.1017/S0022216X0000852X. JSTOR 158308. S2CID 153526606.
- Rock, David (1994). "Review: The Politics of River Trade: Tradition and Development in the Upper Plata, 1780–1870. by Thomas Whigham". Latin American Research Review. 29 (1): 172–183. doi:10.1017/S0023879100035391. JSTOR 2503651.
- Senate House Library (n.d.). "Craig Collection". University of London.
- Smith, A.F.M. (2015). "George Edward Pelham Box. 10 October 1919 – 28 March 2013". Biographical Memoirs of Fellows of the Royal Society. 61: 23–37. doi:10.1098/rsbm.2015.0015. S2CID 74723672.
- Warren, Harris Gaylord (1949). Paraguay: An Informal History. University of Oklahoma Press.
- Warren, Harris Gaylord (1962). "The Paraguayan Image of the War of the Triple Alliance". The Americas. 19 (1): 3–20. doi:10.2307/979403. JSTOR 979403. S2CID 147037119.
- Warren, Harris Gaylord (1983). "Review: Socialism, Liberalism, and Dictatorship in Paraguay by Paul H. Lewis". The Hispanic American Historical Review. 63 (1): 202–203. JSTOR 2515393.
- Weisiger, Alex (2013). "War to the Death in Paraguay". Logics of War: Explanations for Limited and Unlimited Conflicts. Cornell University Press. pp. 86–104. ISBN 978-0-8014-5186-7. JSTOR 10.7591/j.ctt1xx5pk.7.
- Whigham, Thomas L. (2018). The Paraguayan War: Causes and Early Conduct (2nd ed.). Calgary: University of Calgary Press. ISBN 978-1-55238-994-2.
- Whigham, Thomas; Casal, Juan Manuel; Braschi, Dardo Ramírez (2020). "La cuestión de perspectiva en los orígenes de la Guerra del Paraguay. Una conversación entre Thomas Whigham, Juan Manuel Casal and Dardo Ramírez Braschi". Folia Histórica del Nordeste (in Spanish) (38): 137–156. doi:10.30972/fhn.0384466. ISSN 2525-1627. S2CID 225398940.
- Whigham, Thomas, ed. (2021). La Guerra Guazú: conversaciones y reflexiones de historiadores extranjeros sobre la epopeya paraguaya (in Spanish) (Kindle ed.). Asunción: Intercontinental Editora.
- Williams, John Hoyt (1977). "Foreign Tecnicos and the Modernization of Paraguay, 1840–1870". Journal of Interamerican Studies and World Affairs. 19 (2). Cambridge University Press: 233–257. doi:10.2307/174705. JSTOR 174705.
- Williams, John Hoyt (1979). The Rise and Fall of the Paraguayan Republic, 1800–1870. Austin: Institute of Latin American Studies; University of Texas Press. ISBN 978-0-292-77017-1.
- Williams, Mary Wilhemine (1930). "Review: The Origins of the Paraguayan War, by Pelham Horton Box". The Hispanic American Historical Review. 10 (3): 353–354. JSTOR 2506379.
- Who's Who and Who Was Who. A & C Black. 2017.
- Ynsfrán, Pablo M. (1936). Los orígenes de la guerra del Paraguay contra la triple alianza por Pelham Horton Box (in Spanish) (1 ed.). Asunción: La Colmena.

=== Newspapers ===
- "Death of Canon G.H. Box". Biggleswade Chronicle and Bedfordshire Gazette. 6 January 1933. p. 3.
- "Dr. P. H. Box". The Times. London. 28 May 1937. p. 18.

=== Public records of the United Kingdom ===
- George Box (1871). Census England (Report). Kew, London, England: National Archives. Class: RG10; Piece: 890; Folio: 112; Page: 31; GSU roll: 823482.
- Probate Registry (1937). Pelham Horton Box: England & Wales, National Probate Calendar (Index of Wills and Administrations), 1858–1995. National Archives.
