= Alexander Craig =

Alexander Craig may refer to:

- Alexander Craig (poet) (1567?–1627), Scottish poet
- Alexander Kerr Craig (1828–1892), American politician
- Alexander J. Craig (1823–1870), American educator and politician from Wisconsin
- Alex Craig (footballer) (1886–?), Irish footballer
- Alex Craig (rugby union) (born 1998), Scottish rugby union player
- Alexander George Craig (1897–1973), author and poet
