= William McDougall (psychologist) =

British psychologist (1871–1938)

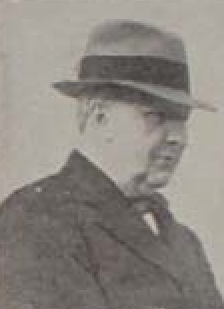
- William McDougall
- Born: 22 June 1871; Chadderton, Lancashire, England, United Kingdom of Great Britain and Ireland
- Died: 28 November 1938 (aged 67); Durham, North Carolina, United States
- Scientific career
- Fields: Psychology
- Doctoral advisor: W. H. R. Rivers

William McDougall FRS (/məkˈduːɡəl/ mək-DOO-gəl; 22 June 1871 – 28 November 1938) was an early 20th century psychologist who was a professor at University College London, University of Oxford, Harvard University and Duke University. He wrote a number of influential textbooks, and was important in the development of the theory of instinct and of social psychology in the English-speaking world.

McDougall was an opponent of behaviourism and stands somewhat outside the mainstream of the development of Anglo-American psychological thought in the first half of the 20th century; but his work was known and respected among lay people.

== Biography ==
He was born at Tonge, Middleton in the Manchester area on 22 June 1871, the second son of Isaac Shimwell McDougall and his wife Rebekah Smalley. His father was one of the McDougall brothers who developed self-raising flour, but concentrated on his own business as a chemical manufacturer.

McDougall was educated at a number of schools, and was a student at Owens College, Manchester and St John's College, Cambridge. He studied medicine and physiology in London and Göttingen. After teaching at University College London and Oxford, he was recruited to occupy the William James chair of psychology at Harvard University in 1920, where he served as a professor of psychology from 1920 to 1927. He then moved to Duke University, where he established the Parapsychology Laboratory under J. B. Rhine, and where he remained until his death. He was a Fellow of the Royal Society. Among his students were Cyril Burt, May Smith, William Brown and John Flügel.

== Views ==
McDougall's interests and sympathies were broad. He was interested in eugenics, but departed from neo-Darwinian orthodoxy in maintaining the possibility of the inheritance of acquired characteristics, as suggested by Jean-Baptiste Lamarck; he carried out many experiments designed to demonstrate this process.

Opposing behaviourism, McDougall argued that behaviour was generally goal-oriented and purposive, an approach he called hormic psychology. The term "hormic" comes from hormḗ (ὁρμή), the Greek word for "impulse" and according to Hilgard (1987) was drawn from the work of T. P. Nunn, a British colleague (Larson, 2014). He first outlined hormic psychology in An Introduction to Social Psychology (1908). Hormic psychology serves as one of the foundational frameworks for understanding the wide range of human motivational forces. He listed the following innate principal instincts and primary emotions that are "probably common to the men of every race and of every age":

- Flight (Fear)
- Repulsion (Disgust)
- Curiosity (Wonder)
- Pugnacity (Anger)
- Self-assertion (Elation)
- Self-abasement (Subjection)
- Parental Instinct (Tender)
- Reproduction
- Feeding
- Gregarious Instinct
- Acquisition
- Construction
- Crawling and Walking

However, in the theory of motivation, he defended the idea that individuals are motivated by a significant number of inherited instincts, whose action they may not consciously understand, so they might not always understand their own goals. His ideas on instinct strongly influenced Konrad Lorenz, though Lorenz did not always acknowledge this. McDougall underwent psychoanalysis with C. G. Jung, and was also prepared to study parapsychology.

Because of his interest in eugenics and his unorthodox stance on evolution, McDougall has been adopted as an iconic figure by proponents of a strong influence of inherited traits on behavior, some of whom are regarded by most mainstream psychologists as scientific racists. He wrote:

... the few distinguished Negroes, so called, of America – such as Douglass, Booker Washington, Du Bois – have been, I believe, in all cases mulattoes or had some proportion of white blood. We may fairly ascribe the incapacity of the Negro race to form a nation to the lack of men endowed with the qualities of great leaders, even more than to the lower level of average capacity.

McDougall married at the age of 29 ("against my considered principles", he reports in his autobiographical essay, "for I held that a man whose chosen business in life was to develop to the utmost his intellectual powers should not marry before forty, if at all"). He had five children.

McDougall's book The Group Mind received "very hostile reviews" from psychologists but sold well to the public. The American Press was critical of McDougall as his lectures on national eugenics were seen as racist.

== Psychical research ==
McDougall was a strong advocate of the scientific method and academic professionalisation in psychical research. He was instrumental in establishing parapsychology as a university discipline in the US in the early 1930s.

The traditional historiography of psychical research, dominated by the 'winners' of the race for 'the science of the soul', reveals fascinating epistemological incommensurabilities and a complex set of interplays between scientific and metaphysical presuppositions in the making and keeping alive of the scientific status of psychology. Thus, revised histories of psychical research and its relationship to psychology with a critical thrust not limited to that which has been viewed with suspicion anyway, offer both a challenge and a promise to historians, the discussion of which the present article hopes to stimulate.

In 1920, McDougall served as president of the Society for Psychical Research, and in the subsequent year of its US counterpart, the American Society for Psychical Research.

McDougall worked to enlist a number of scientific, religious, ethical, political and philosophical issues and causes into a wide "actor-network" which finally pushed through the institutionalization and professionalization of parapsychology. He was also a member of the Scientific American committee that investigated the medium Mina Crandon. He attended séances with the medium and was sceptical about her "ectoplasmic hand". He suspected that it was part of an animal, artificially manipulated to resemble a hand. McDougall's suspicion was confirmed by independent experts who had examined photographs of the hand.

McDougall was critical of spiritualism. He believed that some of its proponents such as Arthur Conan Doyle misunderstood psychical research and "devote themselves to propaganda". In 1926, McDougall concluded "I have taken part in a considerable number of investigations of alleged supernormal phenomena; but hitherto have failed to find convincing evidence in any case, but have found rather much evidence of fraud and trickery."

McDougall, however, continued to encourage scientific research on psychic phenomena and in 1937 was a founding co-editor (with Joseph Banks Rhine) of the peer-reviewed Journal of Parapsychology, which continues to be published. Because he was the first to formulate a theory of human instinctual behavior, he influenced the development of the new field of social psychology.

== Animism ==
In 1911, McDougall authored Body and Mind: A History and Defence of Animism. In the work he rejected both materialism and Darwinism and supported a form of Lamarckism where mind guides evolution. McDougall defended a form of animism where all matter has a mental aspect; his views were very similar to panpsychism as he believed that there was an animating principle in matter and had claimed in his work that there were both psychological and biological evidence for this position. McDougall had defended the theory that mind and the brain are distinct but interact with each other though he was not a dualist or a monist as he believed his theory of animism would replace both the philosophical views of dualism and monism. As a parapsychologist he also claimed telepathy had been scientifically proven. He used evidence from psychic research as well as from biology and psychology to defend his theory of animism.

McDougall produced another work attacking materialism titled Materialism and Emergent Evolution (1929). Materialism and Emergent Evolution (1929) was the only distinctive psychological approach to the field other than Floyd Allport's book titled Social Psychology, written in 1924. In the book he had also criticised the theory of emergent evolution as he claimed it had ignored the evidence of Lamarckism and had ignored the evidence of mind guiding evolution. McDougall's last work on the subject titled The Riddle of Life (1938) criticised organicism as according to McDougall even though the theory of organicism had rejected materialism it had not gone far enough in advocating an active role for a nonphysical principle.

== Selected bibliography ==
By William McDougall:

- Physiological Psychology (1905)
- An Introduction to Social Psychology. Methuen & Co, p. x, 355 (London 1908). A second edition appeared in 1909.

This book has been reprinted several times. For example, in 1960, University Paperbacks, an imprint of Methuen & Co and Barnes & Noble, published a reprint of the 23rd edition.

- Body and Mind: A History and a Defense of Animism (1911)
- The Group Mind: A Sketch of the Principles of Collective Psychology with Some Attempt to Apply Them to the Interpretation of National Life and Character (1920, reprinted 1973)
- Is America Safe for Democracy? Six Lectures Given at the Lowell Institute of Boston, Under the Title Anthropology and History, or the Influence of Constitution on the Destinies of Nations (1921)
- Outline of Psychology (1923)
- An Outline of Abnormal Psychology (1926)
- Character and the Conduct of Life (1927)
- Modern Materialism and Emergent Evolution (1929)
- Energies of Men (1932)
- The Riddle of Life (1938)

By Margaret Boden:

- Purposive Explanation in Psychology (1972)

== See also ==
- Crowd psychology
- Group dynamics
- Social psychology
- Inheritance of acquired characteristics
