= John C. Raven =

English psychometrician and psychologist (1902-1970)

John Carlyle Raven
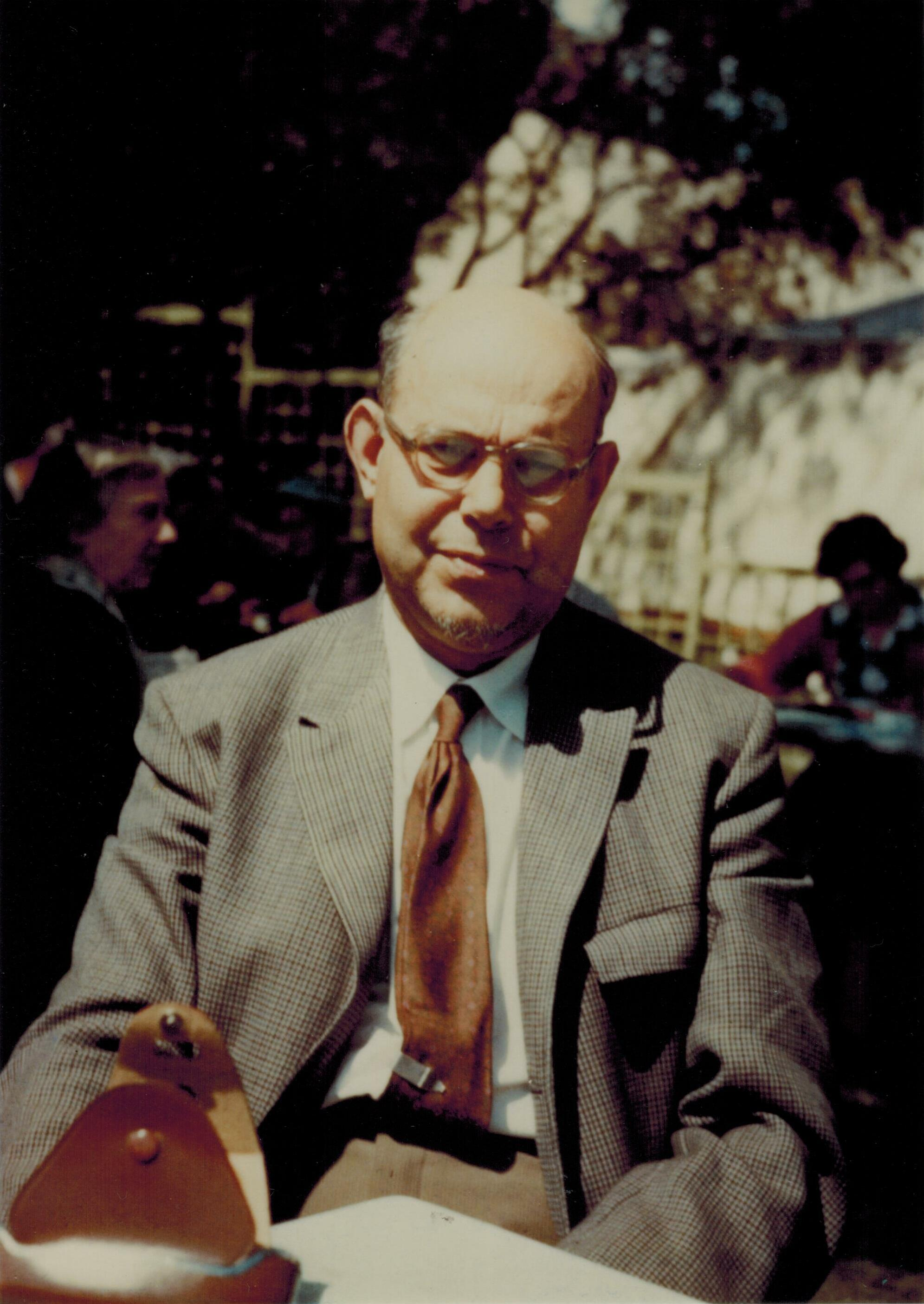
- photograph of John C. Raven
- Born: 28 June 1902; London, England
- Died: 10 August 1970 (aged 68); Dumfries, Scotland
- Citizenship: British
- Education: University of London
- Known for: Raven's Progressive Matrices
- Scientific career
- Fields: Psychology, psychometrics
- Workplaces: Crichton Royal Hospital Dumfries
- Thesis: Mental tests used in genetic studies (MSc) (1936)

John Carlyle Raven (28 June 1902 – 10 August 1970) was an English psychologist known for his contributions to psychometrics.

== Biography ==
John Carlyle Raven was born in London on 28 June 1902. His interest in psychology developed at an early age. Despite problems posed by the early death of his father—leaving him with a mother and two sisters to care for, and discouragement from his school teachers on account of his dyslexia—he insisted on pursuing these interests.

To support his studies he worked as a teacher, and then as the head teacher, in a boarding school for children with physical disabilities.

Based on archival material held by Pearson PLC in London, his interests were in topics that many would today regard as peripheral, such as the psychology of religion and its spiritual/parapsychological components. Detailed notes he took on his undergraduate laboratory work are preserved.

Both his undergraduate and postgraduate studies were formally under the direction of Francis Aveling at King's College London, but it would appear that, certainly as a post-graduate he had little direct contact with him, his MSc dissertation being based on work carried out at the Royal Eastern Counties Institution.

As an undergraduate, he became friendly with Charles Spearman and that, shortly after graduation, this relationship led to an introduction to Lionel Penrose who needed an assistant. Penrose was a geneticist conducting an investigation of the genetic and environmental origins of mental deficiency. This involved administering the Stanford–Binet Intelligence Scales tests to all parents and siblings of children identified as "mentally deficient" by the school system in East Anglia. Around this time, he met his wife, Mary Elizabeth Wild, who became a crucial assistant throughout his life.

Raven retired in May 1964.

John and Jean Raven have offered a more detailed account of Raven's life, work, and legacy.

== Research and theory ==
Raven found the tests cumbersome to administer in homes, schools, and workplaces (where, as he commented, there were friends and parents anxious to assist, no separate facilities for testing, and often a great deal of noise) and the results impossible to interpret because so many different things were composited together.

As a student of Spearman's, he concluded that what was needed was a test that was theoretically based (cf. Spearman's critique of the Terman-Merrill and Moray House Tests mentioned in the Wikipedia Charles Spearman entry) and easy to administer and score.

Accordingly, he set about developing tests of the two components of g identified by Spearman – namely eductive (meaning making) and reproductive ability. The former was measured by the Raven's Progressive Matrices (RPM) tests and the latter by a vocabulary test which later became known as the Mill Hill Vocabulary Test (MHV). The development of the RPM is described in his Master's dissertation. Significantly, this does not mainly consist of the kind of literature review one would normally expect but a specification of the operational criteria to be met by the, as yet non-existent, test. He and his wife, with the support of a grant from the Darwin Trust, then set about developing a test to meet these requirements.

It would appear that Raven was one of the few people (another was Louis Guttman) who appreciated the importance of developing tests which yielded something approaching an interval scale (although that term was not the stated objective of either author). Among other things, this meant that the sequence of item difficulties must be the same for persons of all levels of ability. In order to demonstrate this ... and identify those items which needed to be modified or rejected ... Raven plotted what have since become known in Item Response Theory terminology as Item Characteristic Curves. (When Georg Rasch appeared on the scene in the late 1950s and developed a mathematical model for doing this he tested it on the RPM and was satisfied when it worked!)

The first versions of what were later termed the Colored Progressive Matrices (CPM) (designed to spread the scores of the less able) and the Standard Progressive Matrices (SPM) were published in 1938.

The SPM came into its own with the advent of the Second World War. High levels of illiteracy and huge numbers to be tested rendered the use of most other tests unfeasible. After some validation exercises had been conducted, a special 20-minute version of the SPM was produced for the military. This had the items arranged in a single order of difficulty instead of the usual cyclical presentation. The absence of any dependence on language facilitated the diffusion of the tests into military systems throughout the world. (One sees the same requirement for language independence in such places as the mines of South Africa today. Again, there are many prospective entrants speaking many languages – all differing from that of the test administrator – and the question of whether the test has the same meaning in these different groups becomes serious.)

Although no further experimental work was pursued with a view to implementing Spearman's injunction to better understand the nature of eductive ability, the Ravens continued to reiterate that the eductive or meaning making ability measured by the RPM tests is a difficult and demanding activity primarily dependent on its affective and conative components and incorporating a great deal of unconscious activity of the kind that later became known as metacognitive activity. Consequently, it is not possible to generate the understanding Spearman sought via reductionist studies of the kind brought together in Carroll's book.

Despite undertaking no further empirical work on the nature of education, J. C. Raven did try to extend thinking in the area by developing a theoretical framework which he called the Principles of Individuation and Coordinates of Conduct. This he regarded as his most important contribution to psychology.

Alongside this, he did undertake further work with the Vocabulary tests (i.e. a measure of reproductive ability) which he came to see as a route into study of the workings of the mind.

The Ravens actively followed up Spearman's injunction to promote what amounts to a paradigm shift in psychological assessment by promoting procedures which would identify peoples' idiosyncratic motives or values and the components of competence required to pursue them. In this connection, J. C. Raven published his Controlled Projection while John Raven (jnr) published extensively *,*, but most succinctly and comprehensively in Competence in Modern Society. This work was built on a framework developed for scoring projective tests developed by David C. McClelland and his co-workers.

After working on various research grants, he was, in 1944, offered a post as Director of Psychological Research at the Crichton Royal (mental) Hospital in Dumfries, Scotland. Two things were remarkable about the terms of reference Raven negotiated for this appointment: First that it should be a part-time one so that he could focus on topics of his own choice without having to negotiate institutional approval. Second, the terms of reference for the department were that it should largely focus on studies of the normal in order that these might throw light on the abnormal.

Throughout his time in this position Raven resisted the notion that psychologists should be engaged in therapy, arguing that such a role relationship implicitly assumes that the therapist knows better than the patient what the patient should be doing. This, Raven argued, discouraged understanding. He maintained that the best way to promote personal re-organisation and growth involved helping people to understand themselves.

Other members of the department at the Crichton Royal included John Court, Alan Forbes, Graham Foulds, Ralph Hetherington, Joseph Kelly, John Orme, Nancy Thomson, Alastair Weir, and Eunice White.

== Later research with the RPM ==
Raven's work with the RPM and MHV has been continued by John Raven, jnr., with the help of dozens of international collaborators.

Much of this work relates directly to Raven's original objective in developing his tests, namely to facilitate studies into the genetic and environmental origins of human abilities. Most of the data from many of these studies were originally published in the Manual but later summarised in journals.

However, two strands of work merit special mention.

One line of research concerns Jim Flynn's work based on data collected from large-scale testing of military conscripts with the SPM in multiple countries across generations, reporting intergenerational increases in psychological test scores. The findings have been interpreted as suggesting an environmental contribution to these scores, although the causes of the increase remain uncertain. Analyses of cross-cultural data collected with the RPM have also suggested that a range of proposed explanations, including living conditions, television access, education, family size, diet, ethnicity, calligraphy, and test sophistication, may each account for only a limited part of the observed increase.

The other work meriting special mention is that conducted by the Minnesota Twin Family Study. This vindicated previous estimates of the heritability of many psychological characteristics – including such things as religiosity and the happiness set point as well as RPM scores. Newer studies show different heritability estimates, and there is still much debate as to the exact degree.

But the juxtaposition of these two great studies here underlines something which few have noted, but which Raven reiterated throughout his life namely that high heritability does not imply low mutability. (See Wikipedia entry Heritability of IQ.)
