= Godfrey Thomson =

British educational psychologist (1881–1955)

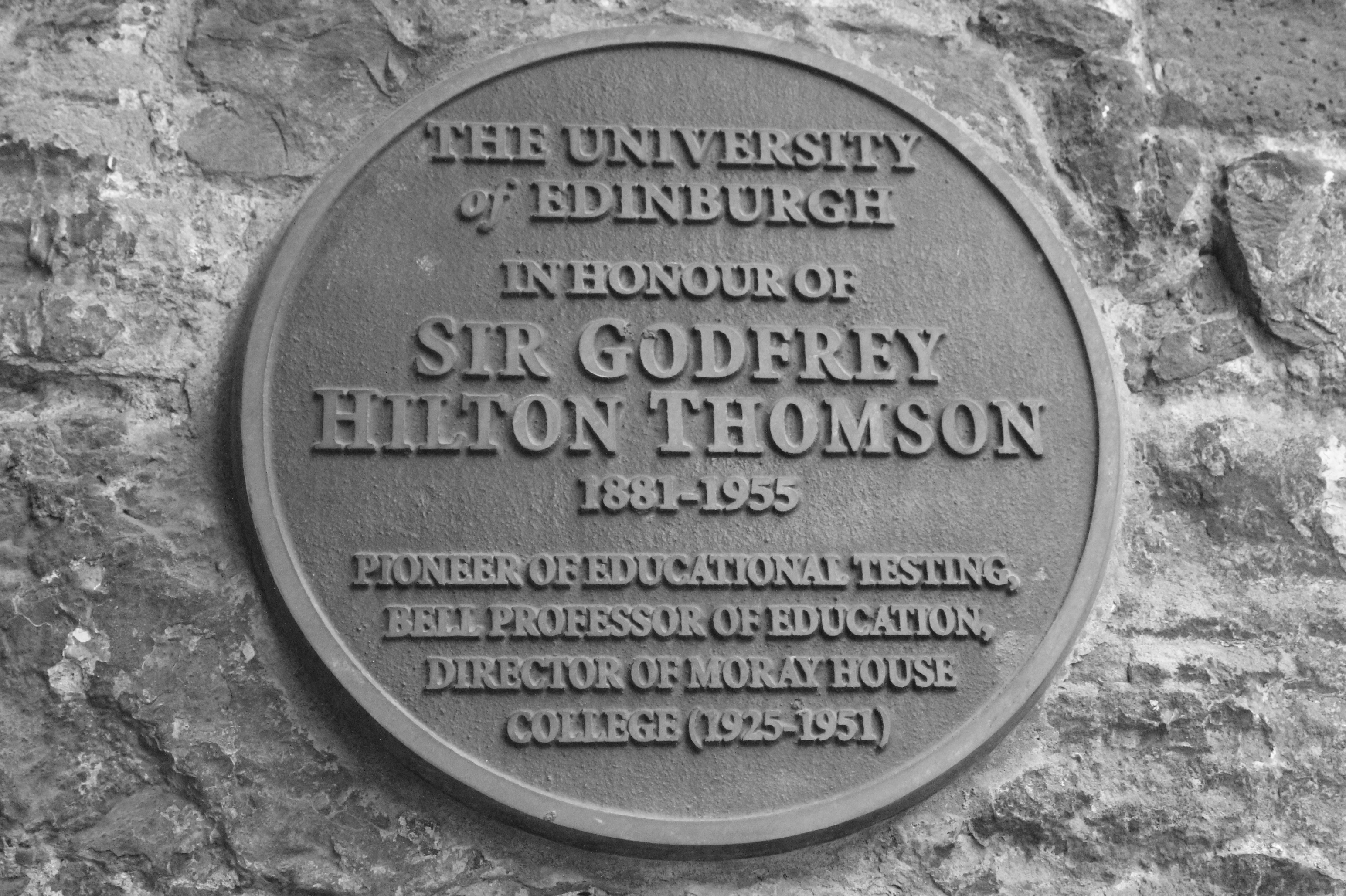
- Born: 27 March 1881; Carlisle
- Died: 9 February 1955 (aged 73); Edinburgh
- Spouse: Jane Hutchinson
- Children: Hector Thomson

Academic background
- Education: University of Strasbourg

Academic work
- Discipline: Psychology; Educational psychology
- Institutions: University of Durham; University of Edinburgh

Sir Godfrey Hilton Thomson FRSE DCL (27 March 1881 – 9 February 1955) was an English educational psychologist known as a critical pioneer in intelligence research.

The Godfrey Thomson Unit for Research at Moray College in Edinburgh is named in his honour.

== Life ==
Godfrey Thomson was born in Carlisle, Cumbria on 27 March 1881. He was the son of Charles Thomson and his wife, Jane Hilton. His parents separated when he was a young boy, and his mother moved the two of them to her native town of Felling located in Tyneside. It was here that he attended Felling High School. He was then awarded a scholarship to Rutherford College of Technology. He proceeded to study at Armstrong College in Newcastle and then moved on to study at the University of Strasbourg under Professor Ferdinand Braun, working on Hertzian waves.

He worked at Armstrong College, Newcastle upon Tyne (a college of the University of Durham, England) from 1906 to 1925, before moving to the University of Edinburgh from 1925 until 1951. It was here that he was the Bell Professor of Education and Director of the Moray House Teacher Training College.

His research began in psychophysics, but he became best known for his criticism of Spearman's general factor in intelligence. Pursuing this interest led to a major work on factor analysis of mental ability.

Additionally, Thomson was active in work on the relationship between fertility and intelligence, conducting some of the first nationally representative sample research, which concluded that this relationship was negative.

In 1926 he was elected a Fellow of the Royal Society of Edinburgh. His proposers were Ralph Allan Sampson, Alexander Morgan, Sir Edmund Taylor Whittaker and Norman Kemp Smith. He served as the Society's vice president from 1954 to 1955.

In 1931 he was responsible for organizing and analyzing the Scottish Mental Survey: Scotland's contribution to a European assessment of comparison between different countries in school examinations and their values.

Thomson was president of the British Psychological Society from 1945 to 1946.

He was knighted by King George VI in 1949.

He lived his later years at 5 Ravelston Dykes in western Edinburgh.

== Publications ==
- (with William Brown) The Essentials of Mental Measurement (1921)
- Instinct, Intelligence and Character (1924)
- A Modern Philosophy of Education (1929)

== Personal life ==
In 1912, he married Jane ("Jennie") Hutchinson (later Lady Jane Thomson), who was a fellow lecturer at the Armstrong College. They had one son, the diplomat Hector Thomson (1917-2008).

Local authority accommodation named after him in his mother's home town of Felling, Gateshead named, Sir Godfrey Thompson Court. Now demolished.
