= Raven's Progressive Matrices =

Non-verbal test

The cover of a test booklet for Raven's Standard Progressive Matrices

Raven's Progressive Matrices (often referred to simply as Raven's Matrices) or RPM is a non-verbal test typically used to measure general human intelligence and abstract reasoning and is regarded as a non-verbal estimate of fluid intelligence. It is one of the most common tests administered to both groups and individuals ranging from five-year-olds to the elderly. It comprises 60 multiple choice questions, listed in order of increasing difficulty. This format is designed to measure the test taker's reasoning ability, the eductive ("meaning-making") component of Charles Spearman's g (g is often referred to as general intelligence).

The tests were originally developed by John C. Raven and Lionel Penrose in 1936. In each test item, the subject is asked to identify the missing element that completes a pattern. Many patterns are presented in the form of a 6×6, 4×4, 3×3, or 2×2 matrix, giving the test its name.

== Problem structure ==
An IQ test item in the style of a Raven's Progressive Matrices test. Given eight patterns, the subject must identify the missing ninth pattern.

The questions consist of visual geometric design with a missing piece, with six to eight choices that fill in the piece.

Raven's Progressive Matrices and Vocabulary tests were originally developed for use in research into the genetic and environmental origins of cognitive ability. Raven thought that the tests commonly in use at that time were cumbersome to administer and the results difficult to interpret. Accordingly, he set about developing simple measures of the two main components of Spearman's g: the ability to think clearly and make sense of complexity (known as eductive ability) and the ability to store and reproduce information (known as reproductive ability).

Raven's tests of both were developed with the aid of what later became known as item response theory.

Raven first published his Progressive Matrices in the United Kingdom in 1938. His three sons established Scotland-based test publisher J C Raven Ltd. in 1972. In 2004, Harcourt Assessment, Inc. a division of Harcourt Education, acquired J C Raven Ltd. Harcourt was later acquired by Pearson PLC.

== Versions ==
The Matrices are available in three different forms for participants of different ability:

- Standard Progressive Matrices (RSPM): These were the original form of the matrices, first published in 1938. The booklet comprises five sets (A to E) of 12 items each (e.g., A1 through A12), with items within a set becoming increasingly complex, requiring ever greater cognitive capacity to encode and analyze information. All items are presented in black ink on a white background.
- Colored Progressive Matrices (RCPM): Designed for children aged five through eleven years of age, the elderly, and mentally and physically impaired individuals. This test contains sets A and B from the standard matrices, with a further set of 12 items inserted between the two, as set Ab. Most items are presented on a coloured background to make the test visually stimulating for participants. However, the last few items in set B are presented as black-on-white; in this way, if a subject exceeds the tester's expectations, transition to sets C, D, and E of the standard matrices is eased.
- Advanced Progressive Matrices (RAPM): The advanced form of the matrices contains 48 items, presented as one set of 12 (set I) and another of 36 (set II). Items are again presented in black ink on a white background, and become increasingly complex as progress is made through each set. These items are appropriate for adults and adolescents of above-average intelligence.

In addition, "parallel" forms of the standard and coloured progressive matrices were published in 1998. This was to address the problem of the Raven's Matrices being too well known in the general population. Items in the parallel tests have been constructed so that average solution rates to each question are identical for the classic and parallel versions. A revised version of the RSPM—the Standard Progressive Matrices Plus – was published at the same time. This was based on the "parallel" version but, although the test was the same length, it had more difficult items in order to restore the test's ability to differentiate among more able adolescents and young adults that the original RSPM had when it was first published. This new test, developed with the aid of better sampling arrangements and developments in the procedures available to implement the item response theory, has turned out to have exemplary test properties.

== Uses ==
The tests were initially developed for research purposes. Because of their independence of language and reading and writing skills, and the simplicity of their use and interpretation, they quickly found widespread practical application. For example, all entrants to the British armed forces from 1942 onwards took a 20-minute version of the RSPM, and potential officers took a specially adapted version as part of British War Office Selection Boards. The routine administration of what became the Standard Progressive Matrices to all entrants (conscripts) to many military services throughout the world (including the Soviet Union) continued at least until the present century. It was by bringing together these data that James R. Flynn was able to place the intergenerational increase in scores beyond reasonable doubt. Flynn's path-breaking publications on IQ gains around the world have led to the phenomenon of the gains being known as the Flynn effect. Among Robert L. Thorndike and other researchers who preceded Flynn in finding evidence of IQ score gains was John Raven, reporting on studies with the RPM.

A 2007 study provided evidence that individuals with Asperger syndrome, a high-functioning autism spectrum disorder, score higher than other individuals on Raven's tests. Another 2007 study found that individuals with classic low-functioning autism score higher on Raven's tests than on Wechsler tests. In addition, individuals with classic autism provided correct answers to the Raven's test in less time than individuals without autism, although they erred as often as the latter.

The high IQ societies International Society for Philosophical Enquiry (ISPE) and International High IQ Society accept the RAPM as a qualification for admission. The Triple Nine Society used to accept the Advanced Progressive Matrices as one of their admission tests. They still accept a raw score of at least 35 out of 36 on Set II of the RAPM if scored before April 2014.

== See also ==
- Naglieri Nonverbal Ability Test – Cognitive test
- Spatial ability – Capacity to understand 3D relationships
