= Alexander George Craig =

Alexander George Craig (known as Alec Craig; 1897–1973) was a British writer and poet, who wrote extensively about banned books and against literary censorship. Craig was interested more generally in sexual behaviour and reform, and was also engaged with the socialist movement. He was involved with the Progressive League, reviewing books for their journal.

His papers are in the archives of Senate House Library.

== Publications ==
=== Books ===
- Banned Books of England 1937
- Above All Liberties 1942
- Sex and Revolution 1934
- Memoranda of evidence submitted to the Select Committees of the House of Commons on obscene publications 1958
- Banned Books of England and Other Countries. A study of the conception of literary obscenity 1962
- Suppressed books 1963

=== Articles ===
- Outline of a Baudelaire bibliography 1945
- Recent developments in the Law of Obscene Libel in England 1952
- Bibliography of nudism 1954

=== Poetry ===
- Aspirin Eaters 1943
- Voice of Merlin 1946
- Prometheans 1955
