= William Brown (psychologist) =

British psychologist and psychiatrist

William Brown FRCP (5 December 1881 – 17 May 1952) was a British psychologist and psychiatrist. He was President of the British Psychological Society, 1951–52; Wilde Reader in Mental Philosophy at the University of Oxford, 1921–46; Director of the Institute of Experimental Psychology, University of Oxford, 1936–45. Brown’s writings reflect how his interests changed in the course of his career: from studying psychology from a statistical viewpoint, to practising psychiatry and finally to reflecting on big issues such as religion and war and the foundations of his disciplines.

== Biography ==
Brown was born in Slinfold, Sussex. He studied mathematics and philosophy at Christ Church, Oxford. In 1910 he was awarded a London University DSc for his thesis “The Use of the Theory of Correlation in Psychology” which applied statistical methods devised by Karl Pearson; the thesis provided the nucleus for his book The Essentials of Mental Measurement. Brown undertook medical training at King's College London and graduated MBBCh in Oxford in 1914. In WW1 he served in the Royal Army Medical Corps, working as a neurologist with shell shock victims, initially in France and then as commandant of the Craiglockhart Hospital for Neurasthenic Officers. He returned to his post of Reader in psychology at King's College London meanwhile continuing to acquire medical qualifications: he earned a DM in 1918, MRCP in 1921 and was elected FRCP in 1930. In 1921 Brown succeeded his teacher William McDougall as Wilde reader in mental philosophy. He remained in Oxford until his retirement in 1946: in 1936 he became the director of the Institute of Experimental Psychology at Oxford University.

Brown was a Christian and had a lifelong interest in parapsychology. He served on the board of the Society for Psychical Research 1923-1940. Brown was associated with Harry Price and his National Laboratory of Psychical Research. He attended séances with the medium Helen Duncan at the laboratory and concluded she was fraudulent.

== Publications ==
- Personality and Religion (1946)
- War and the Psychological Conditions of Peace (1942)
- Psychological Methods of Healing; An Introduction to Psychotherapy (1938)
- Mind, Medicine and Metaphysics: The Philosophy of a Physician (1936)
- Science and Personality (1929)
- Mind and Personality: An Essay in Psychology and Philosophy (1926)
- Suggestion and Mental Analysis: An Outline of the Theory and Practice of Mind Cure (1922)
- The Essentials of Mental Measurement (1911) Godfrey Thomson was co-author of later editions.
- William Brown, 'The psychologist in war-time', Lancet (1939), 1: 1288.
- William Brown, 'The treatment of cases of shell shock in an advanced neurological centre', Lancet (1918), 2: 197.
- William Brown, 'War neuroses', Lancet (1919), 2: 833.
