= J. C. Flügel =

British psychologist and psychoanalyst (1884–1955)

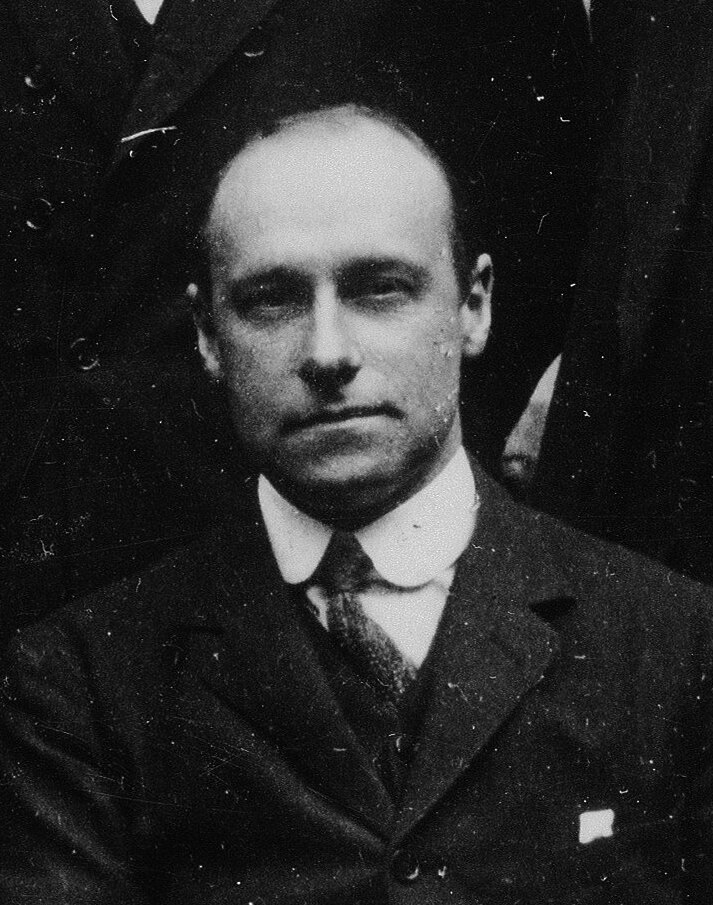
J. C. Flügel in 1920

John Carl Flugel (born John Carl Flügel; 13 June 1884 – 6 August 1955) was a British experimental psychologist and a practising psychoanalyst.

== Early life ==
Flügel was born in Liverpool on 13 June 1884, to a German father and English mother.

== Work ==
Flügel's book Psychoanalytic Study of the Family (1921) was acclaimed by Eric Berne for its insights into the Oedipus complex. He also published Men and their Motives (1934) and The Psychology of Clothes (1930), the latter continuing to influence thinking on the subject into the 21st century.

In Man, Morals and Society (1945), Flugel charted a movement from egocentrism to social awareness by way of what he saw as a hierarchy of expanding loyalties. Reaching back to his old mentor, he also highlighted “the distinction that McDougall has sometimes made between an 'ideal', which is little more than an intellectual assent to a moral proposition, and a 'sentiment', which involves a real mobilisation”.

He coined the phrase "Great Male Renunciation" (French: Grande Renonciation masculine) in 1930, referring to the historical phenomenon at the end of the 18th century in which wealthy Western men stopped using bright colors, elaborate shapes and variety in their dress, which were left to women's clothing. Instead, men concentrated on minute differences of cut, and the quality of the plain cloth. It is considered a major turning point in the history of clothing, in which the men relinquished their claim to adornment and beauty.

== Personal life ==
In 1913 Flügel married Ingeborg Klingberg, who also became a psychoanalyst. They had one daughter. Flügel died in London in 1955.
