= ABN =

ABN or abn may refer to:

== Companies ==
- ABN AMRO Group, a Dutch bank group
- ABN AMRO, sometimes referred to as "ABN" in shorthand, is a Dutch state-owned bank
- Algemene Bank Nederland, a now-defunct Dutch bank

== Radio, news and television organizations ==
- ABN Andhra Jyothi, a Telugu language news channel based in India
- Agri Broadcast Network, an Ohio-based agricultural radio news network
- ABN (TV station), the Australian Broadcasting Corporation's Sydney TV station
- ABNXcess, the sole cable television operator in Malaysia
- Asahi Broadcasting Nagano, a television station in Nagano Prefecture, Japan
- Asia Business News, a defunct business news channel
- Agencia Bolivariana de Noticias, the national news agency of Venezuela
- Avivamiento Broadcasting Network, a religious local TV station in Bogotá, Colombia
- AMCARA Broadcasting Network, a Philippine-based broadcast company in Quezon City, Philippines
- African Broadcast Network, a defunct African television network

== Other organizations ==
- Alaska Board of Nursing, the regional board of nurses in the state of Alaska, US
- American Board of Professional Neuropsychology
- Anti-Bolshevik Bloc of Nations, an anti-Soviet Cold War group
- Aramaic Broadcast Network, part of the Tri-State Christian Television for some years
- Australian Bibliographic Network, former name of the Australian National Bibliographic Database, a shared library catalogue and service
- Niger Basin Authority (from its French name Authorité du Bassin du Niger), an intergovernmental organisation in West Africa

== Transport infrastructure ==
- Absecon station, Amtrak station code ABN
- Albina Airstrip in Marowijne District, Suriname (IATA airport code ABN)
- Akabane Station (JR East station code), in Kita, Tokyo, Japan

== Other uses ==
- ABN (hip hop duo), or Assholes by Nature, rappers Trae and Z-Ro; also their 2003 album Assholes by Nature
- Abua language, a Central Delta language of Nigeria
- Australian Business Number, a unique identifier issued to business entities by the Australian Taxation Office
- Algemeen Beschaafd Nederlands (Common Civilized Dutch), the near-obsolete name for now "Common Dutch"
