= Human Cognitive Abilities =

Book about human intelligence measurement

Human Cognitive Abilities: A Survey of Factor-Analytic Studies
- Author: John B. Carroll
- Subject: Psychometrics
- Published: 1993
- Publisher: Cambridge University Press
- ISBN: 0-521-38712-4

Human Cognitive Abilities: A Survey of Factor-Analytic Studies is a 1993 book by psychologist John B. Carroll. It provides an overview of psychometric research using factor analysis to study human intelligence. It has proven highly influential in subsequent intelligence research; in 2009, Kevin McGrew described it as a "seminal treatise". The majority of datasets analyzed in the book were later compiled and made freely available on the Woodcock-Muñoz Foundation Human Cognitive Abilities online archive.

== Content ==
Human Cognitive Abilities is divided into three parts: an introductory background section, a section discussing the different domains of cognitive ability, and a section discussing more general issues related to the study of such abilities, such as the three-stratum theory.

== Reviews ==
Douglas A. Bors reviewed the book favorably in the Canadian Journal of Experimental Psychology, concluding that "It undoubtedly is a book that anyone interested in cognitive abilities would wish to explore because of its encyclopedic, in-depth coverage of the topic." In the journal Gifted Child Quarterly, Michael C. Pyryt of the University of Calgary described the book as "...a remarkable achievement that should be of interest to everyone in gifted education" and "an important contribution to the field of individual differences." Neville A. Stanton stated that "The work presented...appears to be as exhaustive as it is comprehensive." In another favorable review, Timothy Z. Keith predicted that the book "...will become a sourcebook for researchers and an invaluable resource for others interested in human cognitive abilities." Robert B. Burns of the University of California, Riverside praised it as "truly a remarkable book" and as "simply the finest work of research and scholarship I have read". Professor Jordan B Peterson stated in a similar manner that "...this is a book that everyone who is a psychologist [needs to read in order to be one]."

== Influence ==
According to Schneider & McGrew, Human Cognitive Abilities was the first ever book to present "an empirically based taxonomy of human cognitive abilities...in a single, coherent, organized, systematic framework". They also described Carroll's book as "a much-needed Rosetta stone" for future human intelligence researchers. Arthur Jensen referred to the book as Carroll's "crowning achievement" and "a truly monumental work. It was a fulfillment of something that most of us would agree needed to be done, but it seemed too vast an undertaking to imagine how it could ever be done effectively and adequately." In 1998, Carroll himself described the book's publication as "the most bracing event of my life" over the previous few years.
