= Woodcock (disambiguation) =

A Woodcock is one of seven very similar wading bird species in the genus Scolopax.

Woodcock or Woodcocks may also refer to:

== Military ==
- HMS Woodcock (1806), a schooner of the Royal Navy
- HMS Woodcock (U90), a WWII-era Royal Navy sloop
- USS Woodcock (AM-14), a minesweeper of the US Navy
- Hawker Woodcock, a 1920s fighter of the Royal Air Force

== Places ==
- Woodcock, Pennsylvania, a borough in the United States
- Woodcock Township, Pennsylvania, United States
- Woodcocks, New Zealand, a rural locality in the Rodney District
- Woodcock Lake, a lake in Minnesota

== Other uses ==
- Woodcock Airport, near Woodcock, British Columbia
- Woodcock (apple), a variety of English cider apple first described in the 17th century
- Woodcock (surname), an English surname
- Mr. Woodcock, a 2007 American comedy film
- The psychological tests of the Dean–Woodcock Neuropsychological Assessment System or Woodcock–Johnson Tests of Cognitive Abilities
