= Richard Woodcock =

American psychometrician (1928–2024)

- Born: Richard Wesley Woodcock; January 29, 1928; Portland, Oregon, U.S.
- Died: January 2, 2024 (aged 95); San Diego, California, U.S.
- Education: University of Oregon
- Known for: Cattell–Horn–Carroll theory Development of cognitive tests
- Spouses: Annie Lee Plant (m. 1951–1991) Ana Felicia Muñoz-Sandoval (m. 1991)
- Children: 4
- Awards: Senior scientist award from Division 16 of the American Psychological Association (1993)
- Scientific career
- Fields: Psychology; Psychometrics; Statistics
- Institutions: Western Oregon University; University of Northern Colorado; George Peabody College for Teachers; University of Virginia; Texas Woman’s University
- Thesis: Construction and evaluation of a test for predicting success in remedial reading (1956)

Richard Wesley Woodcock (January 29, 1928 – January 2, 2024) was an American psychometrician. He is known for his work on the Cattell–Horn–Carroll theory of human intelligence and for his work in the development of several cognitive tests, including the Woodcock–Johnson Tests of Cognitive Abilities and the Dean–Woodcock Neuropsychological Assessment System. He is also credited with introducing the Rasch model into psychometric research. He was a fellow of the American Psychological Association and the American Academy of School Psychology, as well as a Diplomate of the American Board of Professional Psychology. In 1993, he received the Senior Scientist in School Psychology Award from Division 16 of the American Psychological Association. Two research institutes are named after him: the Woodcock Education Center at Western Oregon University, and the Woodcock Institute for Advancement of Neurocognitive Research and Applied Practice at Texas Woman's University, both of which opened in the fall of 2016. As of 2018, he lived in San Diego, California. Woodcock was born on January 29, 1928, and died on January 2, 2024, at the age of 95.
