= Raymond Dean =

American psychologist

Raymond S. Dean
- Born: September 24, 1946; Troy, New York, U.S.
- Died: July 6, 2015 (aged 68); Muncie, Indiana, U.S.
- Education: State University of New York at Albany; Arizona State University; University of Wisconsin–Madison
- Known for: Dean–Woodcock Neuropsychological Assessment System, founder of the Archives of Clinical Neuropsychology
- Scientific career
- Fields: Neuropsychology, Psychology
- Workplaces: University of Wisconsin–Madison; University of North Carolina at Chapel Hill; Washington University in St. Louis

Raymond S. Dean was an American psychologist and George and Frances Ball Distinguished Professor of Neuropsychology and Professor of Psychology at Ball State University.

== Early history ==
Dean received a B.A. (Magna cum laude) in Psychology and an M.S. in Psychological Research and Psychometrics from State University of New York at Albany. As a Paracheck-Frazier Research Fellow, Dean was awarded a Ph.D. in school/child clinical psychology in 1978 by Arizona State University. His neuropsychological internship was at the Arizona Neuropsychiatric Hospital and postdoctoral training at the University of Wisconsin–Madison. Since that time, he remained an active scholar in Neuropsychology and held faculty appointments at the University of Wisconsin–Madison, University of North Carolina at Chapel Hill, Washington University School of Medicine, Distinguished Visiting Faculty of the NIMH Staff College, and Ball State University. From 1985, Dean concluded that the utility of neuropsychological assessment as a tool in the diagnoses and localization of brain damage. He subsequently advocated for the need for specificity of functions measured by these tests (e.g. memory).

== 1980s ==
Since the 1980s, Dean maintained that, without a functional basis to test, the increase in scanning technology would result in decreased efficacy of neuropsychological assessment. His concerns were realized through the sophistication and geometric growth of radiological scanning techniques evidenced over the past 30 years. Prior to the early 1970s, skull x-rays were considered state of the art diagnostic tools. Advances in computer driven scanning devices, including computerized tomography and magnetic resonance imaging, produced microscopic views of central nervous system soft tissue that was not otherwise available.

Dean's work demonstrated the importance of neuropsychological examinations in the measurement of brain activity. These measures included information about brain functioning to inform assessment on rehabilitation approaches. The neuropsychological examination method enabled clinical definition and opinion on adaptive behavior in the context of a change in pathophysiology or processes, including brain damage. Despite more definitive knowledge concerning the anatomical integrity of the brain, individual differences of subjects limits specific prediction of behavioral, cognitive and emotional expression. For example, the effect of a brain lesion on brain functioning. Dean predicted that the future of neuropsychological assessment depends on the level of continuing interest and investment in the identification and treatment of behavioral deficits in the academic and clinical settings. Dean's work confronts that of Woodcock, and Cattell. This work also addressed the work of Horn (Gf-Gc theory), later known as the Cattell-Horn-Carroll Theory (CHC Theory), concerning an empirically derived theory of multiple cognitive abilities. The Dean–Woodcock Neuropsychological Model (DNM) integrated the CHC Information Processing Model and the foundations of neuropsychology measures. According to the DNM model, neuropsychological functioning represented an interaction of various cognitive, noncognitive, emotional and sensory motor functions. It followed, the Dean–Woodcock Neuropsychological Assessment Battery was based on the DNM which integrated information processing features basing neuropsychology assessment.

== Later work ==
During his career, Dean contributed to articles, books, and tests in the field of Neuropsychology. He co-authored the Dean–Woodcock Neuropsychological Assessment System (Dean & Woodcock, 2001) and the Dean–Woodcock Neuropsychological Sensory Motor Battery. He was appointed Affiliation, Membership and Fellowship with the American Psychological Association (Divisions: Clinical, Educational, School and Clinical Neuropsychology), the National Academy of Neuropsychology, and the American Psychopathological Association.

Dean held a Diploma from the American Board of Professional Psychology and the American Board of Professional Neuropsychology. He served as Director of the Neuropsychology Laboratory at Ball State University and Director of Neuropsychology at the Indiana Neuroscience Institute, St. Vincent Hospital and Health Care Center. He was the founder and editor-in-chief of both the Archives of Clinical Neuropsychology and the Bulletin of the National Academy of Neuropsychology. He served as editor-in-chief of the Journal of School Psychology and edited the Journal of Head Injury. He was recognized for his accomplishments by his peers including the Lightner Witmer Award (A.P.A., Div. 16), an Outstanding Contribution Award from the National Academy of Neuropsychology, the Richard E. Snow Research Award (APA, Div. 15), the National Academy of Neuropsychology, Journal of School Psychology, Clinical Neuropsychology Division of APA, the Lifetime Achievement Award in Neuropsychology (National Association of School Psychologists), and National Academy of Neuropsychology's President's Medal of Achievement. He also served as President of both the Clinical Neuropsychology Division of the APA and the National Academy of Neuropsychology.
