= Nelson–Denny Reading Test =

Non-clinical reading test used for students

The Nelson–Denny Reading Test was created in 1930 by Martin J. Nelson and Emerson Charles Denny, both of whom were on the faculty of Iowa State Teacher's College. The purpose of the test is to measure reading ability among high school and college students. It is not appropriate for the clinical evaluation of reading disorders, however it may be used to identify students in need of remedial reading instruction. The Nelson–Denny includes two subtests (Vocabulary and Comprehension) both with multiple choice questions, and yields four scores. The most recent revision was published in 1993 and is available from Riverside Publishing in Itasca, Illinois.

The Nelson–Denny can be administered in a group format. Total administration time is about 45 minutes which includes time spent instructing examinees.

The Nelson–Denny includes two subtests and yields four scores. The first subtest, Vocabulary, consists of 80 multiple-choice items, each with five response options. The words were drawn from high school and college textbooks and vary in difficulty. The second subtest, Comprehension, requires examinees to read five short passages (also drawn from high school and college textbooks) and to respond to 38 multiple-choice questions about the contents of these passages. Approximately half of these items relate to specific factual content, while the other half are more inferential in nature. A total reading score is derived by summing the Vocabulary score with the Comprehension score. (The latter score is doubled so as to compensate for the larger number of items on the first subtest.) Part way through the first passage in the Comprehension subtest, reading rate is also assessed.

The primary uses of the Nelson–Denny are as a screening test for reading problems, as a predictor of academic success, and as a measure of progress resulting from educational interventions. These functions overlap to some degree. The last-mentioned use is facilitated by the existence of two parallel forms of the Nelson–Denny (Form I and Form J). It is not appropriate for the clinical evaluation of reading disorders, however it may be used to identify students in need of remedial reading instruction.

The test has been revised and updated several times under the direction of James I. Brown of the University of Minnesota. The most recent revision was published in 2018. It is available from Riverside Publishing in Itasca, Illinois, Western Psychological Services (WPS), and Psychological Assessment Resources (PAR, Inc.).
