= Cross-battery assessment =

Cross-battery assessment (XBA) is the process by which psychologists use information from a number of test batteries (IQ tests) to help guide diagnostic decisions and to gain a fuller picture of an individual's cognitive abilities than can be ascertained through single-battery assessments. XBA was first introduced in the late 1990s by Dawn Flanagan, Samuel Ortiz and Kevin McGrew. It offers practitioners the means to make systematic, valid and up-to-date interpretations of intelligence batteries and to augment them with other tests in a way that is consistent with the Cattell–Horn–Carroll theory (CHC) of cognitive abilities.

== Sources of information ==
XBA is an efficient method of measuring a wider (or deeper and more selective) range of cognitive abilities and processes than a single intelligence battery can measure. It is based on three sources of information (practice, research and test development) that provide the knowledge necessary to organise theory-driven, comprehensive, reliable, and valid assessments of cognitive abilities.

=== Practice ===
R. W. Woodcock conducted a joint factor analysis suggesting the necessity of cross-battery assessments to measure a broad range of cognitive abilities, rather than a single intellectual battery. Woodcock found that of the major intellectual batteries used before 2000, most failed to measure three or more broad CHC abilities that were considered essential in understanding and predicting school achievement. This provided the impetus for developing XBA, which facilitates communication among professionals and guards against misinterpretation. It offers practitioners a psychometric way of identifying normative strengths and weaknesses in cognitive abilities.

=== Research ===
XBA helped to promote a greater understanding of the relationship between cognitive abilities and outcome criteria. Improving the validity of CHC will clarify the relationship between it and outcomes such as achievement and occupation.

=== Test development ===
Test authors have utilized CHC and XBA as a blueprint for development of tests such as the WJ III, SB5, KABC-II, and DAS-II. Despite the fact that cognitive-ability tests now have a greater coverage of CHC, XBA is still necessary.

== Implementation ==
It is recommended that practitioners adhere to several guiding principles to ensure that XBA procedures are psychometrically and theoretically sound. An intelligence battery should best address referral concerns. Sub-tests and clusters (or composites) of a single battery should be used whenever possible to best represent broad CHC abilities. CHC broad- and narrow-ability clusters should be constructed with methods such as CHC-driven factor analyses or expert-consensus content-validity studies. When two or more different indicators of broad abilities of interest are not assessed (or available) on the core battery, they may be supplemented by broad-ability indicators from another battery. Tests that were developed within a few years of each other should be selected. To minimize spurious differences between test scores, tests from the smallest number of batteries should be selected. Evaluation requires professional judgement and should include direct observations, including interviews with those who know the test subject. Sound decisions require an explanatory framework that is logical and consistent, with an explanation of conflicting data.

== SLD evaluation ==
Specific learning disability (SLD) is the largest disability identified among school-aged children. According to Flanagan, Ortiz and Alfonso, To receive a diagnosis of SLD the following criteria must be met: a deficit in academic functioning, academic difficulties are not due to exclusionary factors such as neurological issues, a deficit in cognitive ability is determined, exclusionary factors are reviewed to determine that they are not responsible for academic and cognitive deficits, underachievement is established, and the academic deficits have a negative effect on daily life.
