= Kevin McGrew =

American psychologist

- Born: Kevin Scott McGrew
- Citizenship: American
- Education: Minnesota State University Moorhead; University of Minnesota
- Known for: Research on human intelligence
- Children: 1 son, 1 daughter, 3 step sons
- Awards: Distinguished Alumni Award from the University of Minnesota College of Education and Human Development (2016)
- Scientific career
- Fields: Educational psychology Psychometrics
- Institutions: St. Cloud State University; Institute for Applied Psychometrics
- Thesis: Defining the constructs of adaptive and maladaptive behavior within a model of personal competence (1989)

Kevin S. McGrew is an American psychologist and intelligence researcher. He is the founder and director of the Institute for Applied Psychometrics, as well as a visiting professor of educational psychology at the University of Minnesota. He was formerly Professor of Applied Psychology at St. Cloud State University. He is a co-author of Batteries III and IV of the Woodcock–Johnson Tests of Cognitive Abilities. In 2016, he received the University of Minnesota College of Education and Human Development's Distinguished Alumni Award.
