= G-VPR model =

Psychological theory of cognitive skill

The g-VPR model is a model of human intelligence published in 2005 by psychology professors Wendy Johnson and Thomas J. Bouchard Jr. (Johnson & Bouchard, 2005) They developed the model by analyzing Gf-Gc theory, John Carroll’s Three-stratum theory and Vernon’s verbal-perceptual model.

The g-VPR model is a four stratum model:

1. First stratum: Primary traits.
2. Second stratum: Broader than stratum I, but still narrow abilities.
3. Third stratum: Verbal, perceptual and rotation factors.
4. Fourth stratum: g factor.

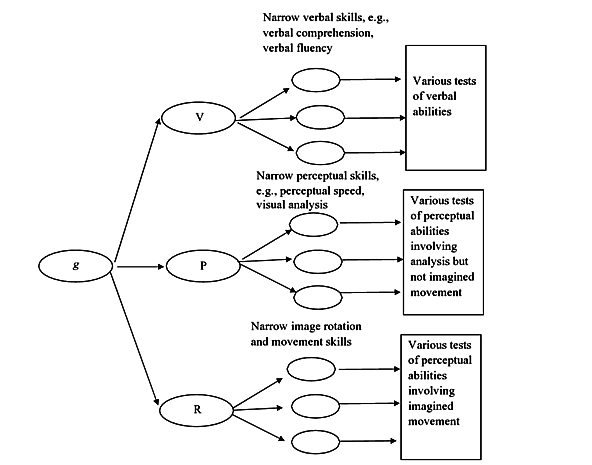
VPR model

== Why Johnson and Bouchard claim the g-VPR model is better ==
Johnson and Bouchard made comparisons between Gf-Gc, three-stratum and verbal-spatial model. They found that Vernon's verbal-perceptual model got better modeling-fit results than the other two, but still did not fit very well. Then, based on the verbal-spatial model, Johnson and Bouchard "began by adding a memory factor (labeled content memory to distinguish it from the memory factor in the fluid-crystallized model)". They also made some extra changes to improve model fit.

According to results from CAB (comprehensive ability battery), they added/moved loadings to adjust new model. Then it came into a new "visual-perceptual-memory" model.

However, Johnson and Bouchard found that "[i]solation of the tests involved resulted in identification of an additional third-stratum factor for image rotation, which also eliminated the contradictory cross-loadings." Therefore, finally, the new model was named as verbal-perceptual-rotation (VPR) model.

After Johnson and Bouchard concluded this g-VPR intelligence structure model, they compared the model fit of g-VPR with the Gf-Gc model and the verbal-spatial model. Results showed that the g-VPR model fitted better than any other models.

In the article, Johnson and Bouchard (2005) also discussed specifically about the g-VPR model and Gf-Gc theory. According to Garlick (2002), special neuronal connections will be built under environmental stimuli when people's knowledge and skills are developed. We may thus relate the Gf-Gc theory with forming neuronal connections. However, forming of the neuronal connections under environmental stimuli takes place individually; it is uncertain for a universal process.

"We can understand how intellectual performance emerges in the individual through the use of Gf–Gc theory, but understanding why intellectual performance takes the particular pattern it does requires comparison across individuals. The distinction between fluid and crystallized intelligence can only emerge to the extent that it is possible to develop a battery of tests that accurately distinguishes between material to which test takers should have been exposed and tasks that they should find novel." (Johnson & Bouchard, 2005)

Another problem is about the "Flynn effect" (Dickens & Flynn, 2002). Vocabulary performance (considered as crystallized intelligence) has smaller cohort effects than reasoning performance (considered as fluid intelligence). Both exposure to vocabulary task and reasoning task have been increased greatly in past decades. However, whatever there is a great increase in mental ability test score, the performance on fluid intelligence "may merely reflect greater development of related neuronal patterns."

The g-VPR model includes the idea that the left brain is related to verbal and logical process, and the right brain is related to non-verbal, spatial process (e.g., Gray, 1999; Hugdahl, 2000; Toga & Thompson, 2003) Under this framework, the results of factor analysis can gain a clear explanation.
