= COGAT =

The abbreviation COGAT or cogat (capitalization may vary) may refer to:

- Cognitive Abilities Test, an American student assessment test
- Coordinator of Government Activities in the Territories, an Israeli military office
