= Emerson Charles Denny =

American professor (1887–1984)

- Born: August 15, 1887; Madison, Indiana, US
- Died: January 12, 1984 (aged 96); Cedar Falls, Iowa, US
- Education: Marion Normal College; Indiana University Bloomington (BA); University of Chicago (AM); State University of Iowa (PhD)
- Occupation(s): Professor and test maker
- Notable work: Nelson–Denny Reading Test

Emerson Charles Denny (August 15, 1887 – January 12, 1984) was an American professor and test maker. He taught about mental testing and child psychology. Denny researched educational testing and measurement, leading him to co-publish the Denny–Nelson American History Test and the Nelson–Denny Reading Test. The tests gave Denny national recognition and are still used in a revised format. Parts of the Nelson–Denny Reading Test are held at the Smithsonian National Museum of Natural History.

== Personal life ==
Denny was born to John Johnson Denny and Effa Lauretta (Haines) in Madison, Indiana, on August 15, 1887. Denny attended Marion Normal College. In 1915, Denny earned his Bachelor of Arts degree from Indiana University Bloomington. He attended the University of Chicago, where he earned his Master of Arts degree in 1916. He was married on August 22, 1917, to Blanche Blackburn and they had one daughter and two sons. Denny graduated from the State University of Iowa with a PhD. in 1932. His Ph.D. dissertation detailed the issues that affect tests about American history. He was active in Cedar Falls, Iowa, as part of the American Legion, the Chamber of Commerce, and the Rotary Club. Denny died on January 12, 1984, in Cedar Falls, where he is buried at Fairview Cemetery.

== Career ==
From 1905 until 1914, Denny was a teacher and superintendent at Indiana schools in rural areas and towns. Denny became head of the Department of Education at the Normal School in Lewiston, Idaho, from 1916 until 1917. While part of the U.S. Army, Denny traveled to England, France, and Germany from 1917 until 1919. He was a private in the medical branch. After leaving the army, Denny started teaching mathematics at Wabash College from 1919 until 1920. He was a principal at a high school in Norfolk, Nebraska, from 1920 until 1922, later teaching education during the summer in 1920 and 1921. He then became the head of the English Department at a West Allis, Wisconsin, high school from 1922 until 1923. During the summer of 1923, Denny started working at the Iowa State Teachers College. As part of the staff at the college, Denny worked in the Department of Education as its head from 1934 until 1949. At some point, Denny worked at Berea College. He was part of the Phi Delta Kappa education honorary, the National Education Association, the Iowa State Education Association, and the National Council for the Social Studies. Denny began teaching part-time from 1955 until 1967 as an emeritus professor.

=== Contributions ===
As someone who taught about "mental testing" and child psychology, Denny researched "educational testing" and measurement. Denny and Martin J. Nelson, who also taught at the college, published the Denny–Nelson American History Test in 1929, which was meant for 7th and 8th grades. Denny and Nelson later worked on the Nelson–Denny Reading Test that was published in 1930. Over 30 years, Denny and Nelson continued the development and revisions of tests in multiple subjects for multiple "educational levels". The tests were revised by other people, including the Reading Test, and they are still used. Denny wrote articles about testing, statistics workbooks that were aimed at teachers, and many unpublished measurement studies. He co-founded the National Council on Measurement in Education and was its president from 1942 until 1946. The tests gave Denny national recognition. Parts of the Nelson–Denny Reading Test are held at the Smithsonian National Museum of Natural History, but it is not on public display.
