= Battelle Developmental Inventory =

Assessment of child development

The Battelle Developmental Inventory is a clinical-administered assessment that measures mastery of developmental milestones in the global domains of communication, social-emotional, adaptive, motor, and cognitive development. It is appropriate for use with children from birth to 7 years, 11 months. This assessment is published by Riverside Insights. As of 2020, the current edition is the 3rd edition.
