= Human intelligence =

Human capacity or ability to acquire, apprehend and apply knowledge

Human intelligence is the intellectual capability of humans, which is marked by complex cognitive feats and high levels of motivation and self-awareness. Using their intelligence, humans are able to learn, form concepts, understand, and apply logic and reason. Human intelligence is also thought to encompass their capacities to recognize patterns, plan, innovate, solve problems, make decisions, retain information, and use language to communicate.

There are conflicting ideas about how intelligence should be conceptualized and measured. In psychometrics, human intelligence is assessed by intelligence quotient (IQ) tests. Several subcategories of intelligence, such as emotional intelligence and social intelligence, have been proposed, and there remains significant debate as to whether these represent distinct forms of intelligence.

There is also ongoing debate regarding how an individual's level of intelligence is formed, ranging from the idea that intelligence is fixed at birth to the idea that it is malleable and can change depending on a person's mindset and efforts.

Psychologists such as Thomas Suddendorf argue we can learn about human intelligence by studying close relatives like primates.

== Correlates ==
As a construct and as measured by intelligence tests, intelligence is one of the most useful concepts in psychology, because it correlates with many relevant variables, for instance the probability of suffering an accident, or the amount of one's salary. Other examples include:

Education
According to a 2018 metastudy of educational effects on intelligence, education appears to be the "most consistent, robust, and durable method" known for raising intelligence.

Personality
A landmark set of meta-analyses synthesizing thousands of studies including millions of people from over 50 countries found that many personality traits are intricately related to cognitive abilities. Neuroticism-related traits display the most negative relations, whereas traits like activity, industriousness, compassion, and openness are positively related to various abilities.

Myopia
A number of studies have shown a correlation between IQ and myopia. Some suggest that the reason for the correlation is environmental: either people with a higher IQ are more likely to damage their eyesight with prolonged reading, or people who read more are more likely to attain a higher IQ; others contend that a genetic link exists.

Aging
There is evidence that aging causes a decline in cognitive functions. In one cross-sectional study, various cognitive functions measured declines by about 0.8 in z-score from age 20 to age 50; the cognitive functions included speed of processing, working memory, and long-term memory.

Genes
A number of single-nucleotide polymorphisms in human DNA are correlated with higher IQ scores.

== Theories ==
=== Relevance of IQ tests ===
In psychology, human intelligence is commonly assessed by IQ scores that are determined by IQ tests. In general, higher IQ scores are associated with better outcomes in life. However, while IQ test scores show a high degree of inter-test reliability, and predict certain forms of achievement effectively, their construct validity as a holistic measure of human intelligence is considered dubious. While IQ tests are generally understood to measure some forms of intelligence, they may fail to serve as an accurate measure of broader definitions of human intelligence inclusive of creativity and social intelligence. According to psychologist Wayne Weiten, "IQ tests are valid measures of the kind of intelligence necessary to do well in academic work. But if the purpose is to assess intelligence in a broader sense, the validity of IQ tests is questionable."

=== Theory of multiple intelligences ===
Howard Gardner's theory of multiple intelligences is based on studies of normal children and adults, of gifted individuals (including so-called "savants"), of persons who have suffered brain damage, of experts and virtuosos, and of individuals from diverse cultures. Gardner breaks intelligence down into components. In the first edition of his book Frames of Mind (1983), he described seven distinct types of intelligence: logical-mathematical, linguistic, spatial, musical, kinesthetic, interpersonal, and intrapersonal. In a second edition, he added two more types of intelligence: naturalist and existential intelligences. He argues that psychometric (IQ) tests address only linguistic and logical plus some aspects of spatial intelligence. A criticism of Gardner's theory is that it has never been tested, or subjected to peer review, by Gardner or anyone else, and indeed that it is unfalsifiable. Others (e.g. Locke, 2005) suggest that recognizing many specific forms of intelligence (specific aptitude theory) implies a political—rather than scientific—agenda, intended to appreciate the uniqueness in all individuals, rather than recognizing potentially true and meaningful differences in individual capacities. Schmidt and Hunter suggest that the predictive validity of specific aptitudes over and above that of general mental ability, or "g", has not received empirical support. On the other hand, Jerome Bruner agreed with Gardner that the intelligences were "useful fictions", and went on to state that "his approach is so far beyond the data-crunching of mental testers that it deserves to be cheered."

=== Triarchic theory of intelligence ===
Robert Sternberg proposed the triarchic theory of intelligence to provide a more comprehensive description of intellectual competence than traditional differential or cognitive theories of human ability. The triarchic theory describes three fundamental aspects of intelligence:

1. Analytic intelligence comprises the mental processes through which intelligence is expressed.
2. Creative intelligence is necessary when an individual is confronted with a challenge that is nearly, but not entirely, novel or when an individual is engaged in automatizing the performance of a task.
3. Practical intelligence is bound to a sociocultural milieu and involves adaptation to, selection of, and shaping of the environment to maximize fit in the context.

The triarchic theory does not argue against the validity of a general intelligence factor; instead, the theory posits that general intelligence is part of analytic intelligence, and only by considering all three aspects of intelligence can the full range of intellectual functioning be understood.

Sternberg updated the triarchic theory and renamed it to the Theory of Successful Intelligence. He now defines intelligence as an individual's assessment of success in life by the individual's own (idiographic) standards and within the individual's sociocultural context. Success is achieved by using combinations of analytical, creative, and practical intelligence. The three aspects of intelligence are referred to as processing skills. The processing skills are applied to the pursuit of success through what were the three elements of practical intelligence: adapting to, shaping of, and selecting of one's environments. The mechanisms that employ the processing skills to achieve success include utilizing one's strengths and compensating or correcting for one's weaknesses.

Sternberg's theories and research on intelligence remain contentious within the scientific community.

=== PASS theory of intelligence ===
Based on A. R. Luria's (1966) seminal work on the modularization of brain function, and supported by decades of neuroimaging research, the PASS Theory of Intelligence (Planning/Attention/Simultaneous/Successive) proposes that cognition is organized in three systems and the following four processes:

1. Planning involves executive functions responsible for controlling and organizing behavior, selecting and constructing strategies, and monitoring performance.
2. Attention is responsible for maintaining arousal levels and alertness, and ensuring focus on relevant stimuli.
3. Simultaneous processing is engaged when the relationship between items and their integration into whole units of information is required. Examples of this include recognizing figures, such as a triangle within a circle vs. a circle within a triangle, or the difference between "he had a shower before breakfast" and "he had breakfast before a shower."
4. Successive processing is required for organizing separate items in a sequence such as remembering a sequence of words or actions exactly in the order in which they had just been presented.

These four processes are functions of four areas of the brain. Planning is broadly located in the front part of our brains, the frontal lobe. Attention and arousal are combined functions of the frontal lobe and the lower parts of the cortex, although the parietal lobes are also involved in attention as well. Simultaneous processing and Successive processing occur in the posterior region or the back of the brain. Simultaneous processing is broadly associated with the occipital and the parietal lobes while Successive processing is broadly associated with the frontal-temporal lobes. The PASS theory is heavily indebted both to Luria and to studies in cognitive psychology involved in promoting a better look at intelligence.

=== Piaget's theory and Neo-Piagetian theories ===
In Piaget's theory of cognitive development the focus is not on mental abilities but rather on a child's mental models of the world. As a child develops, the child creates increasingly more accurate models of the world which enable the child to interact with the world more effectively. One example is object permanence with which the child develops a model in which objects continue to exist even when they cannot be seen, heard, or touched.

Piaget's theory described four main stages and many sub-stages in the development. These four main stages are:

1. sensorimotor stage (birth–2 years)
2. pre-operational stage (2–7 years)
3. concrete operational stage (7–11 years)
4. formal operations stage (11–16 years)

Progress through these stages is correlated with, but not identical to psychometric IQ. Piaget conceptualizes intelligence as an activity more than as a capacity.

One of Piaget's most famous studies focused purely on the discriminative abilities of children between the ages of two and a half years old, and four and a half years old. He began the study by taking children of different ages and placing two lines of sweets, one with the sweets in a line spread further apart, and one with the same number of sweets in a line placed more closely together. He found that, "Children between 2 years, 6 months old and 3 years, 2 months old correctly discriminate the relative number of objects in two rows; between 3 years, 2 months and 4 years, 6 months they indicate a longer row with fewer objects to have 'more'; after 4 years, 6 months they again discriminate correctly". Initially younger children were not studied, because if at the age of four years a child could not conserve quantity, then a younger child presumably could not either. The results show however that children that are younger than three years and two months have quantity conservation, but as they get older they lose this quality, and do not recover it until four and a half years old. This attribute may be lost temporarily because of an overdependence on perceptual strategies, which correlates more candy with a longer line of candy, or because of the inability for a four-year-old to reverse situations.

This experiment demonstrated several results. First, younger children have a discriminative ability that shows the logical capacity for cognitive operations exists earlier than previously acknowledged. Also, young children can be equipped with certain qualities for cognitive operations, depending on how logical the structure of the task is. Research also shows that children develop explicit understanding at age five and as a result, the child will count the sweets to decide which has more. Finally the study found that overall quantity conservation is not a basic characteristic of humans' native inheritance.

Piaget's theory has been criticized on the grounds that the age of appearance of a new model of the world, such as object permanence, is dependent on how the testing is done (see the article on object permanence). More generally, the theory may be very difficult to test empirically because of the difficulty of proving or disproving that a mental model is the explanation for the results of the testing.

Neo-Piagetian theories of cognitive development expand Piaget's theory in various ways such as also considering psychometric-like factors such as processing speed and working memory, "hypercognitive" factors like self-monitoring, more stages, and more consideration on how progress may vary in different domains such as spatial or social.

=== Parieto-frontal integration theory of intelligence ===
Based on a review of 37 neuroimaging studies, Jung and Haier proposed that the biological basis of intelligence stems from how well the frontal and parietal regions of the brain communicate and exchange information with each other. Subsequent neuroimaging and lesion studies report general consensus with the theory. A review of the neuroscience and intelligence literature concludes that the parieto-frontal integration theory is the best available explanation for human intelligence differences.

=== Investment theory ===
Based on the Cattell–Horn–Carroll theory, the tests of intelligence most often used in the relevant studies include measures of fluid ability (g_{f}) and crystallized ability (g_{c}); that differ in their trajectory of development in people. The "investment theory" by Cattell states that the individual differences observed in the procurement of skills and knowledge (g_{c}) are partially attributed to the "investment" of g_{f}, thus suggesting the involvement of fluid intelligence in every aspect of the learning process. The investment theory suggests that personality traits affect "actual" ability, and not scores on an IQ test.

Hebb's theory of intelligence suggested a bifurcation as well, Intelligence A (physiological), that could be seen as a semblance of fluid intelligence and Intelligence B (experiential), similar to crystallized intelligence.

=== Intelligence compensation theory (ICT) ===
The intelligence compensation theory states that individuals who are comparatively less intelligent work harder and more methodically, and become more resolute and thorough (more conscientious) in order to achieve goals, to compensate for their "lack of intelligence" whereas more intelligent individuals do not require traits/behaviours associated with the personality factor conscientiousness to progress as they can rely on the strength of their cognitive abilities as opposed to structure or effort. The theory suggests the existence of a causal relationship between intelligence and conscientiousness, such that the development of the personality trait of conscientiousness is influenced by intelligence. This assumption is deemed plausible as it is unlikely that the reverse causal relationship could occur; implying that the negative correlation would be higher between fluid intelligence (g_{f}) and conscientiousness. This is justified by the timeline of development of g_{f}, g_{c}, and personality, as crystallized intelligence would not have developed completely when personality traits develop. Subsequently, during school-going ages, more conscientious children would be expected to gain more crystallized intelligence (knowledge) through education, as they would be more efficient, thorough, hard-working, and dutiful.

This theory has recently been contradicted by evidence that identifies compensatory sample selection which attributes the findings to the bias that comes from selecting samples containing people above a certain threshold of achievement.

=== Bandura's theory of self-efficacy and cognition ===
The view of cognitive ability has evolved over the years, and it is no longer viewed as a fixed property held by an individual. Instead, the current perspective describes it as a general capacity, comprising not only cognitive, but motivational, social, and behavioural aspects as well. These facets work together to perform numerous tasks. An essential skill often overlooked is that of managing emotions and aversive experiences that can compromise one's quality of thought and activity. Bandura bridges the link between intelligence and success by crediting individual differences in self-efficacy. Bandura's theory identifies the difference between possessing skills and being able to apply them in challenging situations. The theory suggests that individuals with the same level of knowledge and skill may perform badly, averagely, or excellently based on differences in self-efficacy.

A key role of cognition is to allow for one to predict events and in turn devise methods to deal with these events effectively. These skills are dependent on processing of unclear and ambiguous stimuli. People must be able to rely on their reserve of knowledge to identify, develop, and execute options. They must be able to apply the learning acquired from previous experiences. Thus, a stable sense of self-efficacy is essential to stay focused on tasks in the face of challenging situations.

Bandura's theory of self-efficacy and intelligence suggests that individuals with a relatively low sense of self-efficacy in any field will avoid challenges. This effect is heightened when they perceive the situations as personal threats. When failure occurs, they recover from it more slowly than others, and credit the failure to an insufficient aptitude. On the other hand, persons with high levels of self-efficacy hold a task-diagnostic aim that leads to effective performance.

=== Process, personality, intelligence and knowledge theory (PPIK) ===
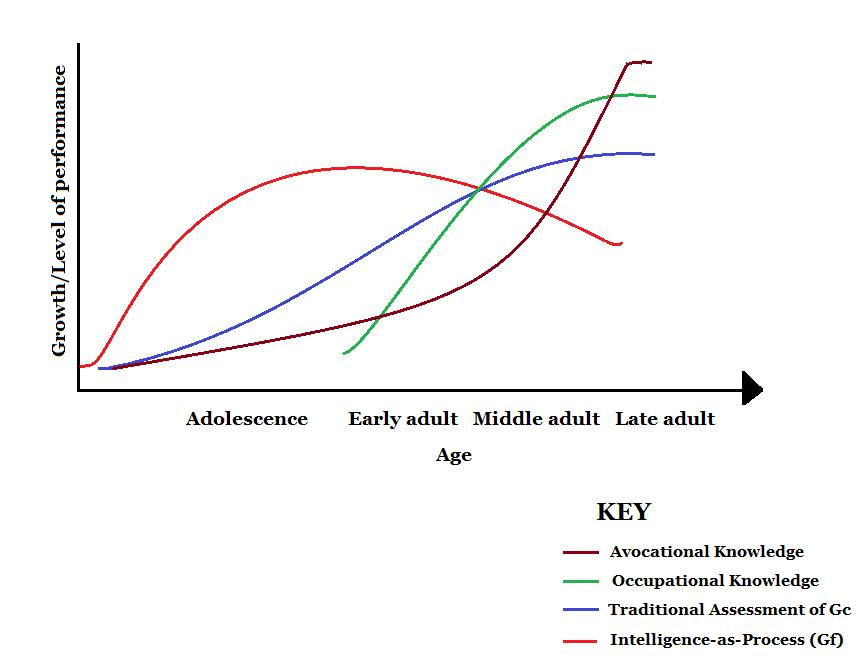
Predicted growth curves for Intelligence as process, crystallized intelligence, occupational knowledge, and avocational knowledge based on Ackerman's PPIK Theory

Developed by Ackerman, the PPIK (process, personality, intelligence, and knowledge) theory further develops the approach on intelligence as proposed by Cattell, the Investment theory, and Hebb, suggesting a distinction between intelligence as knowledge and intelligence as process (two concepts that are comparable and related to g_{c} and g_{f} respectively, but broader and closer to Hebb's notions of "Intelligence A" and "Intelligence B") and integrating these factors with elements such as personality, motivation, and interests.

Ackerman describes the difficulty of distinguishing process from knowledge, as content cannot be eliminated from any ability test.

Personality traits are not significantly correlated with the intelligence as process aspect except in the context of psychopathology. One exception to this generalization has been the finding of sex differences in cognitive abilities, specifically abilities in mathematical and spatial form.

On the other hand, the intelligence as knowledge factor has been associated with personality traits of Openness and Typical Intellectual Engagement, which also strongly correlate with verbal abilities (associated with crystallized intelligence).

=== Latent inhibition ===
It appears that Latent inhibition, the phenomenon of familiar stimuli having a postponed reaction time when compared with unfamiliar stimuli, has a positive correlation with creativity.

== Improving ==
=== Genetic engineering ===
Because intelligence appears to be at least partly dependent on brain structure and the genes shaping brain development, it has been proposed that genetic engineering could be used to enhance intelligence, a process sometimes called biological uplift in science fiction. Genetic enhancement experiments on mice have demonstrated superior ability in learning and memory in various behavioral tasks.

=== Education ===
Higher IQ leads to greater success in education, but independently, education raises IQ scores. A 2017 meta-analysis suggests education increases IQ by 1–5 points per year of education, or at least increases IQ test-taking ability.

=== Nutrition and chemicals ===
Substances which actually or purportedly improve intelligence or other mental functions are called nootropics. A meta analysis shows omega-3 fatty acids improve cognitive performance among those with cognitive deficits, but not among healthy subjects. A meta-regression shows omega-3 fatty acids improve the moods of patients with major depression (major depression is associated with cognitive nutrient deficits).

=== Activities and adult neural development ===
- Exercise enhances cognition for healthy and non healthy subjects
- Which (e.g. "intellectually demanding work") and how one does work
- Quality of sleep

=== Brain training ===
Attempts to raise IQ with brain training have led to increases on aspects related with the training tasks – for instance working memory – but it is yet unclear if these increases generalize to increased intelligence per se.

A 2008 research paper claimed that practicing a dual n-back task can increase fluid intelligence (g_{f}), as measured in several different standard tests. This finding received some attention from popular media, including an article in Wired. However, a subsequent criticism of the paper's methodology questioned the experiment's validity and took issue with the lack of uniformity in the tests used to evaluate the control and test groups. For example, the progressive nature of Raven's Advanced Progressive Matrices (APM) test may have been compromised by modifications of time restrictions (i.e., 10 minutes were allowed to complete a normally 45-minute test).

=== Philosophy ===
Efforts to influence intelligence raise ethical issues. Neuroethics considers the ethical, legal, and social implications of neuroscience, and deals with issues such as the difference between treating a human neurological disease and enhancing the human brain, and how wealth impacts access to neurotechnology. Neuroethical issues interact with the ethics of human genetic engineering.

Transhumanist theorists study the possibilities and consequences of developing and using techniques to enhance human abilities and aptitudes.

Eugenics is a social philosophy that advocates the improvement of human hereditary traits through various forms of intervention. Eugenics has variously been regarded as meritorious or deplorable in different periods of history, falling greatly into disrepute after the defeat of Nazi Germany in World War II.

== Measuring ==
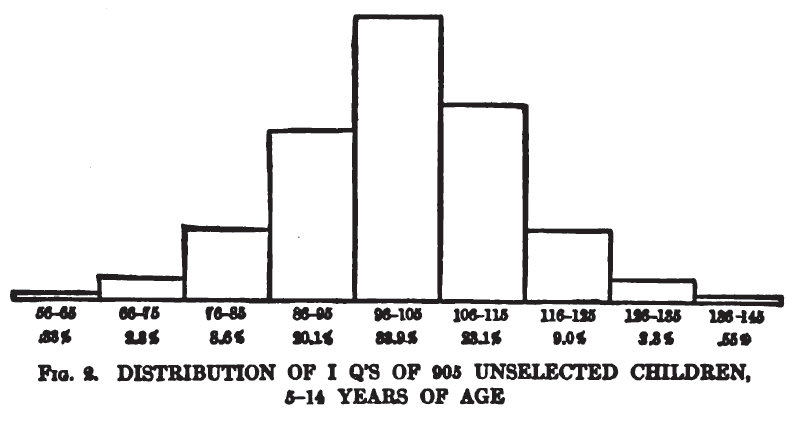
Score distribution chart for sample of 905 children tested on 1916 Stanford-Binet Test

The approach to understanding intelligence with the most supporters and published research over the longest period of time is based on psychometric testing. It is also by far the most widely used in practical settings. Intelligence quotient (IQ) tests include the Stanford-Binet, Raven's Progressive Matrices, the Wechsler Adult Intelligence Scale and the Kaufman Assessment Battery for Children. There are also psychometric tests that are not intended to measure intelligence itself but some closely related construct such as scholastic aptitude. In the United States examples include the SSAT, the SAT, the ACT, the GRE, the MCAT, the LSAT, and the GMAT. Regardless of the method used, almost any test that requires examinees to reason and has a wide range of question difficulty will produce intelligence scores that are approximately normally distributed in the general population.

Intelligence tests are widely used in educational, business, and military settings because of their efficacy in predicting behavior. IQ and g (discussed in the next section) are correlated with many important social outcomes—individuals with low IQs are more likely to be divorced, have a child out of marriage, be incarcerated, and need long-term welfare support, while individuals with high IQs are associated with more years of education, higher status jobs and higher income. Intelligence as measured by Psychometric tests has been found to be highly correlated with successful training and performance outcomes (e.g., adaptive performance), and IQ/g is the single best predictor of successful job performance; however, some researchers although largely concurring with this finding have advised caution in citing the strength of the claim due to a number of factors, these include: statistical assumptions imposed underlying some of these studies, studies done prior to 1970 which appear inconsistent with more recent studies, and ongoing debates within the Psychology literature as to the validity of current IQ measurement tools.

=== General intelligence factor or g ===
There are many different kinds of IQ tests using a wide variety of test tasks. Some tests consist of a single type of task, others rely on a broad collection of tasks with different contents (visual-spatial, verbal, numerical) and asking for different cognitive processes (e.g., reasoning, memory, rapid decisions, visual comparisons, spatial imagery, reading, and retrieval of general knowledge). The psychologist Charles Spearman early in the 20th century carried out the first formal factor analysis of correlations between various test tasks. He found a trend for all such tests to correlate positively with each other, which is called a positive manifold. Spearman found that a single common factor explained the positive correlations among tests. Spearman named it g for "general intelligence factor". He interpreted it as the core of human intelligence that, to a larger or smaller degree, influences success in all cognitive tasks and thereby creates the positive manifold. This interpretation of g as a common cause of test performance is still dominant in psychometrics. (Although, an alternative interpretation was recently advanced by van der Maas and colleagues. Their mutualism model assumes that intelligence depends on several independent mechanisms, none of which influences performance on all cognitive tests. These mechanisms support each other so that efficient operation of one of them makes efficient operation of the others more likely, thereby creating the positive manifold.)

IQ tests can be ranked by how highly they load on the g factor. Tests with high g-loadings are those that correlate highly with most other tests. One comprehensive study investigating the correlations between a large collection of tests and tasks has found that the Raven's Progressive Matrices have a particularly high correlation with most other tests and tasks. The Raven's is a test of inductive reasoning with abstract visual material. It consists of a series of problems, sorted approximately by increasing difficulty. Each problem presents a 3 x 3 matrix of abstract designs with one empty cell; the matrix is constructed according to a rule, and the person must find out the rule to determine which of 8 alternatives fits into the empty cell. Because of its high correlation with other tests, the Raven's Progressive Matrices are generally acknowledged as a good indicator of general intelligence. This is problematic, however, because there are substantial gender differences on the Raven's, which are not found when g is measured directly by computing the general factor from a broad collection of tests.

Several critics, such as Stephen Jay Gould, have been critical of g, seeing it as a statistical artifact, and that IQ tests instead measure a number of unrelated abilities. The 1995 American Psychological Association's report "Intelligence: Knowns and Unknowns" stated that IQ tests do correlate and that the view that g is a statistical artifact was a minority one.

=== General collective intelligence factor or c ===
A recent scientific understanding of collective intelligence, defined as a group's general ability to perform a wide range of tasks, expands the areas of human intelligence research applying similar methods and concepts to groups. Definition, operationalization and methods are similar to the psychometric approach of general individual intelligence where an individual's performance on a given set of cognitive tasks is used to measure intelligence indicated by the general intelligence factor g extracted via factor analysis. In the same vein, collective intelligence research aims to discover a c factor' explaining between-group differences in performance as well as structural and group compositional causes for it.

=== Historical psychometric theories ===
Several different theories of intelligence have historically been important for psychometrics. Often they emphasized more factors than a single one like in g factor.

=== Cattell–Horn–Carroll theory ===
Many of the broad, recent IQ tests have been greatly influenced by the Cattell–Horn–Carroll theory. It is argued to reflect much of what is known about intelligence from research. A hierarchy of factors for human intelligence is used. g is at the top. Under it there are 10 broad abilities that in turn are subdivided into 70 narrow abilities. The broad abilities are:

- Fluid intelligence (Gf): includes the broad ability to reason, form concepts, and solve problems using unfamiliar information or novel procedures.
- Crystallized intelligence (Gc): includes the breadth and depth of a person's acquired knowledge, the ability to communicate one's knowledge, and the ability to reason using previously learned experiences or procedures.
- Quantitative reasoning (Gq): the ability to comprehend quantitative concepts and relationships and to manipulate numerical symbols.
- Reading & writing ability (Grw): includes basic reading and writing skills.
- Short-term memory (Gsm): is the ability to apprehend and hold information in immediate awareness and then use it within a few seconds.
- Long-term storage and retrieval (Glr): is the ability to store information and fluently retrieve it later in the process of thinking.
- Visual processing (Gv): is the ability to perceive, analyze, synthesize, and think with visual patterns, including the ability to store and recall visual representations.
- Auditory processing (Ga): is the ability to analyze, synthesize, and discriminate auditory stimuli, including the ability to process and discriminate speech sounds that may be presented under distorted conditions.
- Processing speed (Gs): is the ability to perform automatic cognitive tasks, particularly when measured under pressure to maintain focused attention.
- Decision/reaction time/speed (Gt): reflect the immediacy with which an individual can react to stimuli or a task (typically measured in seconds or fractions of seconds; not to be confused with Gs, which typically is measured in intervals of 2–3 minutes). See Mental chronometry.

Modern tests do not necessarily measure of all of these broad abilities. For example, Gq and Grw may be seen as measures of school achievement and not IQ. Gt may be difficult to measure without special equipment.

g was earlier often subdivided into only Gf and Gc which were thought to correspond to the nonverbal or performance subtests and verbal subtests in earlier versions of the popular Wechsler IQ test. More recent research has shown the situation to be more complex.

=== Insufficiency of measurement via IQ ===
Reliability and validity are very different concepts. While reliability reflects reproducibility, validity refers to whether the test measures what it purports to measure. While IQ tests are generally considered to measure some forms of intelligence, they may fail to serve as an accurate measure of broader definitions of human intelligence inclusive of, for example, creativity and social intelligence. For this reason, psychologist Wayne Weiten argues that their construct validity must be carefully qualified, and not be overstated. According to Weiten, "IQ tests are valid measures of the kind of intelligence necessary to do well in academic work. But if the purpose is to assess intelligence in a broader sense, the validity of IQ tests is questionable."

Along these same lines, critics such as Keith Stanovich do not dispute the capacity of IQ test scores to predict some kinds of achievement, but argue that basing a concept of intelligence on IQ test scores alone neglects other important aspects of mental ability. Robert Sternberg, another significant critic of IQ as the main measure of human cognitive abilities, argued that reducing the concept of intelligence to the measure of g does not fully account for the different skills and knowledge types that produce success in human society. Further, just as the norming of IQ scores to a mean of 100 can set limitations to its long-term reliability, so too can it set limitations to IQ's measurement invariance.

Despite these criticisms, clinical psychologists generally regard IQ scores as having sufficient statistical validity for many clinical purposes, such as diagnosing intellectual disability, tracking cognitive decline, and informing personnel decisions, because they provide well-normed, easily interpretable indices with known standard errors.

A study suggested that intelligence is composed of distinct cognitive systems, each of which having its own capacity and being (to some degree) independent of other components, with the cognitive profile being emergent from anatomically distinct cognitive systems (such as brain regions or neural networks). For example, IQ and reading-/language-related traits/skills appear to be influenced "at least partly [by] distinct genetic factors".

Various types of potential measures related to some definitions of intelligence but not part of IQ measurement include:

- Cognitive flexibility – abilities in switching between different concepts, or to adapt behaviour in novel or changing environments
- Moral intelligence
- Prioritization and goal-selection
- Direct measures of brain activity and other neuroimaging intelligence testing – partly investigated in the neuroscience of intelligence

== Intelligence across cultures ==
Psychologists have shown that the definition of human intelligence is unique to the culture that one is studying. Robert Sternberg is among the researchers who have discussed how one's culture affects the person's interpretation of intelligence, and he further believes that to define intelligence in only one way without considering different meanings in cultural contexts may cast an investigative and unintentionally egocentric view on the world. To negate this, psychologists offer the following definitions of intelligence:

1. Successful intelligence is the skills and knowledge needed for success in life, according to one's own definition of success, within one's sociocultural context.
2. Analytical intelligence is the result of intelligence's components applied to fairly abstract but familiar kinds of problems.
3. Creative intelligence is the result of intelligence's components applied to relatively novel tasks and situations.
4. Practical intelligence is the result of intelligence's components applied to experience for purposes of adaption, shaping and selection.

Although typically identified by its western definition, multiple studies support the idea that human intelligence carries different meanings across cultures around the world. In many Eastern cultures, intelligence is mainly related with one's social roles and responsibilities. A Chinese conception of intelligence would define it as the ability to empathize with and understand others — although this is by no means the only way that intelligence is defined in China. In several African communities, intelligence is shown similarly through a social lens. However, rather than through social roles, as in many Eastern cultures, it is exemplified through social responsibilities. For example, in the language of Chi-Chewa, which is spoken by some ten million people across central Africa, the equivalent term for intelligence implies not only cleverness but also the ability to take on responsibility. Furthermore, within American culture there are a variety of interpretations of intelligence present as well. One of the most common views on intelligence within American societies defines it as a combination of problem-solving skills, deductive reasoning skills, and Intelligence quotient (IQ), while other American societies point out that intelligent people should have a social conscience, accept others for who they are, and be able to give advice or wisdom.

== Motivational intelligence ==
Motivational intelligence refers to an individual's capacity to comprehend and utilize various motivations, such as the need for achievement, affiliation, or power. It involves understanding tacit knowledge related to these motivations. This concept encompasses the ability to recognize and appreciate the diverse values, behaviors, and cultural differences of others, driven by intrinsic interest rather than solely to enhance interaction effectiveness.

Research suggests a relationship between motivational intelligence, international experiences, and leadership. Individuals with higher levels of motivational intelligence tend to exhibit greater enthusiasm for learning about other cultures, thereby contributing to their effectiveness in cross-cultural settings. However, studies have also revealed variations in motivational intelligence across ethnicities, with Asian students demonstrating higher cognitive cultural intelligence but lower motivational intelligence compared to other groups.

Investigations have explored the impact of motivational intelligence on job motivation. A study conducted on employees of Isfahan Gas Company indicated a positive and significant relationship between motivational intelligence and two of its indicators, namely adaptability and social relationship, with job motivation. These findings highlight the potential influence of motivational intelligence on individuals' motivation levels within work contexts.

Motivational intelligence has been identified as a strong predictor, superseding knowledge intelligence, behavioral intelligence, and strategic intelligence. It holds a crucial role in promoting cooperation, which is considered the ideal and essential element of motivational intelligence. Therapeutic approaches grounded in motivational intelligence emphasize a collaborative partnership between the therapist and client. The therapist creates an environment conducive to change without imposing their views or attempting to force awareness or acceptance of reality onto the client.

Motivational intelligence encompasses the understanding of motivations, such as achievement, affiliation, and power, as well as the appreciation of cultural differences and values. It has been found to impact areas such as international experiences, leadership, job motivation, and cooperative therapeutic interventions.

== See also ==
- Evolution of human intelligence – Evolution-related timelines
- Flynn effect – 20th-century rise in intelligence test scores
- Genius – Exceptional intellectual ability, creativity, or originality
- Intellect – Faculty of the human mind
- Neuroscience and intelligence § Humans – Neurological factors responsible for intelligence
- Outline of human intelligence
- Self-test of Intelligence
- Sex differences in intelligence – Area of scientific research
- Superintelligence – Hypothetical agent surpassing human intelligence
- Theory of multiple intelligences – Educational model of human intelligence
- Volition (psychology) – Cognitive process of decision to act

== Sources ==
- Anastasi, Anne; Urbina, Susana (1997). Psychological Testing (7th ed.). Upper Saddle River, NJ: Prentice Hall. ISBN 978-0-02-303085-7.
- Gould, Stephen Jay (1981). The Mismeasure of Man. New York: W. W. Norton. ISBN 978-0-393-30056-7.
- Gould, Stephen Jay (1996). The Mismeasure of Man (Rev. and expanded ed.). New York: W. W. Norton. ISBN 978-0-393-31425-0.
- Kaufman, Alan S. (2009). IQ Testing 101. New York: Springer Publishing. ISBN 978-0-8261-0629-2.
- Neisser, Ulrich; Boodoo, Gwyneth; Bouchard, Thomas J.; Boykin, A. Wade; Brody, Nathan; Ceci, Stephen J.; Halpern, Diane F.; Loehlin, John C.; et al. (1996). "Intelligence: Knowns and unknowns" (PDF). American Psychologist. 51 (2): 77–101. Bibcode:1996AmPsy..51...77N. doi:10.1037/0003-066x.51.2.77. ISSN 0003-066X. S2CID 20957095.
