= Dean–Woodcock Neuropsychological Assessment System =

- Purpose: assessing an individual's sensory, motor, emotional, cognitive function

The Dean–Woodcock Neuropsychological Assessment System (DWNAS) provides a standardized procedure for assessing an individual's sensory, motor, emotional, cognitive, and academic functioning for both English and Spanish speakers, based on the Cattell–Horn–Carroll Model (CHC). The instrument may be administered by psychologists, that need not have neuropsychological backgrounds. It was developed by, and is named after, psychologists Raymond Dean and Richard Woodcock.

The DWNB consists of the Dean–Woodcock Sensory-Motor Battery (DWSMB) (Dean & Woodcock, 2003c), the Dean–Woodcock Structured Neuropsychological Interview (Dean & Woodcock, 2003d), and the Dean–Woodcock Emotional Status Examination (Dean & Woodcock, 2003a). When the DWNAS is used with the Woodcock Johnson III (WJ III) (Woodcock, McGrew, & Mather, 2001), or the Bateria III Woodcock-Muñoz (Bateria III) (Muñoz-Sandoval, Woodcock, McGrew, & Mather, 2004), a profile of an individual's sensory, motor, emotional, cognitive, and academic functioning is obtained.

The DWNAS offers a neuropsychological interpretation of the WJ III and Bateria III. A fundamental element of the DWNAS is that it provides both a clinical neurological and empirical theoretical base (CHC) to assessment. The DWSMB is a battery of tests drawn primarily from the traditional neurological examination to provide coverage of basic sensory, motor functions and sub-cortical functioning, most of which have pathognomonic neurological signs. The DWSMB is divided into two major sections — sensory and/or the Bateria III motor. Motor tests are predominantly meant to measure motor functioning at the cortical level. Multiple cognitive functions necessary in neuropsychological assessment are offered by the WJ-III or the Bateria III.

The Dean–Woodcock Structured Interview and the Dean–Woodcock Emotional Status Examination provide information regarding the patient's history and current psychological and medical functioning. They address the need in neuropsychological assessment to consider factors that may inhibit or facilitate a patient's performance.

Unlike most other neuropsychological batteries for adults (such as the Luria–Nebraska, the Halstead–Reitan, and so forth), the Dean–Woodcock battery does not contain tests of prefrontal lobe function, so it cannot be used to evaluate the executive functioning on an individual. This is both an advantage and a shortcoming of the battery. The advantage is that it makes the battery much cheaper, less time-consuming to administer, and potentially less tiring and frustrating for the examinee. The shortcoming is that most neuropsychologists would need to supplement the battery with one or more executive functioning tests (tests sensitive to prefrontal lobe functions; e.g., the Delis–Kaplan Executive Function System, or a combination of other tests).
