= Chartered Institute of Ergonomics and Human Factors =

United Kingdom–based professional society

- CIEHF logo
- Formation: 27 September 1949; 77 years ago
- President: Martin Thody
- Website: www.ergonomics.org.uk

The Chartered Institute of Ergonomics and Human Factors (CIEHF – formerly The Ergonomics Society) is a United Kingdom–based professional society for ergonomists, human factors specialists, and those involved in user-centred design.

== History ==
The Ergonomics Society was officially created on 17 September 1949 at a meeting of a number of academics at the Admiralty in London. Among the founding members were Frederic Bartlett, Donald Broadbent, W. E. Hick, Alan Welford, and J. S. Weiner.

In 1957 it started to publish the periodical journal Ergonomics. Today the Institute publishes Ergonomics in partnership with Taylor & Francis and Applied Ergonomics with Elsevier.

In 2014, by a Privy Council Order, Elizabeth II granted a Royal Charter to the Institute, leading to a change of name, to the Chartered Institute of Ergonomics and Human Factors.

== Activities ==
The CIEHF makes a number of awards for accomplishments in ergonomics and human factors including the President's Award and Lifetime Achievement Awards for major contributions to ergonomics.

The Institute has a number of Sector Groups including healthcare, nuclear and aviation.

The CIEHF has its office in Warwickshire. By the end of 2025 there were 2200 members and more than 700 members who were eligible for Chartered status.

In 2008, to mark the journal's 50th year of publication, a special issue of "Ergonomics" (Volume 51, Number 1) was published, guest edited by Neville A. Stanton and Rob Stammers, covering the history of the society and including a re-print of the Ergonomics Research Society lecture given by Sir Frederic Bartlett in 1962.

The CIEHF has worked in partnership with other organisations and the UK Government to establish the Occupational Health & Safety Consultant Register.

== Elected Role Holders ==
Executive Committee
Year	President	President Elect	Treasurer
2025 - 2026	Martin Thody	Fran Ives	Bob Bridger
2024 - 2025	Mark Young	Martin Thody	Bob Bridger
2023 - 2024	Barry Kirby	Mark Young	Bob Bridger
2022 - 2023	Alex Stedmon	Barry Kirby	Jon Berman
2021 - 2022	Chris Ramsden	Alex Stedmon	Jon Berman
2020 - 2021	Amanda Widdowson	Chris Ramsden	Jon Berman
2019 - 2020	Bob Bridger	Amanda Widdowson	Jon Berman
