= Vernon's verbal-perceptual model =

Theory about the structure of intelligence

Vernon's verbal-perceptual model is a theory about the structure of intelligence proposed by Philip E. Vernon in 1964 (Vernon, 1964, 1965). It was influenced by the theory of g factor.

Vernon puts emphasis on the g factor in all the mental abilities. He extracted the g factor from an ability test, then found that those remaining content could be divided into two separate parts. He named those two orthogonal group factors as verbal-educational factor (v:ed) and perceptual-mechanical skill factor (k:m).

v:ed factor: verbal and educational abilities

k:m factor: spatial, practical, and mechanical abilities

This is a rough distinction between verbal and non-verbal intelligence measurement.

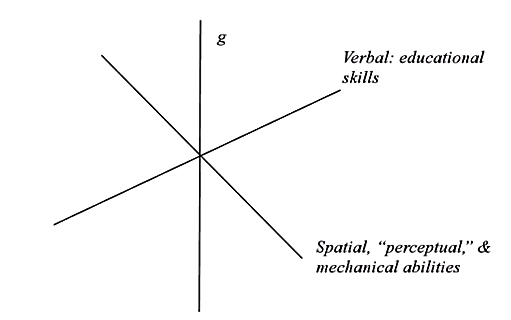
Verbal perceptual model

Vernon also said that v:ed and k:m can represent different education and cultural experience. The v:ed factor may come from school life and k:m factor comes from skills forming in non-school time. Vernon considered that there might be a third special factor named mathematical skill, but it can be included in perceptual-mechanical (k:m) factor.

== Difference from Horn and Cattell's Gf-Gc theory ==
Vernon's model about intelligence looks similar to the fluid-crystallized (Gf-Gc) intelligence theory because they both agree with g factor and have two more different dimensions on intelligence structure. In fact, Gf-Gc model has more broad factors such as special visualization (Gv), retrieval (Gr) or speed factor (Gs).

"One reason why the Horn-Cattell model has more broad group factors than Vernon's is simply that they analysed a very much larger and more carefully chosen battery of tests. This probably explains why the Vernon model does not contain any group factors corresponding to Cattell's Gr (and why it had to be added by Johnson and Bouchard, 2005, when they tried to fit the Vernon model to a much larger data set)." IQ and human intelligence

== See also ==
- g-VPR model
