= Self-test of intelligence =

A self-test of intelligence is a psychological test that someone can take to purportedly measure one's own intelligence.

As with other intelligence tests, a self-test of intelligence normally consists of a series of verbal and non-verbal intellectual tasks and puzzles. These tests usually give the taker instructions on how to complete the tasks and offer a performance score after the test has been completed.

These self-tests can be performed in various ways that are quick, easy, and can be done at home or on the go. Web sites on the internet, apps for mobile devices, and one or more books are choices for taking these tests.

Self-tests of intelligence can contribute to the self-assessed intelligence (SAI) of a person, where SAI can be defined as people's estimates of their cognitive abilities in relation to the overall population.

== Resources for self-tests of intelligence ==
=== Websites on the internet ===
Various self-tests of intelligence are offered online on the internet. The self-tests should be treated as entertainment.

The official website of Mensa International, which is the largest and oldest high IQ society in the world, does not offer an online IQ test. It does offer an online quiz for entertainment purposes called the "Mensa Workout." Sites that claim to offer a Mensa IQ test online may not be related to this organization.

Even though the results of a single website may not be reliable, it is possible to use various websites offering self-tests that may produce varying results.

=== Apps for mobile devices ===
There are apps for devices such as smartphones and tablets for self-tests with names such as IQ Test and What's My IQ?. These apps are offered on app stores like the iOS App Store and the Google Play Store.

Some of these apps - for example IQ Test - Brain Training Puzzle Game and Stupidmeter - tool to test your intelligence - are mainly meant for entertainment purposes and can be considered games.

=== Books ===
There are also books that offer self-tests of intelligence. Some of these books are mainly meant to train the reader for official IQ tests.

== Self-tests versus other tests of intelligence ==
Self-tests of intelligence are quite different from tests that are administered by others, like the Woodcock–Johnson Tests of Cognitive Abilities, the Stanford-Binet IQ test, and the Wonderlic test as with a self-test normally no other parties are involved in the assessment of one's intelligence.

Other tests of intelligence are mostly performed under more controlled circumstances: under the supervision of trained psychologists.

Self-tests are normally based on individual motives like curiosity, test anxiety, or pride.

== Characteristics of self-tests of intelligence ==
There are various types of self-tests of intelligence, those that offer a general score, and those that offer a score based on parts of one's abilities, like logical, numeric, expressive, spatial and other abilities. Intelligence can be seen as a very complex concept, in that it encompasses many dimensions. Also emotional intelligence can be measured and self-reports of this have been investigated.

== Studies on self-assessed intelligence ==
According to Tatiana V. Kornilova et al. The concept of self-assessed intelligence (SAI) appeared at the intersection of three major fields of research: studies of self-evaluation and self-esteem, studies of lay (or implicit) theories of intelligence, and studies of intelligence as a general cognitive ability.

The relation between narcissistic traits of a person who performs self-evaluations of intelligence has been studied in relation with physical attractiveness.

Also, the relation between self-assessed intelligence and academic performance has been studied.
