= John Bissell Carroll =

American psychologist (1916–2003)

- Born: John Bissell Carroll; June 5, 1916; Hartford, Connecticut, U.S.
- Died: July 1, 2003 (aged 87); Fairbanks, Alaska, U.S.
- Education: Wesleyan University (BA); University of Minnesota; University of Chicago (PhD)
- Known for: Modern Language Aptitude Test; Three-stratum theory
- Awards: E. L. Thorndike Award (1970); James McKeen Cattell Fellow Award (1998)
- Scientific career
- Fields: Psychometrics; Applied psychology
- Workplaces: Mount Holyoke College; Indiana University; University of Chicago; Harvard University; University of North Carolina at Chapel Hill
- Thesis: A Factor Analysis of Verbal Abilities (1941)
- Doctoral advisor: Louis Leon Thurstone

John Bissell Carroll (June 5, 1916 – July 1, 2003) was an American psychologist known for his contributions to psychology, linguistics and psychometrics.

== Early life and education ==
Carroll was born in Hartford, Connecticut. Early in his life, Carroll became interested in music and language. His interest in language was furthered by his friendship with Benjamin Lee Whorf at the age of thirteen and discussing Whorf's ideas about a close connection between culture and language. Carroll also helped to edit and publish Whorf's Language, Thought and Reality in 1956.

Carroll studied at Wesleyan University, majoring in classics and graduating summa cum laude in 1937. He attended the University of Minnesota to earn a doctoral degree in psychology afterwards. At the University of Minnesota, Carroll began studying under B. F. Skinner, but soon discovered that he was more interested in working with large numbers of subjects rather than Skinner's individual subjects approach. Skinner directed Carroll to L. L. Thurstone at the University of Chicago, where he was able to pursue his interest in psychometrics. During this time, he focused his studies on verbal aptitude and completed his dissertation, “A Factor Analysis of Verbal Abilities”, in 1941.

== Career ==
After finishing his education, Carroll's first position was at Mount Holyoke College (1940–42). Mary Searle, who received her B.A. in psychology from Mount Holyoke in 1941, married Carroll after graduation. After Mount Holyoke, Carroll taught at Indiana University (1942–43), the University of Chicago (1943–44), Harvard Graduate School of Education, (Roy E. Larsen Professor of Education, 1949–67) and the University of North Carolina, (William R. Kenan Jr., Professor of Psychology 1974–82, Director of L. L. Thurstone Psychometric Laboratory, 1974–79). He was also a psychologist with the United States Navy, (1944–46), the Department of the Army, (1946–49) and the Educational Testing Service (1967–74).

== Contributions ==
One of Carroll's early projects in the 1950s involved developing a test of language aptitude (the Modern Language Aptitude Test (1953–58), or MLAT). The project grew out of the US Army's requests for a way to identify people who could easily learn foreign languages for training purposes. Carroll received a grant for foreign language learning aptitude research through the Carnegie Corporation and worked with Stanley Sapon and the US Army-Air Force to develop the MLAT. The MLAT was first published in 1959 by The Psychological Corporation and was still sometimes used as of 2004.

In his paper "Fundamental considerations in testing for English language proficiency of foreign students", published in 1961, Carroll challenged the language testing field's reliance on discrete-point testing. This is an analytical approach to language testing in which each test question is meant to measure one distinct content point. Carroll supported using an integrative testing design, in which each question requires the test-taker to use more than one skill or piece of knowledge at a time and may be a more natural representation of the test-taker's knowledge of the language. Carroll's paper influenced the design of the Test of English as a Foreign Language, or TOEFL, which combined both discrete-point and integrative methods for the assessment.

In 1962, Carroll presented his Model of School Learning. In the model, Carroll defined a hypothetical framework used to predict achievement in schools. The framework was made up of two kinds of variables: individual differences and instructional variables. Individual differences related to general intelligence, aptitudes and motivation while instructional variables related to instructional quality and duration.

Carroll's 800-page work, Human Cognitive Abilities: A Survey of Factor-Analytic Studies, was published in 1993. In the book, Carroll proposed his psychological theory about three different levels of cognition, the Three Stratum Theory.

In 1994, he was one of 52 signatories on Mainstream Science on Intelligence, a public statement written by Linda Gottfredson and published in the Wall Street Journal as a response to what the authors viewed as inaccurate and misleading reports made by the media regarding academic consensus on the results of intelligence research in the wake of the appearance of The Bell Curve earlier the same year.

== Selected publications ==
Selected from over 400 books and articles.

- Carroll, J B 1956 Language, Thought, and Reality: Selected Writings of Benjamin Lee Whorf M.I.T. Press, Boston.
- Carroll, J B 1993 Human Cognitive Abilities: A survey of factor-analytic studies Cambridge University Press, Cambridge.
- Carroll, J B, Davies, P, & Richman, B 1971 The American Heritage Word Frequency Book. Houghton Mifflin, New York.
- Carroll, J B, Sapon, S M 1959 Modern Language Aptitude Test The Psychological Corporation, San Antonio, Texas.
- Carroll, J B, 1961 "Fundamental considerations in testing for English language proficiency of foreign students". In Testing Center for Applied Linguistics, Washington, DC. Reprinted in Allen, H B & Campbell R N 1972 Teaching English as a Second Language: A Book of Readings McGraw Hill, New York.
- “John B. Carroll.” Human Intelligence. 2003. Indiana University. 27 June 2006. .

== See also ==
- Cattell–Horn–Carroll theory
- g factor
- Educational psychology
- Language education
