= Woodcock Lake =

Lake in Kandiyohi County, Minnesota

- Location within Minnesota
- Location: Kandiyohi County, Minnesota
- Coordinates: 45°14′32″N 94°57′1″W
- Type: lake

Woodcock Lake is a lake in Kandiyohi County, in the U.S. state of Minnesota.

Woodcock Lake was named for Elijah T. Woodcock, a pioneer who settled there.

== See also ==
- List of lakes in Minnesota
