= Alaska Board of Nursing =

The Alaska Board of Nursing is the regional board of nurses in the state of Alaska, United States. The board meets four times a year.
