= Three-stratum theory =

Cognitive ability theory

The three-stratum theory is a theory of cognitive ability proposed by the American psychologist John Carroll in 1993. It is based on a factor-analytic study of the correlation of individual-difference variables from data such as psychological tests, school marks and competence ratings from more than 460 datasets. These analyses suggested a three-layered model where each layer accounts for the variations in the correlations within the previous layer.

The three layers (strata) are defined as representing narrow, broad, and general cognitive ability. The factors describe stable and observable differences among individuals in the performance of tasks. Carroll argues further that they are not mere artifacts of a mathematical process, but likely reflect physiological factors explaining differences in ability (e.g., nerve firing rates). This does not alter the effectiveness of factor scores in accounting for behavioral differences.

Carroll proposes a taxonomic dimension in the distinction between level factors and speed factors. The tasks that contribute to the identification of level factors can be sorted by difficulty and individuals differentiated by whether they have acquired the skill to perform the tasks. Tasks that contribute to speed factors are distinguished by the relative speed with which individuals can complete them. Carroll suggests that the distinction between level and speed factors may be the broadest taxonomy of cognitive tasks that can be offered. Carroll distinguishes his hierarchical approach from taxonomic approaches such as Guilford's Structure of Intellect model (three-dimensional model with contents, operations, and products).

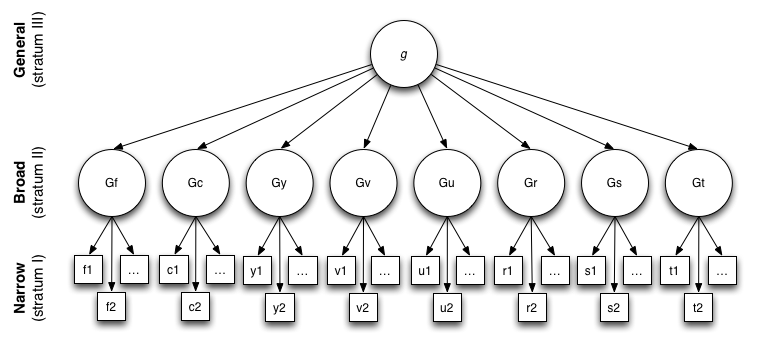
Carroll's three-stratum model. Key: fluid intelligence (Gf), crystallized intelligence (Gc), general memory and learning (Gy), broad visual perception (Gv), broad auditory perception (Gu), broad retrieval ability (Gr), broad cognitive speediness (Gs), and processing speed (Gt). Carroll regarded the broad abilities as different "flavors" of g.

== Development of the three-stratum theory ==
The three-stratum theory is derived primarily from Spearman's (1927) model of general intelligence and Horn & Cattell's (1966) theory of fluid and crystallized intelligence. Carroll's model was also heavily influenced by the 1976 edition of the ETS standard kit. His factor analyses were largely consistent with the Horn-Cattell model except that Carroll believed that general intelligence was a meaningful construct.

This model suggests that intelligence is best conceptualized in a hierarchy of three strata.

Stratum III (general intelligence): g factor, accounts for the correlations among the broad abilities at Stratum II.

Stratum II (broad abilities): 8 broad abilities—fluid intelligence, crystallized intelligence, general memory and learning, broad visual perception, broad auditory perception, broad retrieval ability, broad cognitive speediness, and processing speed.

Stratum I (specific level): more specific factors under the stratum II.

Kevin McGrew (2005) integrated the Horn-Cattell model with Carroll's to create the Cattell-Horn-Carroll Theory of Cognitive Abilities (CHC Theory), which has since been influential in guiding test development. Johnson and Bouchard have criticized CHC theory and the two major theories on which it is based, suggesting that their g-VPR model provides a better explanation of the available data.

== See also ==
- CHC theory
- g factor
- Fluid and crystallized intelligence
- g-VPR model
