= Riverside Insights =

American educational technology company

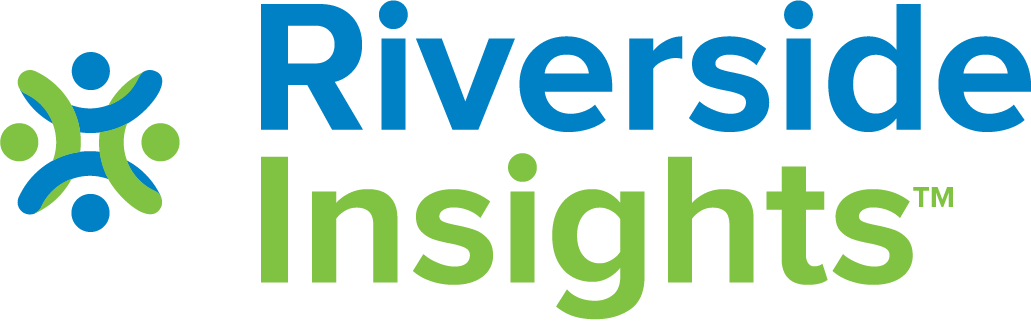
- Type: Private, Subsidiary
- Industry: Education
- Founded: 1979
- Headquarters: Remote
- Key people: Vivek Kartha (CEO)
- Products: Clinical and educational standardized test materials
- Number of employees: 300
- Parent: Alpine Investors
- Website: www.riversideinsights.com

Riverside Insights is a remote, educational technology company and developer of clinical and educational standardized assessments in the United States. It is a charter member of the Association of Test Publishers.

Riverside Insights was established as a wholly owned subsidiary of Houghton Mifflin Harcourt (HMH) in 1979. HMH sold Riverside Insights to private equity firm Alpine Investors for $140 million in 2018. The company was incorporated as Riverside Assessments LLC in Delaware and subsequently in other states, including Illinois.

== History ==
=== Early history ===
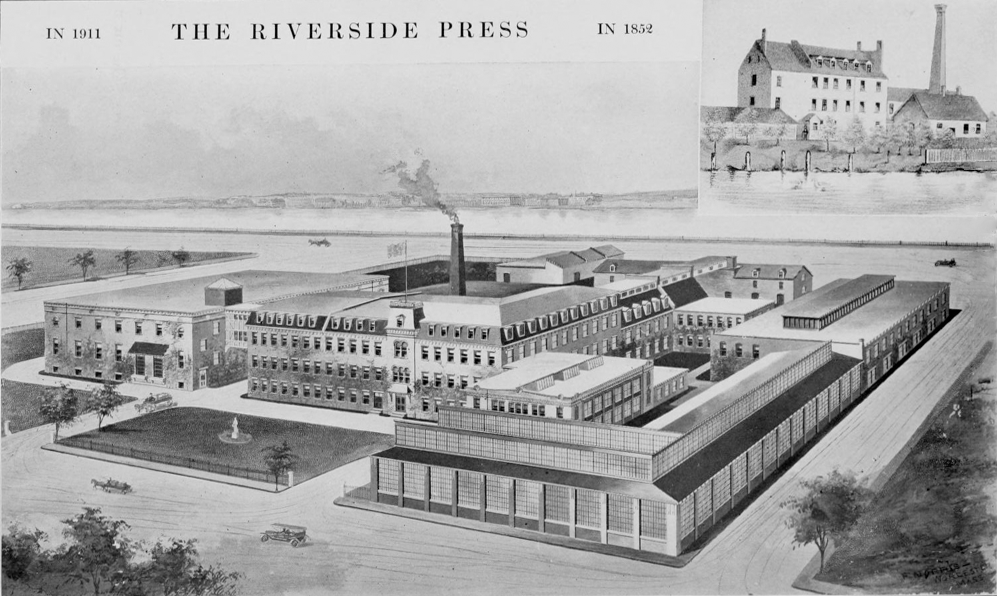
The Riverside Press headquarters as it appeared in 1911 and, in the top right-hand corner, the original facility from 1852

Riverside originated in 1852 as The Riverside Press, a book printing plant in Boston, Massachusetts. Henry Houghton originally started The Riverside Press in an old Cambridge building along the banks of the Charles River. A visitor described it as "one of the model printing-offices in America". Houghton chose to employ women as well as men as compositors, a radical decision which he said was influenced by the Victoria Press in England.

Mr. Houghton, one of the proprietors of the Riverside Press, took me over that vast establishment. The composing-room is ninety feet long, the walls were adorned with engravings, the window-sills bright with flowers, embellishments said to be due to "refining feminine influence." The men and women were working side by side". – Emily Faithfull

In 1880, George Mifflin entered into a partnership with Henry Houghton and together founded and led Houghton Mifflin Company. They soon established an educational department and quickly expanded the company's educational offerings.

=== Modern era ===
Beginning with the publication of the Stanford-Binet Intelligence Scale during World War I, Houghton Mifflin became increasingly involved in publishing standardized tests. The Riverside Publishing Company was officially established as a wholly owned subsidiary of Houghton Mifflin in 1979. HMH sold Riverside to private equity firm Alpine Investors who renamed it as Riverside Insights in 2018. It is now a remote company.

Throughout the 2010s and 2020s, Riverside Insights expanded its portfolio and updated its assessment tools to address evolving educational needs. Strategic acquisitions strengthened its offerings. In October 2019, the company acquired ESGI, a formative assessment software provider for early childhood educators, integrating real-time progress monitoring tools to support individualized instruction for Pre-K through 2nd grade students. In June 2022, Riverside Insights acquired Aperture Education, a provider of social-emotional learning (SEL) assessments for K–12 schools, extending its portfolio beyond ability and achievement testing.

The company also introduced significant updates to its flagship assessment products. In February 2025, it launched the Woodcock-Johnson^{®} V (WJ V), a fully digital system measuring intellectual abilities, academic achievement, and oral language skills, featuring updated norms, automated scoring, and new tests and clusters to enhance efficiency and accuracy. In August 2025, updated post-pandemic norms were released for the Cognitive Abilities Test™ (CogAT^{®}) and the Iowa Assessments, providing nationally representative samples from millions of student records to support equitable identification, differentiated instruction, and planning for post-pandemic learning recovery.

To expand accessibility, Riverside Insights partnered with Presence in September 2025 to enable remote administration of the Woodcock-Johnson^{®} V assessments, allowing schools nationwide to conduct fully digital evaluations and provide timely special education support.

== Markets ==
=== Clinical ===
The clinical side of Riverside's business focuses on providing research and test materials for practicing professionals such as clinical and school psychologists as well as Universities with psychology programs.

==== Products ====
- Batería III Woodcock-Muñoz NU
- Batería IV
- Battelle Developmental Inventory, 2nd Edition Normative Update (BDI-2 NU)
- Battelle Developmental Inventory, 2nd Edition-Spanish (BDI-2 Spanish)
- Battelle Developmental Inventory, 3rd Edition (BDI-3)
- Beery-Buktenica Developmental Test of Visual-Motor Integration (Beery VMI-5)
- Bender Visual-Motor Gestalt Test, Second Edition (Bender-Gestalt II)
- Bilingual Verbal Ability Tests, Normative Update (BVAT NU)
- Das•Naglieri Cognitive Assessment System (CAS)
- Dean-Woodcock Neuropsychological Battery (DW)
- ESGI (Educational Software for Guiding Instruction)
- ImPACT Applications
- Infant-Toddler Developmental Assessment (IDA)
- Koppitz-2
- Parents' Observations of Infants and Toddlers (POINT)
- Scales of Independent Behavior–Revised (SIB–R)
- Stanford-Binet Intelligence Scales, Fifth Edition (SB5)
- Universal Nonverbal Intelligence Test (UNIT)
- Woodcock-Johnson V (WJ V)
- Woodcock-Johnson IV (WJ IV)
- Woodcock-Johnson Tests of Early Cognitive and Academic Development (ECAD)
- Woodcock Interpretation & Instructional Interventions Program (WIIIP)
- Woodcock-Johnson III NU Brief Battery
- Woodcock-Johnson III Diagnostic Reading Battery (WJIII DRB)
- Woodcock-Johnson III NU Tests of Achievement
- Woodcock-Johnson III NU Tests of Cognitive Abilities
- Woodcock-Muñoz Language Survey –Revised
- The Sir Roger De Coverley Papers

=== K-12 Educational ===
The educational side of Riverside's business focuses on providing research and test materials for educational professionals.

==== Products ====
- Assess2Know
- Basic Early Assessment of Reading (BEAR)
- Cognitive Abilities Test (CogAT)
- DataManager
- Diagnostic Assessments of Reading, 2nd Edition (DAR)
- easyCBM
- Gates-MacGinitie Reading Tests, Fourth Edition (GMRT)
- Interactive Results Manager (iRM)
- Iowa Algebra Aptitude Test, Fifth Edition (IAAT)
- IowaFlex
- Iowa Tests of Basic Skills, Forms A, B, and C (ITBS)
- Iowa Assessments, Forms E, F, and G,
- Logramos
- Nelson-Denny Reading Test (ND)
- Qualls Early Learning Inventory (QELI)
- SkillSurfer
- Trial Teaching Strategies (TTS)
