= Avivamiento Broadcasting Network =

Avivamiento Broadcasting Network (also known as ABN) is a Colombian local religious television channel, based in Bogotá. It is owned by the Centro Mundial de Avivamiento, a Christian congregation led by pastors Ricardo Rodríguez and María Patricia Patty Rodríguez. ABN started broadcasting 21 June 2001.
