= Behavioral intelligence =

Concept in psychology

Behavioral Intelligence, often abbreviated as BI, is an individual's capacity to comprehend and impact social interactions through the perception of their own behavior and the behavior of others in various situations. It encompasses the ability to interpret, predict, and adapt one's actions based on internal and external cues. Behavioral intelligence goes beyond traditional notions of intelligence and is a vital skill in contemporary society, particularly in interpersonal and professional contexts.

Historically, psychology has primarily focused on the study of the human mind and behavior, encompassing processes such as perception, evaluation, processing, and appraisal of information, leading to various behavioral responses. Behavior is the outward manifestation of internal cognitive processes and can be triggered by both automated, unconscious processes and deliberate, conscious decisions. These behaviors are influenced by how individuals perceive their external environment and navigate within it, shaped by internal representations of the world around them.

== Importance ==
Managing self impression

The ability to manage one's self-impression is a critical component of behavioral intelligence. Impressions are formed rapidly, with judgments of traits like extraversion, trustworthiness, competence, and likability occurring within milliseconds. People make decisions about whether to cooperate with or avoid others based on these initial impressions.

Therefore, being self-aware of one's own impression and actively shaping it can facilitate positive interactions and goal attainment. Nonverbal communication, emotional regulation, and the ability to influence and control social situations are skills that hold paramount importance and are often more challenging to acquire than role-specific skills.

Reacting to other people

In the setting of a sales interaction with a sales representative and a prospect, achieving a desired outcome, i.e., closing a deal, involves a range of skills, including persuasion and negotiation. The sales representative’s personality, shaped through impression management, can significantly influence these decision-making processes. For instance, impressions of higher competence can enhance persuasion effectiveness.

== Applications ==
A number of companies are using behavioral intelligence to alleviate certain problems in different industries and academia. Behavioral intelligence platforms have also emerged to assist individuals as well as companies.
