= Neville A. Stanton =

British Professor of Human Factors

Neville A. Stanton is a British Professor Emeritus of Human Factors in Transport within Engineering and Physical Sciences at the University of Southampton. He is a Chartered Engineer (C.Eng), Chartered Psychologist (C.Psychol) and Chartered Ergonomist (C.CIEHF) and has written and edited over 60 books and over 400 peer-reviewed journal papers on applications of the subject.

Stanton is a Fellow of the British Psychological Society, a Fellow of the Chartered Institute of Ergonomics and Human Factors and a member of the Institution of Engineering and Technology. He has been published in academic journals including Nature. He has also helped organisations design new human-machine interfaces, such as the Adaptive Cruise Control system for Jaguar Cars.

Other work includes assessment of human reliability in high risk systems, evaluation of control room interfaces, layouts, work design, social organisation and environment, and product design. He teaches courses on human factors methods, User Centred Design and Usability. His research interests include situation awareness, task analysis, cognitive work analysis, human error, socio-technical systems, naturalistic decision making and human reactions in emergencies.

Stanton has been an expert witness for transport related collisions and offers expert advice to high reliability organisations.

== Authored books ==
- Stanton, N. A. and Young, M. S. (1999) A Guide to Methodology in Ergonomics: Designing for Human Use (first edition). Taylor & Francis: London.
- Stanton, N. A., Salmon, P. M., Walker, G. H., Baber, C. and Jenkins, D. (2005) Human Factors Methods: A Practical Guide for Engineering and Design. Ashgate: Aldershot.
- Stanton, N. A., Baber, C. and Harris, D. (2008) Modelling Command and Control: Event Analysis of Systemic Teamwork. Ashgate: Aldershot.
- Jenkins, D. P., Stanton, N. A., Walker, G. H. and Salmon, P. M. (2009) Cognitive Work Analysis: coping with complexity. Ashgate: Aldershot.
- Salmon, P. M., Stanton, N. A., Walker, G. H. and Jenkins, D. P. (2009) Distributed Situation Awareness. Ashgate: Aldershot.
- Stanton, N. A., Walker, G. H., Jenkins, D. P., Salmon, P. M., Revell, K and Rafferty, L. (2009) Digitising Command and Control: Human Factors and Ergonomics Analysis of Mission Planning and Battlespace Management. Ashgate: Aldershot.
- Walker G.H., Stanton N.A., Salmon P.M. and Jenkins D.P., (2009) Command and Control: The Sociotechnical Perspective. Ashgate: Aldershot, UK.
- Stanton N.A., Salmon P.M., Jenkins D.P. and Walker G.H. (2010) Human Factors in the Design and Evaluation of Central Control Room Operations. CRC Press: Boca Raton, USA.
- Lockton, D., Harrison, D.J., Stanton, N.A. (2010) Design with Intent: 101 Patterns for Influencing Behaviour Through Design v.1.0. Equifine: Windsor.
- Salmon, P, Stanton, N. A., Gibbon, A, Jenkins, D. and Walker, G. H. (2010) Human Factors Methods and Sports Science: A Practical Guide. CRC Press: London, UK.
- Salmon, P. M., Stanton, N. A., Lenné, M., Jenkins, D. P., Rafferty, L. A. and Walker, G. H. (2011) Human Factors Methods and Accident Analysis. Ashgate: Aldershot, UK.
- Rafferty, L. A., Stanton, N. A. and Walker, G. H. (2012) Human Factors of Fratricide. Ashgate: Aldershot, UK.
- Stanton, N. A., Salmon, P. M., Rafferty, L. A., Walker, G. H., Baber, C. and Jenkins, D. (2013) Human Factors Methods: A Practical Guide for Engineering and Design (second edition). Ashgate: Aldershot.
- Harvey, C. and Stanton, N. A. (2013) Usability Evaluation for In-Vehicle Systems. CRC Press: London, UK.
- Stanton, N. A., Young, M. S. and Harvey, C. (2014) A Guide to Methodology in Ergonomics: Designing for Human Use (second edition). Taylor & Francis: London.
- Griffin, T. G., Young, M. S. and Stanton, N. A. (2015) Human Factors Modelling in Aviation Accident Analysis and Prevention. Ashgate: Aldershot.
- Walker, G. H., Stanton, N. A. and Salmon, P. M. (2015) Human Factors in Automotive Engineering and Technology. Ashgate: Aldershot.
- Plant, K. L. and Stanton, N. A. (2017) Distributed Cognition and Reality: How pilots and crews make decisions. CRC Press: Boca Raton, USA.
- Revell, K. M. A. and Stanton, N. A. (2017) Mental Models: Design of User Interaction and Interfaces for Domestic Energy Systems. CRC Press: Boca Raton, USA.
- McIlroy, R. C. and Stanton, N. A. (2018) Eco-driving: from strategies to interfaces. CRC Press: Boca Raton, USA.
- Banks, V. A. and Stanton, N. A. (2017) Automobile Automation: Distributed Cognition on the Road. CRC Press: Boca Raton, USA.
- Read, G., Beanland, V., Lenne, M. Stanton, N. A. and Salmon, P. M. (2017) Integrating Human Factors Methods and Systems Thinking for Transport Analysis and Design. CRC Press: Boca Raton, USA.
- Stevens, N., Salmon P.M., Walker G.H. and Stanton N.A. (2018) Human Factors in Land Use Planning and Urban Design: Methods, Practical Guidance and Applications. CRC Press: Boca Raton, USA.
- Walker, G. H., Stanton, N. A. and Salmon, P. M. (2018) Vehicle Feedback and Driver Situation Awareness. CRC Press: Boca Raton, USA.
- Eriksson, A. and Stanton, N. A. (2018) Driver Reactions to Automated Vehicles. CRC Press: Boca Raton, USA.
- Stanton N. A., Salmon P. M. and Walker G. H. (2019) Systems Thinking in Practice: Applications of the Event Analysis of Systemic Teamwork Method. CRC Press: Boca Raton, USA.
- Salmon, P. M., Read, G. J. M., Walker, G. H., Lenne, M. G. and Stanton, N. A. (2019). Distributed Situation Awareness in Road Transport: Theory, Measurement, and Application to Intersection Design. CRC Press, Boca Raton, FL.
- Saward, J R. E. and Stanton, N. A. (2019) Individual Latent Error Detection: Making systems Safer. CRC Press: Boca Raton, USA.
- Parnell, K. J., Stanton, N. A. and Plant, K. L. (2019) Driver Distraction: A Sociotechnical Approach. CRC Press: Boca Raton, USA.
- Clark, J., Stanton, N. A. and Revell, K. M. A. (2022) Human-Automation Interaction Design: Developing a Vehicle Automation Assistant. CRC Press: Boca Raton, USA.
- Allison, C. K., Fleming, J. M., Yan, X., Lot, R. and Stanton, N. A. (2021) Assisted Eco-Driving - A practical guide to the development and testing of an Eco-Driving Assistance System (EDAS). CRC Press: Boca Raton, USA.
- Salmon, P. M., Stanton, N. A., Walker, G. H., Goode, N., Thompson, J. and Read, G. J. M. (2022) Handbook of Systems Thinking Methods. CRC Press: Boca Raton, USA.
- Parnell, K. J., Banks, V. A., Wynne, R. A., Stanton, N. A. and Plant, K. L. (2023) Human Factors on the Flight Deck: A Guide to Designing, Modelling and Evaluating. CRC Press: Boca Raton, USA.
- Young, M. S. and Stanton, N. A. (2023) Driving automation: a human factors perspective. CRC Press: Boca Raton, USA.

== Edited books ==
- Stanton, N. A. (1994) Human Factors in Alarm Design. Taylor & Francis: London.
- Stanton, N. A. (1996) Human Factors in Nuclear Safety. Taylor & Francis: London.
- Stanton, N. A. (1998) Human Factors in Consumer Products. Taylor & Francis: London.
- Stanton, N. A. and Edworthy, J. (1999) Human Factors in Auditory Warnings. Ashgate: Aldershot.
- Annett, J. and Stanton, N. A. (2000) Task Analysis. Taylor & Francis: London.
- Tabor, E.; Chappell, A.; Stanton, N. A. and Turnock, P. (2000) Exploring Design and Innovation. Design Council: London.
- Diaper, D. and Stanton, N. A. (2004) Handbook of Task Analysis in Human-Computer Interaction. Lawrence Erlbaum Associates.
- Stanton, N. A., Hedge, A., Salas, E., Hendrick, H. and Brookhaus, K. (2005) Handbook of Human Factors and Ergonomics Methods. Taylor & Francis: London.
- Stanton, N. A. (2011) Trust in Military Teams. Ashgate: Aldershot, UK.
- Karwowski, W., Soares, M. M. and Stanton, N. A. (2011) Human Factors and Ergonomics in Consumer Product Design: Methods and Techniques. CRC Press: Boca Raton, USA.
- Karwowski, W., Soares, M. M. and Stanton, N. A. (2011) Human Factors and Ergonomics in Consumer Product Design: Uses and Applications. CRC Press: Boca Raton, USA.
- Stanton, N. A. (2012) Advances in Human Aspects of Road and Rail Transportation. CRC Press: Boca Raton, USA.
- Stanton, N. A., Landry, S., Di Bucchianico, G. and Vallicelli, A. (2014) Advances in Human Aspects of Transportation – Part 1. CRC Press: Boca Raton, USA.
- Stanton, N. A., Landry, S., Di Bucchianico, G. and Vallicelli, A. (2014) Advances in Human Aspects of Transportation – Part 2. CRC Press: Boca Raton, USA.
- Stanton, N. A., Landry, S., Di Bucchianico, G. and Vallicelli, A. (2014) Advances in Human Aspects of Transportation – Part 3. CRC Press: Boca Raton, USA.
- Di Bucchianico, G., Vallicelli, A., Stanton, N. A. and Landry, S. (2017) Human Factors in Transportation: Social and Technological Evolution Across Maritime, Road, Rail, and Aviation Domains. CRC Press: Boca Raton, USA.
- Stanton, N. A., Landry, S., Di Bucchianico, G. and Vallicelli, A. (2016) Advances in Human Aspects of Transportation. Springer Verlag: Berlin.
- Stanton N. A., Salmon P. M., Walker G. H. and Jenkins D. P. (2017) Cognitive Work Analysis: Applications, Extensions and Future Directions. CRC Press: Boca Raton, USA.
- Stanton N. A. (2017) Advances in Human Aspects of Transportation. Springer Verlag: Berlin.
- Stanton N. A. (2018) Advances in Human Aspects of Transportation. Springer Verlag: Berlin.
- Stanton N. A., Salmon P. M. and Walker G. H. (2019) New Paradigms in Ergonomics. Routledge: Oxford.
- Stanton N. A. (2019) Advances in Human Aspects of Transportation. Springer Verlag: Berlin.
- Stanton N. A., Salmon P. M. and Walker G. H. (2020) New Paradigms in Ergonomics. Routledge: Oxford.
- Stanton N. A. (2020) Advances in Human Aspects of Transportation. Springer Verlag: Berlin.
- Stanton, N. A., Revell, K. M. A. and Langdon, P. (2021) Designing Interaction and Interfaces for Automated Vehicles: User-Centred Ecological Interface Design and Testing. CRC Press: Boca Raton, USA.
- Stanton N. A. (2021) Advances in Human Aspects of Transportation. Springer Verlag: Berlin.
- Duffy, V. G., Landry, S. J., Lee, J. D. and Stanton, N. A. (2023) Human-Automation Interaction: Transportation. Springer Verlag: Berlin.
