= American Board of Professional Neuropsychology =

US certification organization

American Board of Professional Neuropsychology (ABN) is a free-standing, post-doctoral level (i.e., Ph.D., Psy.D.), Diplomate granting certification board established in 1982.

== Overview ==
The mission of ABN is to establish and maintain professional standards for expertise in the practice of clinical neuropsychology. ABN recognizes that neuropsychological practitioners at large can be difficult for the lay public to evaluate a priori. The ABN, through its credentialing process, offers to the public and individuals who would have a need for clinical professional neuropsychological services, a means whereby well qualified neuropsychologists can be identified. The ABN Diplomate process involves a rigorous examination of credentials, including education and post doctoral training, a written examination, work sample review, and a two-hour oral examination.
