= Woodcock–Johnson Tests of Cognitive Abilities =

Set of intelligence tests

- Purpose: assess cognitive skills

The Woodcock–Johnson Tests of Cognitive Abilities is a set of intelligence tests first developed in 1977 by Richard Woodcock and Mary E. Bonner Johnson (although Johnson's contribution is disputed). It was revised in 1989, again in 2001, and most recently in 2014. The most recent version, WJ V, is administered digitally. They may be administered to children from age two up to the oldest adults (with norms utilizing individuals in their 90s). The previous edition WJ III was praised for covering "a wide variety of cognitive skills".

== Sections of the test ==
The Cattell–Horn–Carroll theory factors that this test examines are based on 9 broad stratum abilities. Although the test is able to produce 20 scores, only seven of these broad abilities are more commonly measured: comprehension-knowledge (Gc), fluid reasoning (Gf), short-term memory (Gsm), processing speed (Gs), auditory processing (Ga), visual-spatial ability (Gv), and long-term storage and retrieval (Glr). Comprehension-knowledge (Gc) is the ability to use previous experience, knowledge, and skills, which are valued by one’s culture, to communicate or reason in unique situations. Fluid reasoning (Gf) is defined as the ability to control one’s attention to solve novel problems, without the ability to rely on previous knowledge or schemas. Short-term memory (Gsm) is the ability to encode, maintain, and manipulate information while it is in one’s immediate consciousness. Processing speed (Gs) is the ability to execute simple and repetitive cognitive tasks rapidly and effortlessly. Auditory processing (Ga) is the ability to identify and process meaningful, nonverbal information in sound. Visual processing (Gv) is the ability to use simulated mental imagery to solve problems, and long-term storage and retrieval (Glr) is the ability to store, solidify, and then retrieve information over time.

== Published versions ==
The test is currently in its fifth edition, published by Riverside Insights. The Woodcock-Johnson III and IV are suitable for assessment of giftedness, and for referrals for special education services.
