= Cattell–Horn–Carroll theory =

Psychological theory

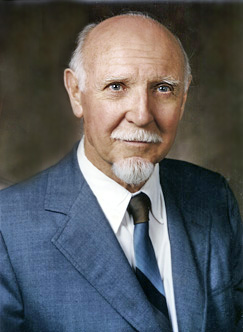
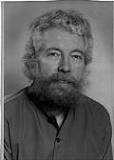
Raymond B. Cattell (left) and John L. Horn (right)

The Cattell–Horn–Carroll theory (commonly abbreviated to CHC), is a psychological theory on the structure of human cognitive abilities. Based on the work of three psychologists, Raymond B. Cattell, John L. Horn and John B. Carroll, the Cattell–Horn–Carroll theory is regarded as an important theory in the study of human intelligence. Based on a large body of research, spanning over 70 years, Carroll's Three Stratum theory was developed using the psychometric approach, the objective measurement of individual differences in abilities, and the application of factor analysis, a statistical technique which uncovers relationships between variables and the underlying structure of concepts such as 'intelligence'. The psychometric approach has consistently facilitated the development of reliable and valid measurement tools and continues to dominate the field of intelligence research.

The Cattell–Horn–Carroll theory is an integration of two previously established theoretical models of intelligence: the theory of fluid and crystallized intelligence (Gf-Gc), and Carroll's three-stratum theory, a hierarchical, three-stratum model of intelligence. Due to substantial similarities between the two theories they were amalgamated to form the Cattell–Horn–Carroll theory. However, some researchers, including John Carroll, have questioned not only the need for, but also the empirical basis of, the theory.

In the late 1990s the CHC model was expanded by McGrew, later revised with the help of Flanagan. Later extensions of the model are detailed in McGrew and Schneider and McGrew. There are a fairly large number of distinct individual differences in cognitive ability, and CHC theory holds that the relationships among them can be derived by classifying them into three different strata: stratum I, "narrow" abilities; stratum II, "broad abilities"; and stratum III, consisting of a single "general ability" (or g).

Today, the Cattell–Horn–Carroll theory is widely accepted as the most comprehensive and empirically supported theory of cognitive abilities, informing a substantial body of research and the ongoing development of IQ (Intelligence Quotient) tests.

== Background ==
=== Development of the CHC model ===
The Cattell–Horn–Carroll theory of intelligence is a synthesis of Cattell and Horn's Gf-Gc model of fluid and crystallised intelligence and Carroll's Three Stratum Hierarchy. Awareness of the similarities between Cattel and Horn's Gf-Gc expanded model abilities and Carroll's Broad Stratum II abilities were highlighted at a meeting in 1985 concerning the revision of the Woodcock-Johnson Psycho-Educational Battery. At this meeting Horn presented the Gf-Gc theory to several prominent figures in intelligence testing, including John B. Carroll. Carroll was already a vocal proponent of the Cattell-Horn theory, stating in 1993 that the Gf-Gc model "appears to offer the most well-founded and reasonable approach to an acceptable theory of the structure of cognitive abilities". This fortuitous meeting was the starting point for the integration of the two theories. The integration of the two theories evolved through a series of bridging events that occurred over two decades. Although there are many similarities between the two models, Horn consistently and unyieldingly argued against a single general ability g factor. Charles Spearman first proposed the existence of the g-factor (also known as general intelligence) in the early 20th century after discovering significant positive correlations between children's scores in seemingly unrelated academic subjects. Unlike Horn, Carroll argued that evidence for a single 'general' ability was overwhelming, and insisted that g was essential to a theory of human intelligence.

==== Cattell and Horn's Gf–Gc Model ====
Raymond B. Cattell (20 March 1905 – 2 February 1998) was the first to propose a distinction between "fluid intelligence" (Gf) and "crystallised intelligence" (Gc). Charles Spearman's s factors are considered a prequel to this idea, along with Thurstone's theory of Primary Mental Abilities. By 1991, John Horn, a student of Cattell's, had expanded the Gf-Gc model to include 9 or 10 broad abilities.

Fluid intelligence refers to quantitative reasoning, processing ability, adaptability to new environments and novel problem solving. Crystallised intelligence (Gc) refers to the accumulation of knowledge (general, procedural and declarative). Gc tasks include problem solving with familiar materials and culture-fair tests of general knowledge and vocabulary. Gf and Gc are both factors of g (general intelligence). Though distinct, there is interaction, as fluid intelligence is a determining factor in the speed with which crystallised knowledge is accumulated. Crystallised intelligence is known to increase with age as we accumulate knowledge throughout the lifespan. Fluid processing ability reaches a peak around age 20, then declines steadily. Recent research has explored the idea that training on working memory tasks can transfer to improvements in fluid intelligence. This idea did not hold under further scrutiny.

===== Carroll's three-stratum hierarchy =====
The American psychologist John B. Carroll (June 5, 1916 – July 1, 2003) made substantial contributions to psychology, psychometrics and educational linguistics. In 1993, Carroll published Human Cognitive Abilities: A Survey of Factor-Analytic Studies, in which he presented 'A Theory of Cognitive Abilities: The Three-Stratum Theory'. Carroll had re-analysed data-sets from 461 classic factor analytic studies of human cognition, distilling the results into 800 pages, thus providing a solid foundation for future research in human intelligence.

Carroll's three-stratum theory presented three levels of cognition: narrow abilities (stratum I), broad abilities (stratum II) and general abilities (stratum III).

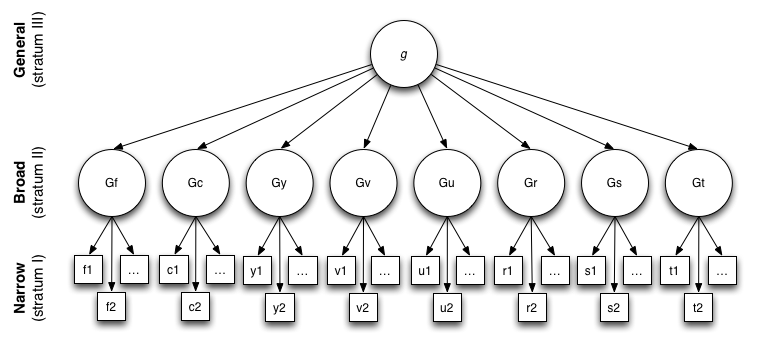
Carroll's Three Stratum Model of Human Intelligence: General intelligence (g) fluid intelligence (Gf), crystallized intelligence (Gc), general memory and learning (Gy), broad visual perception (Gv), broad auditory perception (Gu), broad retrieval ability (Gr), broad cognitive speediness (Gs), and processing speed (Gt).

== Abilities ==
=== Broad and narrow abilities ===
The broad abilities are:

- Comprehension-Knowledge (Gc): includes the breadth and depth of a person's acquired knowledge, the ability to communicate one's knowledge, and the ability to reason using previously learned experiences or procedures.
- Fluid reasoning (Gf): includes the broad ability to reason, form concepts, and solve problems using unfamiliar information or novel procedures.
- Quantitative knowledge (Gq): is the ability to comprehend quantitative concepts and relationships and to manipulate numerical symbols.
- Reading & Writing Ability (Grw): includes basic reading and writing skills.
- Short-Term Memory (Gsm): is the ability to apprehend and hold information in immediate awareness and then use it within a few seconds.
- Long-Term Storage and Retrieval (Glr): is the ability to store information and fluently retrieve it later in the process of thinking.
- Visual Processing (Gv): is the ability to perceive, analyze, synthesize, and think with visual patterns, including the ability to store and recall visual representations.
- Auditory Processing (Ga): is the ability to analyze, synthesize, and discriminate auditory stimuli, including the ability to process and discriminate speech sounds that may be presented under distorted conditions.
- Processing Speed (Gs): is the ability to perform automatic cognitive tasks, particularly when measured under pressure to maintain focused attention.

A tenth ability, Decision/Reaction Time/Speed (Gt), is considered part of the theory, but is not currently assessed by any major intellectual ability test, although it can be assessed with a supplemental measure such as a continuous performance test.

- Decision/Reaction Time/Speed (Gt): reflects the immediacy with which an individual can react to stimuli or a task (typically measured in seconds or fractions of seconds; not to be confused with Gs, which typically is measured in intervals of 2–3 minutes).

McGrew proposes a number of extensions to CHC theory, including Domain-specific knowledge (Gkn), Psychomotor ability (Gp), and Psychomotor speed (Gps). In addition, additional sensory processing abilities are proposed, including tactile (Gh), kinesthetic (Gk), and olfactory (Go).

== Model tests ==
Many tests of cognitive ability have been classified using the CHC model and are described in The Intelligence Test Desk Reference (ITDR). CHC theory is particularly relevant to school psychologists for psychoeducational assessment. 5 of the 7 major tests of intelligence have changed to incorporate CHC theory as their foundation for specifying and operationalizing cognitive abilities/processes. Since even all modern intellectual test instruments fail to effectively measure all 10 broad stratum abilities an alternative method of cognitive assessment and interpretation called Cross Battery Assessment (XBA) was developed. However, the veracity of this approach to assessment and interpretation has been criticized in the research literature as statistically flawed.

== Other related issues ==
Consistent with the evolving nature of the theory, the Cattell-Horn-Carroll framework remains "an open-ended empirical theory to which future tests of as yet unmeasured or unknown abilities could possibly result in additional factors at one or more levels in Carroll's hierarchy". There is still some debate on the broad (stratum II) abilities, and the narrow (stratum I) abilities, and these remain open for refinement.

MacCallum highlighted the need to recognize the limitations of artificial measurement tools built upon mathematical models: "Simply put, our models are implausible if taken as exact or literal representations of real world phenomena. They cannot capture the complexity of the real world which they purport to represent. At best, they can provide an approximation of the real world that has some substantive meaning and some utility."

== See also ==
- Fluid and crystallized intelligence for Gf-Gc theory
