= Rudolph G. Tenerowicz =

American politician

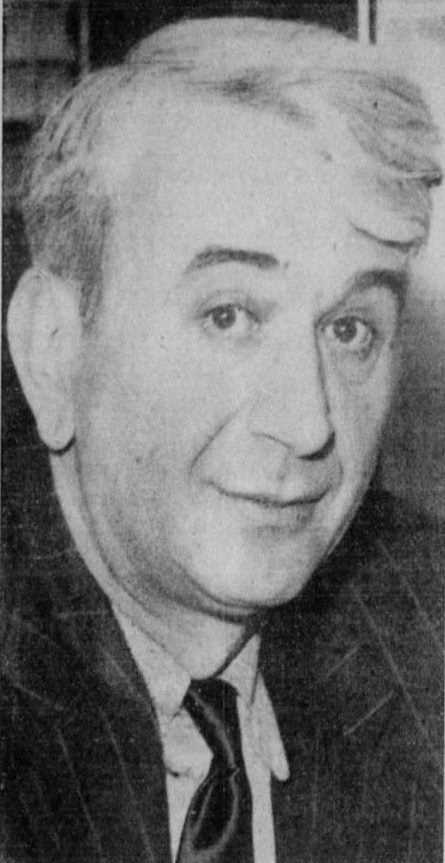
- Detroit Free Press, June 7, 1942

Member of the U.S. House of Representatives from Michigan's 1st district
- In office January 3, 1939 – January 3, 1943
- Preceded by: George G. Sadowski
- Succeeded by: George G. Sadowski

Personal details
- Born: Rudolph Gabriel Tenerowicz; June 14, 1890 Budapest, Austria-Hungary
- Died: August 31, 1963 (aged 73) Hamtramck, Michigan, U.S.
- Resting place: Arlington National Cemetery
- Party: elected as Democratic switched to Republican Party after leaving office
- Spouse: Margaret Agnes McGuire
- Education: St. Bonaventure University; Loyola University Chicago
- Occupation: Physician

Rudolph Gabriel Tenerowicz (June 14, 1890 – August 31, 1963) was an American physician and politician from the U.S. state of Michigan. He served two terms in the United States House of Representatives from 1939 to 1943.

== Early life ==
Tenerowicz was born in 1890 in Budapest (then a part of the Austro-Hungarian Empire). His parents, John (a Polish diplomat in Hungary) and Antoinette (Gall) Tenerowicz, immigrated with their family to the United States in 1892 and settled in Adrian, Armstrong County, Pennsylvania. Tenerowicz had five siblings: Sr. Mary (Tenerowicz) Bernadine C.S.S.F Felician order, Edward Tenerowicz, Stanley Tenerowicz, Anthony Tenerowicz, and Caroline (Tenerowicz) Osikowicz.

He attended the parochial schools in Adrian, SS. Cyril and Methodius Seminary in Orchard Lake, Michigan; St. Bonaventure's College (Now St. Bonaventure University) in Allegany, New York; and St. Ignatius College (now known as Loyola University Chicago) in Chicago, Illinois. He graduated in medicine from the Chicago College of Medicine and Surgery (now the Stritch School of Medicine) in 1912, and practiced medicine in Chicago from 1912 to 1923.

During World War I, Tenerowicz served from September 10, 1917, as a first lieutenant in the Medical Corps of the United States Army until his discharge on December 26, 1918. He was captain in the Medical Reserve Corps from 1919 to 1934. He received a postgraduate course in surgery at Illinois Post Graduate School at Chicago. He moved to Hamtramck, Michigan, in 1923 and continued the practice of medicine.

== Politics ==
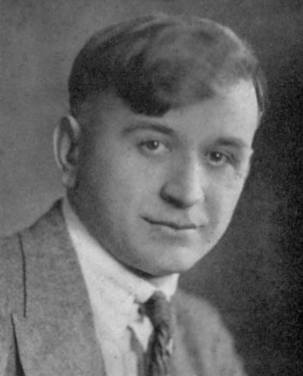
c. 1922

Tenerowicz served as mayor of Hamtramck from 1928 to 1932. In 1931, Tenerowicz and twelve others, including two named Jacob Kaplan and Isaac Levey, were indicted for bribery. He was tried and convicted on vice conspiracy charges and freed from prison when pardoned by Democratic Governor William A. Comstock. Despite the conviction, Tenerowicz returned to serve as mayor from 1936 to 1938. He was member of the Wayne County Board of Supervisors for seven years.

While serving as Mayor, and in an effort to eliminate youth crime in the City of Hamtramck, Tenerowicz worked with Mrs. Jean Hoxie to implement a tennis programs to keep kids off the streets. Kids who participated in the tennis program were offered a meal at the end of the day for their efforts. The program was an overwhelming success and resulted in Michigan tennis champions at local, state and national levels, while reducing juvenile crime.

According to Richard Rothstein's 2017 book, The Color of Law, Tenerowicz, "persuaded his colleagues that funding for the agency (Federal Works Agency) should be cut off unless (Clark) Foreman was fired and the Sojourner Truth units were assigned only to whites." (pg. 26) Rothstein adds, "The director of the Federal Housing Authority supported Tenerowicz, stating that the presence of African Americans in the area would threaten property values of nearby residents. Foreman was forced to resign. The Federal Works Agency then prepared a different project for African Americans on a plot that the Detroit Housing Commission recommended, in an industrial area deemed unsuitable for whites."

In 1938, Tenerowicz was elected, without challenge, as a Democrat from Michigan's 1st congressional district to the Seventy-sixth Congress and reelected in 1938 to the Seventy-seventh, serving from January 3, 1939, to January 3, 1943. He was an unsuccessful candidate for renomination in 1942 and for election as a Republican in 1946, 1948, 1950, 1952, and 1954.

== Family ==
In 1937, Tenerowicz married Margaret Agnes McGuire in Bowling Green Ohio. They had one child together, John Francis Tenerowicz of Hilton Head, SC, and a blended family with Margaret's children from a previous marriage, Marjorie Kanterman Paynter of Dearborn, Michigan, and William G. Tenerowicz, of Great Falls Virginia, and 12 grandchildren.

== Retirement and death ==
Rudolph Gabriel Tenerowicz resumed practice in Hamtramck, Michigan.

Rudolph died at the age of 73, on August 31, 1963, at St. Francis Hospital in Hamtramck, and was buried in Arlington National Cemetery.

Margaret, his wife, died at the age of 88 in Howell, Michigan, and was buried with her husband Rudolph in Arlington National Cemetery.

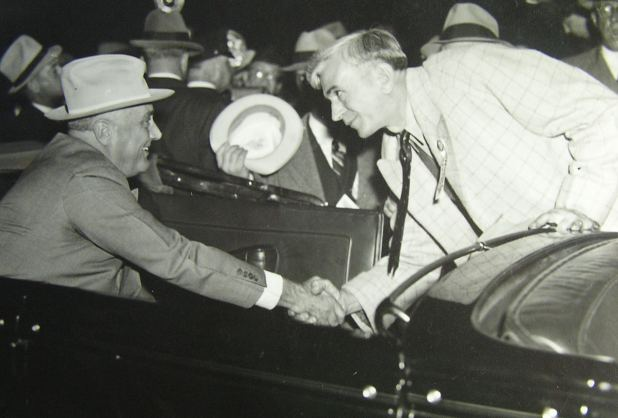
Rudolph Gabriel Tenerowicz with President Roosevelt in Hamtramck, Michigan

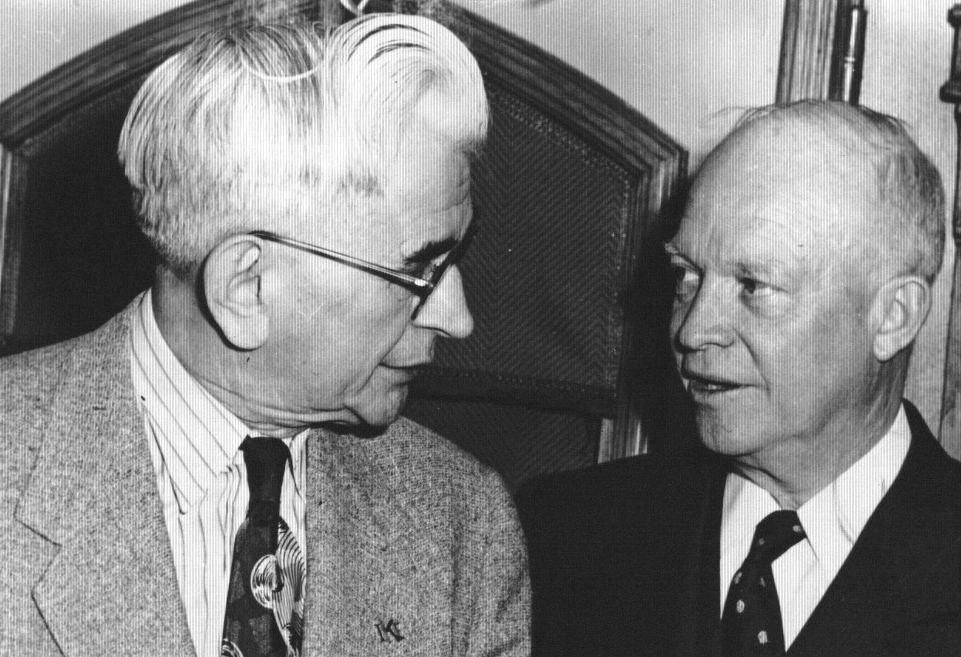
Rudolph Gabriel Tenerowicz with President Eisenhower

U.S. House of Representatives
| Preceded by George G. Sadowski | United States Representative for the 1st congressional district of Michigan; 1939– 1943 | Succeeded by George G. Sadowski |
