= LIFO (education) =

Last in First Out termination policy in education

Last in First Out (LIFO, or otherwise known as "Last One Hired is the First One Fired") is a policy often used by school districts and other employers to prioritize layoffs by seniority. Under LIFO layoff rules, junior teachers and other employees lose their jobs before senior ones. Laying off junior employees first is not exclusive to the education sector or to the United States, but is perhaps most controversial there. LIFO's proponents claim that it protects teachers with tenure and gives them job stability, and that it is an easily administered way of accomplishing layoffs following a budget cut. LIFO's critics respond that it is bad for students. They prefer that the best teachers remain regardless of how long they have been teaching.

LIFO and tenure were originally intended to provide college professors with academic freedom and ensure that they could research topics of their own choosing. In the K–12 sector, tenure was introduced to lower high teacher turnover rates. In 1932, over 20% of teachers were dismissed due to personal disagreements and difference of opinion. By 2010, LIFO was criticized on grounds that "seniority based layoffs result in promising, inexperienced teachers losing their positions, while their less effective, but more senior, peers continue to teach." As of early 2014, two states provided that seniority could not be considered when deciding which teachers to lay off, 18 states and the District of Columbia left the layoff criteria to school district discretion, 20 states provided that seniority could be considered among other factors, and 10 states provided that seniority was the sole factor, or one that had to be considered.

== Effects of seniority-prioritized layoffs ==
LIFO has a more severe impact in poor or high minority schools, since those schools tend to have newer and less experienced teachers. In schools where 34% or less of the students receive Free and Reduced meals, more than 82% of teachers have 4 or more years of experience. However, in schools where more than 75% of the student body receives Free and Reduced meals, only 77% of the teachers have more than 4 years of experience. Moreover, in California, it was seen that in schools in the lowest quartile of minority students, only 8 of every 100 teachers had two or less years of teaching whereas in schools with the highest quartile of minority students, 13 of every 100 teachers had two or less years of teaching, meaning that under LIFO-based layoffs, schools with larger minority populations would lose 60% more teachers. Finally, teachers in high need areas, such as secondary math and special education, are often less experienced due to the difficulty of recruiting these positions, and districts who adhere strictly to seniority based systems for layoffs face the added burden of recruiting teachers in these areas. In Los Angeles, it was noted that of the hundreds of promising new teachers cut in from the district in 2010 due to LIFO, 190 were in the top fifth overall of teachers in raising math and reading scores.

Research indicates that the effectiveness of teachers does not change after the first few years in the classroom. As a result, the implications of using LIFO rules for layoffs instead of basing layoffs on classroom effectiveness appear huge. With LIFO, more teachers must be dismissed to meet budgetary targets than with effectiveness-based layoffs because the youngest teachers are the least paid, but the teachers dismissed under the LIFO policy are only slightly below average in effectiveness. An effectiveness-based policy on the other hand leads to dramatic improvements in average teacher quality, and these improvements have lasting effects on students throughout their lives.

== LIFO and value-added economic modeling ==
In many states, tenure is given to teachers after 3 years, without much indication of job performance. A value added model (VAM) could be used in tenure decisions for teachers in order to estimate teacher quality. A VAM would predict how well a teacher would do based on his or her previous experience teaching. Data shows that the VAM based on standardized test scores, is a better indicator of teacher performance than any observable attributes. In using a VAM to evaluate teachers for a tenure decision, school districts can ensure that the teachers they retain (and the teachers who in turn become the most senior) are effective educators, thereby eliminating some of the discrepancy between LIFO and performance-based layoffs.

== Controversy and the overhaul of LIFO ==
Since less experienced teachers typically have lower salaries, it is estimated that if districts in the United States cut 5% of their budget through seniority based layoffs, approximately 79,000 more teachers would lose their jobs versus seniority neutral layoffs.

In a survey of New York State parents regarding teacher quality versus seniority, voters said they did not care how long a teacher had taught so long as the teacher was effective and produced good results.

Starting with Arizona in 2009, certain states and districts have been passing laws which prohibit seniority from being the deciding factor in layoff decisions. Maine, Louisiana, and District of Columbia use multiple criteria in determining layoffs, and numerous other states are trending towards performance based over seniority based layoffs.

Michelle Rhee, the former Chancellor of Washington, D.C. public schools, opposes the Last in First Out policy, instead suggesting performance based evaluation to determine layoffs. As Chancellor, she introduced the IMPACT evaluation for teachers, which measured teacher performance and was the primary factor for layoffs. She is the CEO of Students First, a grassroots movement "designed to mobilize parents, teacher, students, and administrators, and citizens" to demand a better American education system. Since its founding in 2010, Studentsfirst has been behind legislation across the country which promotes alternative teacher quality assessment methods through its "Save Great Teachers" Campaign. Victories from this campaign have been seen in Florida, Utah, Michigan, Nevada and Tennessee.

The 2014 court case of Vergara v. California struck down California's LIFO layoff rules as having a disproportionately negative impact on poor and minority public school students, thus violating the California Constitution. The Vergara trial judge noted that teacher layoffs prioritized solely by seniority prevented senior and ineffective teachers from being laid off before junior but effective teachers. In this situation, "[n]o matter how gifted the junior teacher, and no matter how grossly ineffective the senior teacher, the junior gifted one . . . is separated from [the students] and a senior grossly ineffective one . . . is left in place." The judge concluded that "[t]he logic of [this scheme] is unfathomable and therefore constitutionally unsupportable."

== See also ==
- Academic careerism
- Layoff
- Publish or perish
- StudentsFirst
- Value-added modeling
