= Vergara v. California =

2012 California state court case

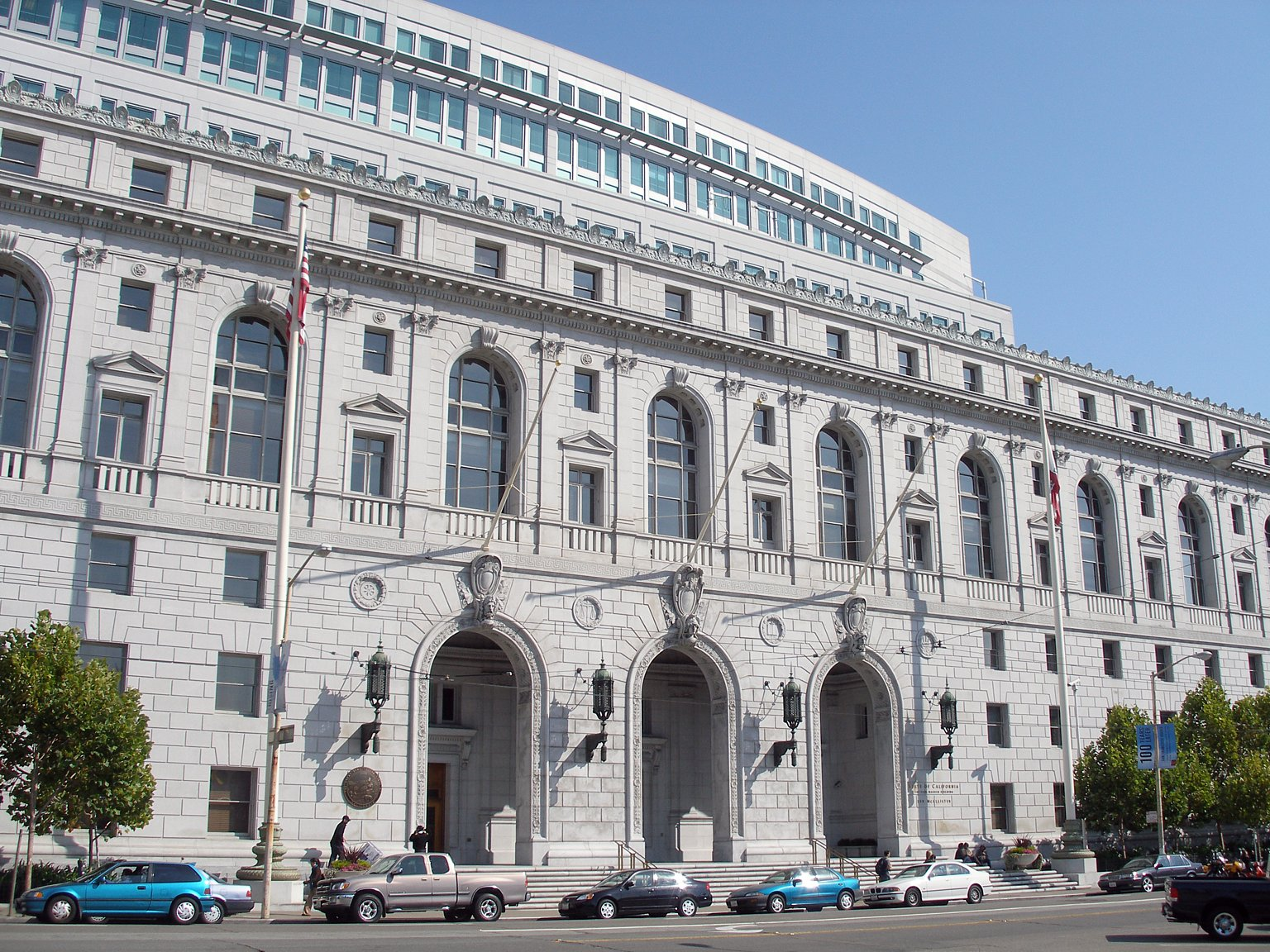
- Court: California Courts of Appeal
- Decided: April 14, 2016
- Citations: 246 Cal. App. 4th 619; Docket No. B258589S (Cal. Ct. App. 2016)

Vergara v. California was a lawsuit in the California state courts which dealt with a child's right to education and to instruction by effective teachers. The suit was filed in May 2012 by lawyers on behalf of nine California public school student plaintiffs. It alleged that several California statutes on teacher tenure, layoffs, and dismissal violated the Constitution of California by retaining some "grossly ineffective" teachers and thus denying equal protection to students assigned to the teachers. Furthermore, according to the complaint, the statutes had a disparate impact on poor and minority students, who were more likely to be assigned to a grossly-ineffective teacher.

On June 10, 2014, after a two-month trial, Judge Rolf M. Treu of the California Superior Court ruled that all of the statutes challenged by the student plaintiffs were unconstitutional; the ruling was finalized in August 2014. On April 14, 2016, a three judge panel on the Court of Appeal reversed the trial court's decision and held that the challenged statutes did not violate the California Constitution. In May 2016, lawyers for the school students asked the California Supreme Court to reconsider the Court of Appeal reversal and reinstate the trial court's ruling in their favor. On August 22, 2016, the State's highest court declined to review the case in a 4-3 decision, thus permitting the Court of Appeal decision upholding the statutes to stand.

== The challenged statutes ==
The lawsuit identified five separate statutes that kept ineffective teachers in the classroom. The argument by the student plaintiffs in the lawsuit was that tenure decisions had to be made too quickly, and that once tenure was granted it was too difficult to remove a teacher if a mistake had been made in granting tenure. The presence of ineffective teachers necessarily meant that some students were denied their constitutional right to a quality education. The defendants argued that it was possible to remove bad teachers and that these laws did not cause bad teachers to be in the schools.

=== Permanent Employment ("Tenure") statute ===
Certain provisions of the California Education Code conferred "permanent employment" status (or tenure) on any teacher who had not been informed that his or her teaching contract had been canceled by March of the second year of teaching. Permanent status required school districts to follow specific evidentiary and procedural requirements before firing a teacher. Lawyers for teachers unions in Vergara argued that this was not equivalent to lifetime employment, but instead just recognition of the due process requirements that would have to be satisfied even if teachers were to be fired for any one of a number of specified reasons.

=== Dismissal statutes ===
A series of three statutes in California specified a series of procedural requirements that had to be satisfied if a tenured teacher was to be dismissed. These requirements, the plaintiffs argued, put undue cost on districts if they wished to remove a teacher. They were also considerably beyond the normal due process rights for other civil servants in California. John Deasy, Superintendent of the Los Angeles Unified School District (LAUSD), testified that the statutes harmed students.

=== Last In, First Out ("LIFO") layoff statute ===
The final challenged statute dictates how district administrators prioritize which teachers are to be laid off if they were to reduce the size of their teaching staff. The California law required strict application of last in first out, or LIFO. With a few exceptions, before any tenured teacher could be laid off, the district had to remove all of the more junior, nontenured teachers. According to LIFO, it is impermissible to use information about teacher effectiveness in making layoff decisions.

== The trial court decision: the challenged statutes "shock the conscience" ==
On June 10, 2014, the court ruled that the statutes at issue produced disparities that "shock the conscience" and violate the equal protection clause of the California Constitution.

As background, the court began the Vergara opinion with a discussion of the U.S. Supreme Court case of Brown v. Board of Education (1954) and the California Supreme Court cases of Serrano v. Priest I (1971), Serrano v. Priest II (1976), and Butt v. State of California (1992). "While these cases addressed the issue of a lack of equality of educational opportunity . . . here this Court is directly faced with issues that compel it to apply these constitutional principles to the quality of the educational experience."

The court examined the challenged California statutes under strict scrutiny judicial review.

=== Evidence regarding teacher effectiveness ===
School administrators asked the judge to review a copy of "California Standards for the Teaching Profession" (2009 Edition) as evidence. The court pointed out that the opening sentence of those Standards state: "A growing body of research confirms that the quality of teaching is what matters most for the students' development and learning in schools." (Emphasis added by the court).

"Based on a 4 year study, Dr. [Thomas] Kane testified that students in LAUSD [the Los Angeles Unified School District] who are taught by a teacher in the bottom 5% of competence lose 9.54 months of learning in a single year compared to students with average teachers."

"Dr. [David] Berliner, an expert called by [California school administrators], testified that 1 - 3% of teachers in California are grossly ineffective. Given that the evidence showed roughly 275,000 active teachers in this state, the extrapolated number of grossly ineffective teachers ranges from 2,750 to 8,250."

=== A tenure period of less than two years was insufficient ===
The court found that California's tenure period was actually less than the two-year period ostensibly outlined in the statute. This was because a tenure decision had to be made in March, before the end of a new teacher's second school year. In contrast, the credentialing induction period for new teachers lasted two full school years. "Thus, a teacher reelected [for tenure] in March may not be recommended for credentialing after the close of the induction program in May, leaving the applicable district with a non-credentialed teacher with tenure."

"There was extensive evidence presented, including some from [school administrators that the tenure statute did not] provide nearly enough time for an informed decision to be made regarding the decision of tenure (critical for both students and teachers)."

Jesse Rothstein and David Berliner were experts who testified for the defendant school officials during the trial. Both stated that two years was not the optimal amount of time needed to make a tenure decision. Three years to five years was instead suggested as a better time frame to make the tenure decision for the mutual benefit of students and teachers.

Surveying tenure periods in other U.S. states, the court found that as of the trial (January 27 to March 27, 2014) 4 states had no tenure system at all, 9 states had tenure periods of four to five years, 32 had a three-year period, and 5 (including California) had a period of two years or less.

=== Firing a teacher in California was too expensive and time consuming ===
Lawyers for the plaintiff school students alleged that it was "too time consuming and too expensive to go through the dismissal process as required by the Dismissal Statutes to rid school districts of grossly ineffective teachers." The court agreed, concluding that "such time and cost constraints cause districts in many cases to be very reluctant to even commence dismissal procedures."

The court noted that school administrators and teachers unions had raised "the entirely legitimate issue" of protecting a teacher's due process rights when she or he was faced with the possibility of being fired. However, the court decided that "given the evidence . . . the Dismissal Statutes present the issue of uber due process."

"This Court is confident that the independent judiciary of this state is no less dedicated to the protection of reasonable due process rights of teachers than it is of protecting the rights of children to constitutionally mandated equal education opportunities."

=== Teacher layoffs prioritized solely by seniority harm students ===
California's LIFO-only layoff statute required "the last-hired teacher [to be] the statutorily-mandated first-fired one when lay-offs occur."

The statute did not contain "an exception or waiver based on teacher effectiveness."

"No matter how gifted the junior teacher, and no matter how grossly ineffective the senior teacher, the junior gifted one . . . is separated from [the students] and a senior grossly ineffective one . . . is left in place."

"The logic of [this statutory scheme] is unfathomable and therefore constitutionally unsupportable."

Surveying layoff rules for teachers in other U.S. jurisdictions, the court found that as of the trial (January 27 to March 27, 2014) 2 states provided that seniority could not be considered; 18 states and the District of Columbia left the layoff criteria to school district discretion; 20 states provided that seniority could be considered among other factors; and 10 states (including California) provided that seniority was the sole factor, or one that had to be considered.

=== Funding, experts and attorneys at the trial court level ===
Funding for the plaintiff school students was provided by David Welch, a Silicon Valley entrepreneur. Welch is the founder of a nonprofit education reform organization called Students Matter through which the plaintiffs' attorney's fees were paid.

The plaintiff school students' trial experts included a group of economists who examined various aspects of teacher effectiveness under "value-added modeling". The original complaint was built on the analyses of teacher effectiveness and the estimated economic cost of ineffective teachers by Eric Hanushek of Stanford University. Raj Chetty (Harvard University) and Thomas Kane (Harvard University) testified on the distribution of ineffective teachers in California and particularly in Los Angeles. Dan Goldhaber (University of Washington) testified on the impact of LIFO layoff statutes. Plaintiff rebuttal testimony was provided by Eric Hanushek and by Dr. Anthony Smith, former superintendent of the Oakland Unified School District.

Other expert witnesses during the trial included Linda Darling Hammond (Stanford University), David Berliner (Arizona State University), and Susan Moore Johnson (Harvard University), who testified on their understanding of the problems of tenure and of the impact of ineffective teachers. Jesse Rothstein of the University of California, Berkeley, testified that tenure restrictions served the interest of student achievement.

The school students were represented by the Gibson Dunn law firm. The defense for school administrators was provided by the California Attorney General. The California Teachers Association intervened on the side of the defense and was represented by Altschuler Berzon.

== The appeals court reversal: the challenged statutes are constitutional ==
Soon after the trial court's ruling was issued it was appealed by California Governor Jerry Brown, who reasoned that "[c]hanges of this magnitude, as a matter of law and policy, require appellate review." The case was heard on February 25, 2016, by the California Court of Appeal, Second Appellate District, Division Two. On April 14, 2016, the Court of Appeal's three judge panel unanimously overturned the trial court's ruling, finding that the attorneys for the plaintiff school students "failed to show that the statutes themselves make any certain group of students more likely to be taught by ineffective teachers than any other group of students," and that the job of the appellate judges was "merely to determine whether the statutes are constitutional, not if they are 'a good idea.'" Instead of focusing on the statutes alone, the Court of Appeal found that "[t]he evidence . . . revealed deplorable staffing decisions being made by some local administrators that have a deleterious impact on poor and minority students."

== The California Supreme Court's refusal to review the case ==
Attorneys for the student plaintiffs asked the California Supreme Court to reconsider the Court of Appeal's reversal, however, on August 22, 2016, California's highest court declined to review the case in a 4–3 split decision, thereby upholding the challenged statutes. The four justice majority which denied review did so without comment, other than issuing a standard statement that "an order denying review represents only a determination that, for whatever reason, a grant of review is not appropriate at the time of the order."

Two out of the three justices who disagreed with the decision to deny review submitted dissenting statements outlining why they believed the Court of Appeal decision should have been re-examined. Justice Goodwin Liu wrote, "[a]s the state's highest court, we owe the . . . schoolchildren throughout California, our transparent and reasoned judgment on whether the challenged statutes deprive a significant subset of students of their fundamental right to education and violate the constitutional guarantee of equal protection of the laws." Additionally, Justice Mariano-Florentino Cuéllar wrote that he and his fellow justices should have had the opportunity to determine if the flaws highlighted in the Vergara case amounted only to "the usual blemishes in governance left as institutions implement statutes or engage in routine trade-offs [or if they were] staggering failures that threaten to turn the right to education for California schoolchildren into an empty promise."

== Implications ==
The day after the Vergara trial court decision in June 2014, the Associated Press described it in a USA Today article as "a landmark decision that could influence the gathering debate over tenure across the country."

Officials from the teachers' union criticized the trial court's decision, saying that insufficient evidence was provided by the plaintiffs to show that the statutes being challenged were harmful for students, and further that the court "blatantly ignored" evidence to the contrary, saying that in actuality, the laws improve public education. They further criticized the decision for "intrud[ing] on an inherently legislative function."

On July 3, 2014, a similar lawsuit modeled on the Vergara case, Davids v. New York, was filed in New York State. And, on April 13, 2016, another lawsuit was filed in Minnesota which challenged teacher tenure rules and layoff procedures giving preference to more senior teachers.

An article published in the Washington Post on April 14, 2016, said that the Court of Appeal's decision reversing the trial court handed "a major victory to teachers unions." A subsequent report on National Public Radio used similar language (albeit limited to California) when discussing the California Supreme Court's refusal to review the appellate decision, calling the denial of review "a major victory for teachers unions in California."

California's two largest teachers unions issued triumphant press releases after the California Supreme Court precluded further state court review. The president of the NEA-affiliated California Teachers Association called Vergara a "case brought by wealthy anti-public education millionaires who spent millions of dollars to bypass voters, parents, and the legislature in an attempt to impose their harmful education agenda on local schools." The president of the California Federation of Teachers (the AFT's California affiliate) blamed the Vergara lawsuit for fostering a teacher shortage in the state, and then said, "[w]e can now turn closer attention to solving the actual problems we confront in our schools, such as securing adequate funding . . . reducing class sizes, promoting and strengthening peer assistance and review, and reinforcing collaborative district practices with a proven record of success."

== Possible pivot to the California State Legislature ==
When the trial court judge determined that the tenure, dismissal and layoff statutes were unconstitutional, he also conceded that "it is not the function of this Court to dictate or even to advise the legislature . . . how to replace the Challenged Statutes." After the California Supreme Court's denial of review effectively upheld the validity of those same statutes, the leaders of the Students Matter group that initiated and funded the lawsuit signaled that the next battles might be legislative: "The Supreme Court’s decision places the responsibility for improving the state’s teacher retention, evaluation and dismissal laws squarely with the California Legislature. And that’s where we intend to take this fight."

Many proponents from both sides of the dispute agreed that the legislature, and not the courts, was the appropriate venue for further deliberation to take place. Assistant professor in public policy at the University of Massachusetts Dartmouth Mark Paige said of the state court's decision, "This was an appropriate move by the Supreme Court and really a victory for the idea of a separation of powers as it relates to education-policy matters." He continued, "The trial court decision was an example of an activist court. The opinion lodged the trial court in the middle of a policy matter."

In the days after the California Supreme Court denied review, leading newspapers in California's two largest metropolitan areas (Los Angeles and San Francisco) published editorials which called on the state's legislature and teachers unions to address the issues raised in the Vergara case. The Los Angeles Times acknowledged that labor statutes protecting teachers may not be the most significant contributors to the educational difficulties encountered by California's students. Nonetheless, the Times Editorial Board concluded that "California’s tenure and seniority laws do tend to protect the worst teachers at the expense of students. The Legislature, always too obliging to the desires of the teachers unions, must gather its strength on behalf of the state’s children to reform bad laws." The San Francisco Chronicle also reproved California's teachers unions for keeping "profoundly rigid rules that protect incompetent classroom instructors and harm low-income students." Like the Times, the editors at the Chronicle asserted that it should be "the Legislature [that overhauls] the tenure rules," but they also noted that "teacher groups are among California’s biggest political spenders and have gutted past efforts at addressing these educational inequities."
