= Murakawa =

Murakawa (written: 村川 lit. "village river") is a Japanese surname. Notable people with the surname include:

- Daisuke Murakawa (村川 大介, born 1990), Japanese Go player
- Eri Murakawa (村川 絵梨, born 1987), Japanese actress
- Naomi Murakawa, American political scientist
- Toru Murakawa (村川 透, born 1931), Japanese film director
- Yasutoshi Murakawa (村川 康敏, born 1971), Japanese screenwriter
