= Advanced Skills Teacher =

Advanced Skills Teacher was a role in a maintained school in England and Wales from 1998 to 2013. Advanced Skills Teachers were judged through external assessment against a range of criteria to demonstrate excellent classroom teaching practice. They were employed in Advanced Skills Teacher posts in roles which include an element of work dedicated to supporting teaching colleagues in their own schools, and other schools in the area, to improve their own practice. The role was introduced in 1998 to reward excellent teachers who chose to stay working in classrooms, rather than following other routes to promotion through leadership. Funding for the role was wound down in 2011 and ceased altogether in 2013.

== Introduction of the role ==
The Labour party manifesto for the general election of 1997 included a statement that they would "create a new grade of teachers to recognise the best." The intention was to ensure that teachers who excelled in the classroom were given both financial incentive and career-path options to allow them to continue in that role, providing a role model of high-quality teaching.

Following its election in May of that year, the new government brought forward the white paper, Excellence in Schools, which outlined proposals for the new grade of teacher. The then Secretary of State for Education and Employment, David Blunkett, released additional details about the nature and pay relating to the posts in March 1998. In July of that year, regulations were put in place to provide funding for the role, with the grade being formally introduced from September 1998.

== Responsibilities of the role ==
Advanced Skills Teachers (ASTs) were given additional non-teaching time to allow them to share their teaching skills with colleagues both within their own school, and in other schools in the local area. This time normally amounts to a minimum 20% of the working week. In this time, ASTs were expected to undertake a range of tasks related to the raising of standards of teaching and learning in classrooms. These include, although are not limited to:

- supporting colleagues who are failing to meet high standards
- advising colleagues on pedagogical matters
- providing 'model' lessons to demonstrate excellent practice
- supporting the induction of new teachers
- leading professional development of teachers.

It is expected that a considerable amount of this work will be undertaken in schools other than the teacher's own school as part of outreach schemes. This may involve working in liaison with the Local Education Authority.

== Assessment and appointment ==
To become an Advanced Skills Teacher, a qualified teacher must first be assessed as meeting the professional standards of the role. In addition, they must be appointed to a specially-created Advanced Skills Teacher post.

In order to be assessed as an AST, a teacher must demonstrate that they are able to meet the professional standards for the role. There are three stated standards relating to the role of AST, but in addition, applicants must also meet the subsumed standards of an Excellent teacher - a separate role as defined by government policy. There are a total of 28 standards to be met, falling under three main categories:

- Professional attributes
- Professional knowledge and understanding
- Professional skills

Teachers applying for AST posts must meet an external assessor who will judge the postholder against the criteria before being appointed to the post.

== Pay and conditions ==
When the role of AST was first introduced, it was accompanied by a 27-point pay scale separate from that of classroom teachers or school managers. In its review of school teachers' pay in 2004, the School Teachers' Review Body recommended a change to the scale with effect from September 2006. Since that time, Advanced Skills Teachers have been paid on a scale of 18 pay points, which is identical to the first 18 points range of the Leadership pay scale, which is used for Head teachers, and Deputy and Assistant Headteachers.

Unlike teachers employed on the main pay scale, Advanced Skills Teachers were not subject to the limits on working time of 195 days per academic year, or 1265 directed hours per year. Head teachers are, however, required to ensure that Advanced Skills Teachers have a reasonable work/life balance.

== See also ==
- Teacher quality assessment
