= Eric Hanushek =

American economist (born 1943)

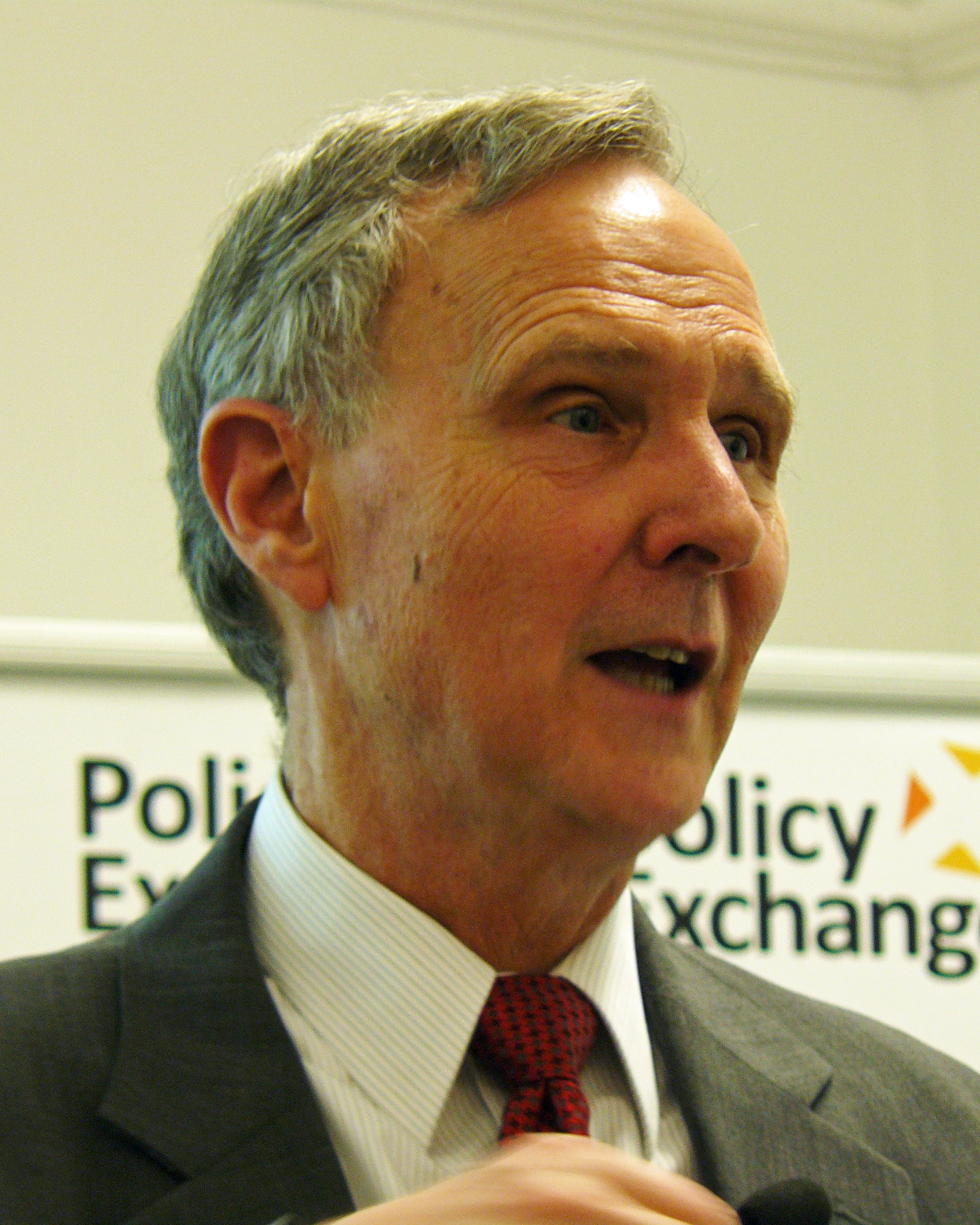
- Hanushek in 2012
- Born: Eric Alan Hanushek; May 22, 1943 (age 83); Lakewood, Ohio, U.S.

Academic background
- Education: Massachusetts Institute of Technology; United States Air Force Academy

Academic work
- Discipline: Education economics
- Institutions: Stanford University; University of Rochester; Yale University
- Awards: Yidan Prize for Education Research, 2021
- Website: Information at IDEAS / RePEc

Eric Alan Hanushek (/ˈhænəʃɛk/; born May 22, 1943) is a US economist who has written prolifically on public policy with a special emphasis on the economics of education. Since 2000, he has been a Paul and Jean Hanna Senior Fellow at the Hoover Institution, a public policy think tank located at Stanford University in California. He was awarded the Yidan Prize for Education Research in 2021.

Hanushek advocates using economic analysis to improve student performance. He has authored numerous, highly cited articles on the effects of class size reduction, high-stakes accountability, Parental Education, teacher effectiveness, and other education related topics. In a 1971 paper he introduced the concept of evaluating teacher effectiveness on the basis of student learning gains. This idea is the basis of value-added assessments of teacher quality. In his most recent book, The Knowledge Capital of Nations, Hanushek concludes that the quality of education is causally related to economic growth.

Hanushek is a periodic contributor to the opinion pages of The Wall Street Journal and also appears in court cases as a paid expert witness testifying for the state in lawsuits brought by plaintiffs attempting to equalize disparities in funding of school districts.

== Activities, appointments, and awards ==
Hanushek received a Bachelor of Science degree from the United States Air Force Academy in 1965 and a PhD in economics from Massachusetts Institute of Technology in 1968. He served in the U.S. Air Force from 1961 to 1974. Hanushek held teaching positions at the U.S. Air Force Academy (1968–73) and at Yale University (1975–78) and was named professor of economics and public policy at the University of Rochester from 1978 to 2000.

Hanushek is a member of the Hoover Institution's Koret Task Force on K-12 Education, whose members, including Caroline M. Hoxby and Paul E. Peterson, support school accountability, teacher incentives, and charter schools and vouchers. Hanushek was a presidential appointee to the Board of Directors of the National Board for Education Sciences that approves the research priorities of the U.S. Department of Education's Institute of Education Sciences and was the board chair from 2008 to 2010. From 2011 to 2013, he served on the Equity and Excellence Commission of the U.S. Department of Education. He is a research professor at the Ifo Institute for Economic Research (LMU Munich) and is the area coordinator for Economics of Education, CESifo Research Network. He is also a research associate of the National Bureau of Economic Research and a research fellow of the Institute for the Study of Labor (IZA). In the U.S. federal government, Hanushek has served as deputy director of the Congressional Budget Office, senior staff economist at the Council of Economic Advisers, and senior economist for the Cost of Living Council. At the state level, he has been appointed to state education advisory commissions by the governor of California and of Texas.

Hanushek was the recipient of an award for scholarship from the Thomas B. Fordham Institute (a think tank) in 2004.

== Personal life ==
Hanushek is married to Margaret (Macke) Raymond, director of the Center for Research on Education Outcomes (CREDO) at Stanford University. CREDO has issued numerous studies of the performance of charter schools in the United States.

== As expert witness ==
Since the early 1970s, when plaintiffs have filed lawsuits seeking to overthrow school funding based on local property taxes as inequitable, Hanushek has been called to testify as an expert witness in defense of the state. He testifies that the problem with schools is not so much lack of funds as inefficiency and asserts that increasing (or seeking to equalize) appropriations can be wasteful, since his analyses show that more funding produces inconsistent outcomes. Instead of seeking to equalize funding among districts, Hanushek recommends introducing value-added testing to identify and remove underperforming teachers, greater accountability, and vouchers and charter schools to introduce market-based parental choice. He labels those who oppose these measures as wanting to protect special interests and sacred cows and accuses them of wanting to maintain the status quo. In particular, Hanushek identifies teachers' unions among the entrenched or special interests that oppose the measures he recommends. The 20 school funding trials at which Hanushek has testified over the years include Serrano v. Priest (1973) in California, Somerset County Board of Education v Hornbeck in Maryland (1980), and Abbott v. Burke (1987) in New Jersey. His amicus brief was cited in the 2009 five-to-four U.S. Supreme Court decision of Horne v. Flores. Citing Hanushek and Lindseth in a majority opinion written by Justice Samuel Alito, the court held that in evaluating the actions of the state, attention should focus on student outcomes rather than on inequalities of spending and other inputs to schools.

In 2011 Hanushek was the central expert witness for the defense in the highly publicized case of Lobato vs. State of Colorado, named for Taylor Lobato, who in 2005 was a middle-school student when her parents filed a suit that claimed her San Luis Valley school district was underfunded compared to wealthier districts. In that case, Denver District Judge Sheila Rappaport issued a 189-page decision rejecting the state's arguments, writing that: "Dr. Hanushek's analysis that there is not much relationship in Colorado between spending and achievement contradicts testimony and documentary evidence from dozens of well-respected educators in the State, defies logic, and is statistically flawed." In 2013, the Colorado Supreme Court reversed Judge Rappaport's opinion and overturned the lower court's opinion in its entirety.

For his part, Hanushek maintains that state and federal court decisions "of the type we describe" (namely, rejecting funding equity appeals) may be justified because they "may persuade the legislature to adopt the more ‘disruptive’ reforms that may actually lead to improvements in student achievement."

== Research ==
Hanushek's Ph.D. thesis introduced a model that he termed an "educational production function" into the analysis of education issues. This model postulated a clear distinction between inputs to education – including family, neighborhood, and peer factors – and outcomes of education – typically measured by student achievement, continuation in school, or ultimately income and employment. According to Hanushek, when placed in the common value-added form, his model identifies the impact of added resources, given prior achievement and other non-school factors.

=== The relationship between resources and class size and academic performance ===
His 1986 paper, "The Economics of Schooling", reported finding an inconsistent relationship between school resources and student outcomes. It provoked numerous responses. For this reason he is associated, especially by his detractors, with the slogan "money doesn't matter". One critic, Larry Hedges, used meta-analysis of Hanushek's own figures to contend that $100 spent per pupil (1989 dollars) would in fact raise student achievement by one-fifth of a standard deviation. Between 1990 and 2010, however, spending per pupil adjusted for inflation rose by $3500, while reading scores of 17-year-olds actually fell. Hanushek responded to critics in "Money might matter somewhere." Hanushek maintains that how money is spent is more important than how much money is spent, now a commonly accepted interpretation of the data. He suggests that money allocated ought to be spent implementing the policies with proven efficacy, such as replacing teachers who fail to raise test scores and closing schools which persistently fail to produce reasonable student achievement. Citing with approval Frederick M. Hess of the American Enterprise Institute, he argues that court decisions over funding adequacy, may create a policy ‘window’ in which "judicial cover is provided for legislative activities and a variety of remedies are put forward. These ‘windows’ have been mainly used to push through higher funding, but there is no reason that court decisions could not also open a ‘window’ during which other reforms, such as those discussed in this book, might also be enacted."

Hanushek's other claim, that class size has no consistent effect on educational performance, is vehemently disputed by Alan Krueger, among others. The debate is summed up in Lawrence Mishel and Richard Rothstein (eds.) The class size debate (Washington, DC: Economic Policy Institute, 2002). See also the peer-reviewed assessment of the evidence in Ronald G. Ehrenberg, Dominic J. Brewer, Adam Gamoran, and J. Douglas Willms, "Class size and student achievement." Psychological Science in the Public Interest 2, no. 1 (May 2001) 1–30

Hanushek explains his position this way:

The discussion whether school resources are systematically related to school quality and to school achievement has tended toward a battle of slogans "Money matters" or "Money doesn't matter." ... It is tautological to say that we will get good performance if we spend the money wisely. Today the existing knowledge base does not ensure that any added funds will, on average, be spent wisely. That is true even if some schools may spend their funds wisely.

As an alternative to increasing funding for public schools as a way to boost student performance, Hanushek recommends holding schools accountable and assessing teacher effectiveness.

=== Effect of teacher and administrator quality on learning gains ===
Hanushek concludes that teacher quality is by far the most important factor in raising student achievement and, moreover, that teacher quality is not closely related to such factors as teacher salaries, educational background, or experience. In considering teacher policies, test scores should be one metric by which the quality of teachers should be measured, Hanushek contends.

In contrast to James Coleman, who in the 1960s had suggested that schools and teachers had little effect on student performance, Hanushek introduced the idea of judging teacher effectiveness based on the learning gains of students. Hanushek's 1992 study of inner-city children showed that disadvantaged pupils taught by good teachers gained one-and one-half years of learning, as opposed to only six months when taught by poor teachers – that is, a difference of a full school year. This finding he maintained had highly significant policy implications.

Hanushek's approach underlies the development of "value-added assessment" methods of teacher effectiveness, which uses statistical analysis of student achievement information (as measured by pupil scores) to evaluate teacher performance. When applied in teacher personnel decisions, value added assessment has been highly controversial. In 2010, the value added rankings for more than 6,000 teachers were published in the Los Angeles Times, resulting in complaints by teachers and their unions that they were being subjected to public shaming. The New York Times also subsequently published such measures for their local teachers. Nonetheless, a significant number of states now require that teacher evaluations include consideration of student achievement and in some cases require the use of value added measures.

In a series of papers, Hanushek argued that replacing the least effective 5–8 percent of teachers with an average teacher could lead to dramatic gains in achievement for U.S. students. By his calculations, average U.S. PISA scores would increase to the level of Canada, or maybe even Finland, and that higher U.S. growth would lead to substantial economic gains. These arguments have led to a continuing and contentious debate. One side has argued that this analysis supports arguments for improving teacher evaluations and for eliminating teacher tenure. The other side has argued that it is not possible to fire yourself to the top.

Hanushek's analyses of teacher value-added and of the impact of teacher effectiveness on economic outcomes of students were central to the California court case of Vergara v. California, a case in which he subsequently testified for the plaintiffs. That court case challenged the constitutionality of the teacher tenure and the teacher dismissal statutes in California. In June 2014 Judge Ralph M. Treu issued his ruling in the case, finding that the statutes in question were unconstitutional. This ruling was subsequently appealed by the California Teachers Association and by Governor Jerry Brown. A follow-on suit was filed in New York State.

Princeton University economist Jesse M. Rothstein has described the use of value-added measurement for evaluating teacher performance, recommended by Hanushek as early as 1971, as conceptually deeply flawed, since value-added scores assume that students are randomly assigned to teachers, whereas in the real world it is almost never the case for students to be randomly assigned to teachers or schools. "Non-random assignment of students to teachers can bias value-added estimates of teachers’ causal effects," Rothstein writes. Daniel F. McCaffrey and Thomas Kane of the Measures of Effective Teaching Project of the Bill and Melinda Gates Foundation had published studies supportive of Hanushek's contentions, as have Raj Chetty (William Henry Bloomberg Professor of Economics at Harvard) et al.

In addition to measuring teachers, Hanushek has also applied his outcome-based approach to measuring the effectiveness of school principals, whom he states also greatly impact student achievement – through their role in selecting and retaining good teachers. This research appeared as working paper "Estimating the effects of leaders on public sector productivity. The case of school principals", published by the National Bureau of Economic Research (2012). The same authors also issued a more general article, "School Leaders Matter", explaining their conclusions in the Hoover Institute magazine Education Next 13: 1 (Winter 2013). In a review, Margaret Terry Orr agreed that principals can have positive effects but she questioned whether value added methods could ever adequately measure their performance, faulting the authors for using "sloppy terminology" and ignoring "a large body of research."

=== Effects of peers and school racial composition ===
Together with co-authors John Kain and Steven Rivkin, Hanushek has studied the influence of peer ability on achievement in elementary classrooms in Texas, concluding that the achievement level of peers exerts a positive influence whose impact is roughly constant across the achievement distribution. In contrast, the variance in achievement appears to have no systematic influence, leading them to conclude that ability grouping per se has no separate impact.

Hanushek et al. also found that achievement levels of black students (but not of white or Hispanic students) appeared to be systematically lowered in the presence of large concentrations of other black students in their school. They found this effect to be especially pronounced among the highest-achieving black students. These results, in their view, underscore the importance of school integration.

=== Economic impact of education ===
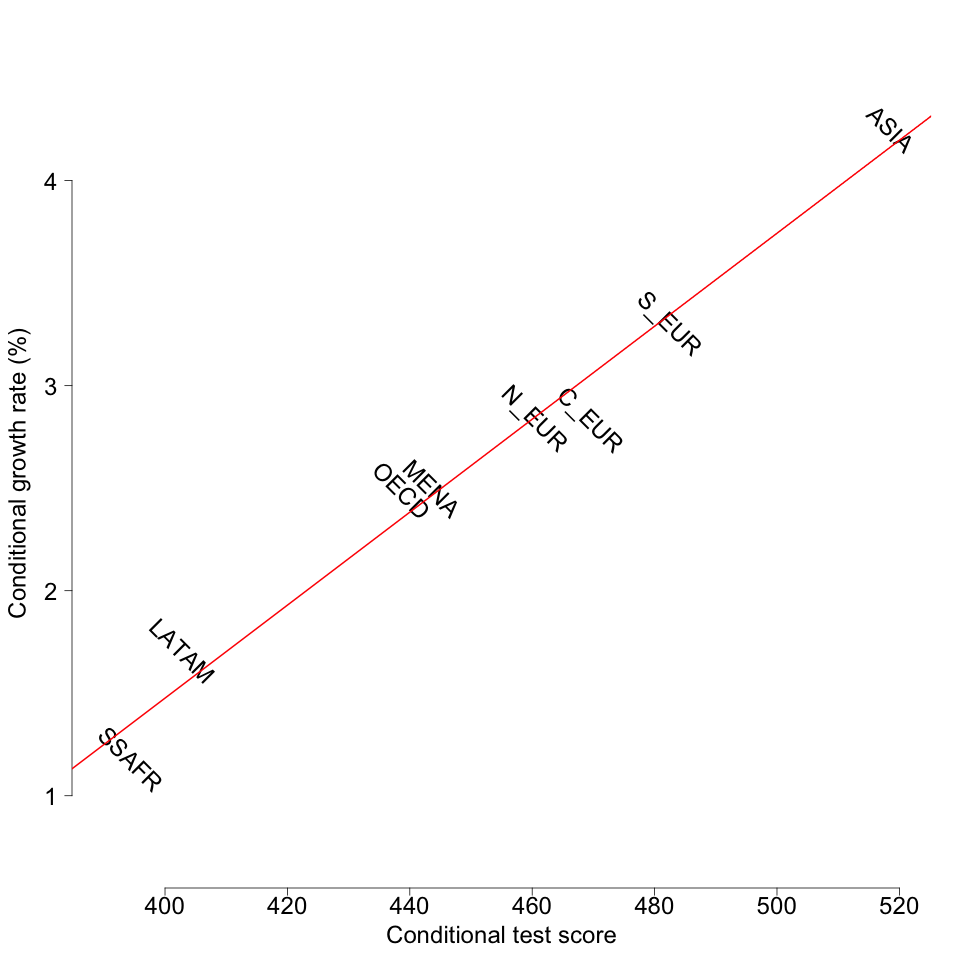
Average annual growth rate in real GDP per capita vs. scores on standardized tests of student achievement 1960-2000 adjusted for 1960 GDP per capita. [From Hanushek and Woessmann (2015, Table 1A.1, similar to their Figure 1.1).]

Hanushek contends that in both individuals and nations, cognitive skills are causally related to economic outcomes such that variations in growth rates across countries can be largely explained by consideration of the role of cognitive skills. Previous studies have measured human capital through years of schooling attained by the labor force, Hanushek, however, believes that cognitive skills as measured by international test scores, give a more accurate picture in industrialized and developing countries alike.

Breton has challenged the validity of Hanushek's claim that cognitive skills, as measured by international test scores, are a more accurate indicator of a nation's capabilities than years of schooling. He argues that the statistical analysis that Hanushek and Woessmann use to support this claim is invalid because their model is mis-specified.

Differences in economic growth among Organisation for Economic Co-operation and Development (OECD) countries closely reflect differences in mathematics and science achievement. Differences in achievement also appear to explain completely the slow growth of Latin America.

At the individual level, differences in cognitive skills across countries receive varying rewards in the labor market. The U.S. appears to reward skills the most, while Poland, Sweden, and the Czech Republic provide the least return among selected countries.

Linking teacher value-added measurement with research on the economic impact of differences in achievement both for individual earnings and for economic growth, Hanushek estimates that the impact of differences in teacher quality is significant, and the least effective teachers in U.S. schools have an especially large impact. He estimates that replacing the least effective 5–8 percent of teachers with an average teacher would increase the Gross Domestic Product (GDP) by 75 to 110 trillion dollars in present value. He discussed the impact of replacing low performing (bottom 5%) teachers with average teachers in the movie Waiting for "Superman".

=== Accountability ===
Hanushek forcefully advocates instituting state and federal accountability systems to improve student achievement, even while acknowledging that existing accountability systems have also been shown to introduce some unwanted outcomes.

In 2011, a United States National Research Council panel issued a report that concluded that empirical results do not support the use of such test-based accountability policies such as the No Child Left Behind Act and high school exit exams. The report concluded that such incentives, which now have been in place for many years, at best have succeeded in raising scores only minutely in the earliest grades and then only in math. The panel also reported that high school exit exams serve only to increase the dropout rate and have no effect on scores. Hanushek responded in the pages of Education Next (published by the Hoover Institution), accusing the panel of "bias" and calling its evidence of poor or non-existent educational improvement "weak". Since then arguments about test-based incentives and school exit exams has intensified. The re-authorization of the No Child Left Behind Act and plans for expansion of high school exit examinations now hinge on the outcome of these debates.

=== Institutional design ===
The operations of schools within are shaped and affected by the structure of each country's schooling, making it difficult to assess the significance of the educational environment. Together with Ludger Woessmann of LMU Munich and other co-authors, Hanushek has developed comparative data-based approaches for identifying the impact of differing educational systems.

=== Ability tracking and local control ===
Hanushek is on record as opposing early ability tracking on the grounds that research shows that early tracking increases educational inequality and can reduce average performance. Countries that separate students into different tracks early tend to increase the variation in student achievement.

Countries also differ in how much local decision making they permit in their schools. Using a method of their own devising, Hanushek, Woessmann, and Susanne Link used international assessment data from the Programme for International Student Assessment, or PISA, to compare changes in student achievement within individual countries to changes in local autonomy over various educational decisions. They concluded that in developed countries, local decision making impacts positively on student performance. This was also more true where countries had external examinations for students. They caution, however, that it might not be valid to generalize such findings from developed countries to developing countries. In less developed countries, particularly where there was no monitoring of schools through external examinations, local decision making was harmful.

Hanushek also looked at the effects of vocational education versus general education. Some analyses suggest that emphasis of specific skills through vocational schooling can result in slower economic growth, since workers with very specific training, might be able to find work more easily when young but may be disadvantaged later when new technologies make their skills obsolete. Hanushek, Guido Schwerdt, Woessmann, and Lei Zhang compared the life-cycle employment and earnings patterns of those with vocational and general education across countries and found that workers in the most vocation-intensive countries ("apprenticeship countries") did suffer later in their careers and tended to leave the labor force noticeably earlier than workers with general training.

=== Education in developing countries ===
Development agencies such as the World Bank and UNESCO have traditionally emphasized expanding access through such initiatives as Education for All and the Millennium Development Goals. Hanushek and Woessmann, however, caution that merely improving access can do little, unless students' cognitive skills are raised, which they say is not happening in many developing countries. They also linked poor quality schools to high dropout rates.

Hanushek's work for the World Bank showed that in developing countries, as in the U.S., policies intended to improve educational resources have not been consistently productive, even though in developing countries they have noticeably lower levels of inputs. In the poorest areas of Brazil, for example, Hanushek and Ralph Harbison contended that large differences among schools and teachers were not systematically related to teacher education, teacher experience, and most other measures of general resources of schools. Hanushek has advocated targeted policies, such as providing text books, which can lead to more efficient schooling by cutting down on grade repetition.

=== The Texas Schools Project ===
As chairman of the executive committee for the Texas Schools Project at the University of Texas at Dallas (UTD), Hanushek worked with John F. Kain to develop the university's Texas Schools Project. This project used administrative data from schools to compile databases to permit the analysis of the effects of teacher labor markets and the impacts of special education, student mobility, school choice, and charter schools. The Texas Schools Project was the model for similar administrative databases such as found in Florida, North Carolina, and New York.

== Publications ==
- Hanushek's 2013 book, Endangering Prosperity: A Global View of the American School, written with Hoover Institute colleague Paul E. Peterson and Ludger Woessmann of LMU Munich, has a foreword by former President of Harvard, Lawrence Summers. It makes the case that poor or average scores on the international Programme for International Student Assessment (PISA) test will cause the US to lose its economic pre-eminence over other nations. Worse, "America's failure to educate is affecting its national security", according to a 2012 task force co-chaired by former New York City school chancellor Joel Klein and former US Secretary of State Condoleezza Rice. Moreover, if the US educational achievement were to match that of Canada, their model suggests that over the next 80 years, the average annual income of every worker in the United States "would be 20 percent higher, all other things being equal. Discounted to the present, the gains from a faster-growing economy over the lifetime of someone born today would amount to five times our current GDP."
- In 2012, he authored an article entitled 'Education Quality and Economic Growth' in The 4% Solution: Unleashing the Economic Growth America Needs, published by the George W. Bush Presidential Center.
- Hanushek's 2009 book with Alfred Lindseth, Schoolhouses, Courthouses, and Statehouses: Solving the Funding-Achievement Puzzle in America's Public Schools (Princeton University Press), makes the case that increasing money for public schools produces inconsistent results and advocates performance-based funding to improve school outcomes.

Other books Hanushek has written or edited include:

- Courting Failure: How School Finance Lawsuits Exploit Judges' Good Intentions And Harm Our Children (Education Next Books) (Hoover Institution Press, 2006);
- Handbook of the Economics of Education (Handbooks in Economics), a four-volume series, which Hanushek edited with Stephen J. Machin, Finis Welch, and Ludger Woessmann (North Holland Press, 2006, 2010, and 2011);
- The Economics of Schooling and School Quality (International Library of Critical Writings in Economics) (Edward Elgar, 2003);
- Improving America's Schools: The Role of Incentives (National National Academies Press, 1996), co-edited with Dale W. Jorgenson;
- Making Schools Work: Improving Performance and Controlling Costs (Brookings Institution Press, 1996);
- Educational Performance of the Poor: Lessons from Rural Northeast Brazil (A World Bank Publication) (Oxford University Press, USA,1992) co-written with H. Ralph Harbison; and
- Education and Education and Race: An Analysis of the Educational Production Process (Lexington Books, 1972).
