= David Welch (optical engineer) =

American optical engineer

David F. Welch
- Born: October 26, 1960 (age 66); Washington, D.C., U.S.
- Education: University of Delaware; Cornell University

David F. Welch (born October 26, 1960) is an American businessman and research scientist. Welch is a pioneer in the field of optical devices and optical transport systems for telecommunications networks. Welch first made it possible to commercially deploy reliable 980 nm laser pumps, needed in low noise optical amplifiers employed in dense wavelength division multiplexing (DWDM) telecommunications systems. He also achieved the first commercial optoelectronics integrated circuit, several years ahead of any competing research or developments laboratory.

Welch was born in Washington, D.C., on October 26, 1960, the youngest of seven children in his family. Welch attended Severna Park High School, a public school in Severna Park, Maryland, and entered the University of Delaware to study electrical engineering at the age of 16. Welch earned a Bachelor of Science in Electrical Engineering from the University of Delaware in 1981 and a Ph.D in Electrical Engineering from Cornell University in 1985.

== Career ==
From January 1985 to February 2001, Welch served in various executive roles, including Chief Technology Officer and Vice President of Corporate Development of SDL, an optical component company. JDS Uniphase acquired SDL in 2001.

From February 2001 to April 2001, Welch served as Chief Technology Officer of the Transmission Division of JDS Uniphase Corporation, an optical component company.

Welch is a co-founder, President and a member of the Board of Directors of Infinera Corp, an optical transport networking company.

== Honors and awards ==
In 2016, Welch was elected to the National Academy of Engineering "For contributions to high-power semiconductor lasers and photonic integrated circuits."

In November 2013, Welch was awarded the Institute of Engineering and Technology (IET) J J Thomson Medal for Electronics. IET Achievement Medals are awarded to individuals who have made major and distinguished contributions in the various sectors of science, engineering and technology. In February 2013, Welch was recognized as #5 of the "Top Ten: Optical Movers and Shakers" by telecommunications publication Light Reading

In 2011, the Optical Society of America (OSA) presented Welch the 2011 John Tyndall Award. The Tyndall Award is the highest recognition in the optical telecommunications community and is co-sponsored by OSA and the IEEE Photonics Society. The Tyndall Award recognizes an individual who has made pioneering, highly significant, or continuing technical or leadership contributions to fiber optics technology.

In 2010, Welch was recognized by the University of Delaware for his outstanding professional and public service achievements by being inducted into the University Alumni Association Wall of Fame.

In 1999, Welch received the Joseph Fraunhofer Award/Robert M. Burley Prize from the Optical Society of America. The award recognizes significant research accomplishments in the field of optical engineering.

In 1998, Welch was the recipient of the IEEE LEOS Engineering Achievement Award, presented to him "for the design, development and commercialization of high power diffraction limited semiconductor lasers."

In 1991, Welch received the Adolph Lomb Medal from the Optical Society of America. The Adolph Lomb Medal, established in 1940, is presented to a person who has made a noteworthy contribution to optics at an early age. The candidate cannot be older than the age of 35 in the calendar year of presentation. The following year, OSA elected him a Fellow.

== Publications and patents ==
Welch has made numerous contributions to the field of optical communication systems—including more than 250 published articles and 125 patents

== Role in California Education ==
In 2011, Welch founded Students Matter, a non-profit organization committed to ensuring access to quality education through impact litigation, communications and advocacy. Students Matter's nationally-watched case, Vergara v. California, challenged California's teacher employment laws around teacher tenure, dismissal and layoffs. Vergara plaintiffs, a group of 9 California public school students, received a favorable decision from the California Superior Court in 2014 in which the judge wrote, "The evidence is compelling. Indeed, it shocks the conscience.". In 2016, a three-judge state appellate court panel reversed the superior court's ruling Students Matter indicated it would appeal that decision to the California Supreme Court, but the Supreme Court let the appellate court's ruling stand.
