= George G. Sadowski =

American politician

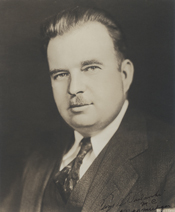
George G. Sadowski

George Gregory Sadowski (March 12, 1903 – October 9, 1961) was an American lawyer and politician who served three terms in the United States House of Representatives from the U.S. state of Michigan from 1933 to 1939.

== Early life and education ==
Sadowski was born in Detroit, Michigan, in a Polish-American family where he attended Ferry School. He attended high school in Foley, Alabama, and then returned to Detroit, where he graduated from Northeastern High School in 1920 and from the law department of the University of Detroit in 1924. He was admitted to the bar in 1926 and commenced practice in Detroit. He was involved in the real estate and building businesses and later became the owner of two golf clubs. He was also a member of the Polish National Alliance.

== Political career ==
Sadowski was a member of the Michigan Senate from the 2nd district in 1931 and 1932, and a member of the State Democratic Central Committee from 1930 to 1936. He was a delegate to the Democratic National Convention in 1932, 1936, 1940, 1944, and 1948.

He was elected as a Democrat from Michigan's first congressional district to the 73rd, 74th, and 75th Congresses, serving from March 4, 1933, to January 3, 1939. He lost to Rudolph G. Tenerowicz in the Democratic primary in 1938 and again in 1940. In 1942, he was elected to the 78th and then to the three succeeding Congresses, serving from January 3, 1943, to January 3, 1951. In 1950, he lost to Thaddeus M. Machrowicz in the Democratic primary.

== Death ==
George G. Sadowski died in Utica, Michigan, and is interred in Mount Olivet Cemetery in Detroit, Michigan.

U.S. House of Representatives
Preceded by Robert H. Clancy	United States Representative for the 1st congressional district of Michigan; 1933–1939	Succeeded by Rudolph G. Tenerowicz
Preceded by Rudolph G. Tenerowicz	United States Representative for the 1st congressional district of Michigan; 1943–1951	Succeeded by Thaddeus M. Machrowicz
