= R2T =

R2T may refer to:

- Race to the Top, an education initiative announced in 2009 by Secretary Arne Duncan
- Remember Two Things, the 1993 album by the Dave Matthews Band
