= The Color of Law =

2017 book by Richard Rothstein

- Cover image
- Author: Richard Rothstein
- Subject: Jim Crow, redlining
- Publisher: Liveright
- Publication date: May 2, 2017
- Pages: 368 pp.
- Awards: 2018 Hillman Prize for Book Journalism
- ISBN: 978-1-63149-285-3
- OCLC: 959808903
- Dewey Decimal: 305.8
- LC Class: E185.61

The Color of Law: A Forgotten History of How Our Government Segregated America is a 2017 book by Richard Rothstein on the history of racial segregation in the United States. The book documents the history of state sponsored segregation stretching back to the late 1800s and exposes racially discriminatory policies put forward by most presidential administrations in that time, including liberal presidents like Franklin Roosevelt. The author argues that intractable segregation in America is primarily the result of explicit government policies at the local, state, and federal levels, also known as de jure segregation — rather than the actions of individuals or private companies, or de facto segregation. Among other discussions, the book provides a history of subsidized housing and discusses the phenomena of white flight, blockbusting, and racial covenants, and their role in housing segregation. Rothstein wrote the book while serving as a research associate for the Economic Policy Institute, where he is now a Distinguished Fellow.

The book has been reviewed many times and was received with critical acclaim; among other honors, it made the longlist for the 2017 National Book Awards, was placed at number four on Publishers Weekly's Top 10 Best Books of 2017, and won Rothstein the 2018 Hillman Prize for Book Journalism. It went on to become a bestseller during the mid-2020 resurgence of national interest in racial injustice following the George Floyd protests. As of the December 20th, 2020 issue, the book has spent 32 total weeks on The New York Times Best Seller list.

== Background ==
At the time of the book's release, Rothstein was a research associate at the Economic Policy Institute and a fellow Haas Institute at the University of California, Berkeley. He is currently a Distinguished Fellow at the Policy Institute, a senior fellow emeritus at the Thurgood Marshall Institute of the NAACP Legal Defense Fund, and is considered a leading authority on housing policy in the United States. He has previously written several other articles on race and educational accountability and is the author of several other books in the area, including Class and Schools: Using Social, Economic and Educational Improvement to Close the Black-White Achievement Gap and Grading Education: Getting Accountability Right.

== Content ==
Table of contents
Chapter	Title
1	If San Francisco, then Everywhere?
2	Public Housing, Black Ghettos
3	Racial Zoning
4	"Own Your Own Home"
5	Private Agreements, Government Enforcement
6	White Flight
7	IRS Support and Compliant Regulators
8	Local Tactics
9	State-Sanctioned Violence
10	Suppressed Incomes
11	Looking Forward, Looking Back
12	Considering Fixes

The book is composed of twelve chapters and includes an epilogue as well as an appendix of frequently asked questions. The first chapter of the book, "If San Francisco, then Everywhere?", argues that the racially disparate policies instituted by the otherwise liberal governments of cities such as San Francisco is evidence of a widespread problem. Chapter two discusses the history of subsidized housing in the United States. The third chapter covers policies of "racial zoning", where local zoning ordinances lead to the segregation of white and black neighborhoods. Chapter four discusses a program by the US government, the Own-Your-Own-Home campaign, that systematically made it easier for white people to buy and pay off new homes in suburbs in the early 1900s. The fifth chapter discusses police and court enforcement of private agreements forbidding the sale of homes in white neighborhoods to blacks and other minorities. Many of these agreements were in the form of covenants in a house's deed which explicitly blocked sales of the homes to anyone not of the "Caucasian race". Chapter six discusses white flight and blockbusting tactics used by real estate agents to accelerate the migration in order to make a profit.

== Themes ==
Segregation is categorized into two types by Rothstein, de jure and de facto. While de facto segregation simply exists due to people's habits, de jure segregation is the result of laws and ordinances that discriminate against minorities. In the preface of the book, Rothstein argues that, if it can be shown that housing segregation in America is the result of de jure factors rather than simply de facto, then all Americans have a constitutional obligation to remedy the problem. The book is devoted to arguing that intractable segregation in America is de jure in nature, being the result of explicit government policies at the local, state, and federal levels. Focusing on post-Reconstruction racial segregation in the United States, the book provides a history of subsidized housing, the phenomena of white flight and blockbusting, and the concept of racial covenants, which all factor into the history of housing segregation in America. In the book's discussions of the history of subsidized housing, it exposes policies in FDR's New Deal that oversaw construction of public housing, built with federal tax dollars, in which African Americans were systematically excluded. Among discussions of other government programs to the same end, the book finds that African Americans were excluded from most FHA insured loans, due to the high risk of providing mortgages on homes in racially mixed neighborhoods, and shows a pattern of US courts upholding private exclusionary agreements, known as covenants, which forbade the sale of homes to minority groups.

== Publication history ==
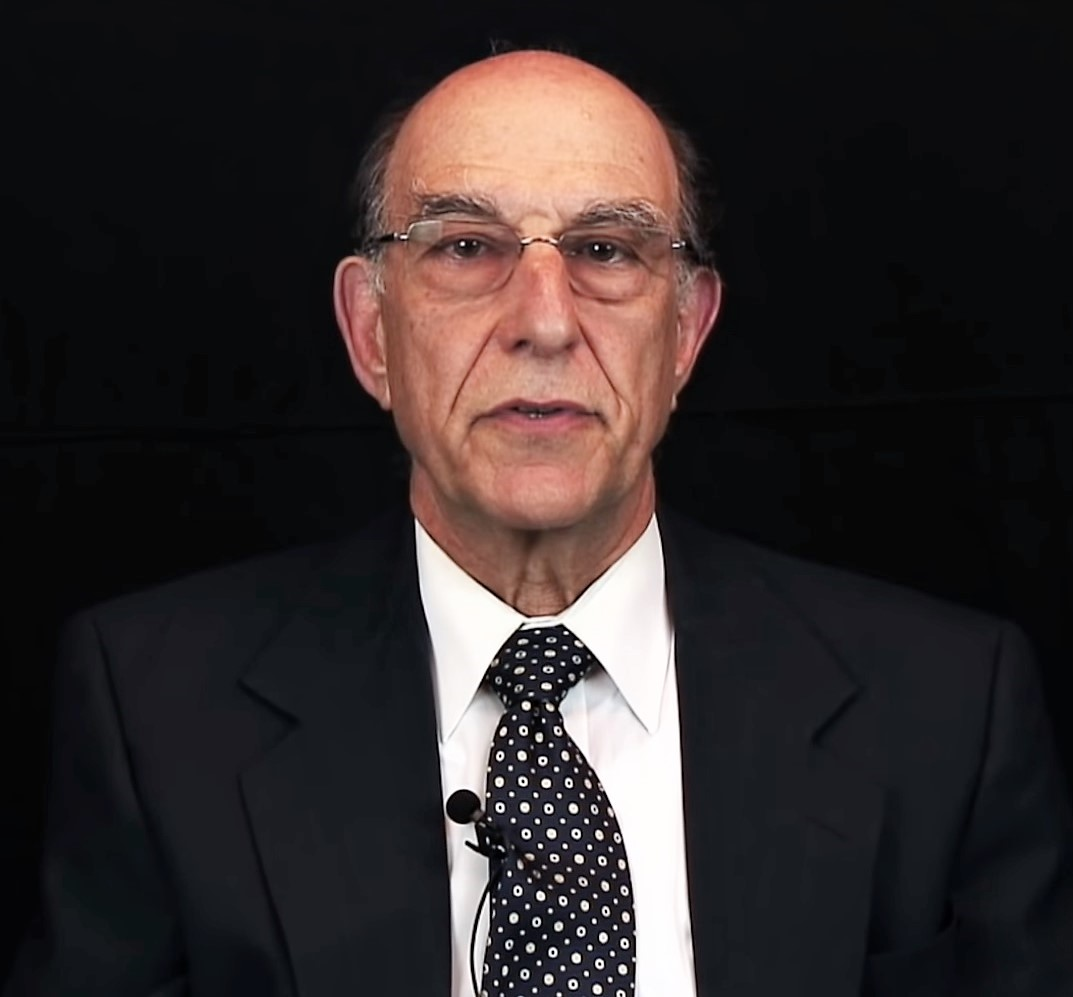
The author, pictured in 2015

The book was published in New York in May 2017 by Liveright Publishing, an imprint of W. W. Norton & Company. It was originally published in hardback with ISBN 978-1-63149-285-3 and in e-book format with ISBN 978-1-63149-286-0, while a paperback edition with ISBN 978-1-63149-453-6 was published a year later. In addition to the publications by Liveright, Recorded Books released an audiobook edition in October 2017.

- Rothstein, Richard (May 2, 2017). The color of law : a forgotten history of how our government segregated America (1st ed.). New York. ISBN 978-1-63149-285-3. OCLC 959808903. (hardcover)
- Rothstein, Richard (May 2, 2017). The color of law : a forgotten history of how our government segregated America (1st ed.). New York. ISBN 978-1-63149-286-0. OCLC 985448400. (eBook)
- Rothstein, Richard. (October 11, 2017), The color of law : a forgotten history of how our government segregated America, Grupper, Adam (Narrator) (1st ed.), Prince Frederick, MD: Recorded Books, ISBN 978-1-5019-7676-6, OCLC 1001028754 (CD)
- Rothstein, Richard (October 11, 2017), The color of law : a forgotten history of how our government segregated America, Grupper, Adam (Narrator) (1st ed.), Prince Frederick, MD: Recorded Books, ISBN 978-1-5019-7773-2, OCLC 1000822541 (MP3)
- Rothstein, Richard (October 11, 2017), The color of law : a forgotten history of how our government segregated America, Grupper, Adam (Narrator) (1st ed.), Prince Frederick, MD: Recorded Books, ISBN 978-1-5019-7687-2, OCLC 1129383092 (eAudio)
- Rothstein, Richard (May 1, 2018). The color of law : a forgotten history of how our government segregated America (1st ed.). New York. ISBN 978-1-63149-453-6. OCLC 959808903. (paperback)

== Reception ==
The book has received many reviews in newspapers, magazines, periodicals, and scientific journals and has been listed on The New York Times Non-Fiction Paperback Best Seller list for non-fiction paperback books over two dozen times. Among others, the book was reviewed by Francesca Russello Ammon, David Oshinsky, Anna Richardson, Terry Gross, and Jacqueline Jones. Reviews have been published in several newspapers, including The New York Times, The Washington Post, NPR, The Tampa Bay Times, and The Baltimore Sun, as well as several popular magazines and periodicals, such as Publishers Weekly, Slate Magazine, The New York Review of Books, The Los Angeles Review of Books, The Kenyon Review, Kirkus Reviews, Dissent Magazine, and Jacobin. It has also received many reviews in history journals, education journals, and administrative and planning journals.

=== Reviews ===
In The New York Times Book Review for the work, written by David Oshinsky in June 2017, the book is called "a powerful and disturbing history of residential segregation in America". Oshinsky went on to write that "[o]ne of the great strengths of Rothstein's account is the sheer weight of evidence he marshals." After some analysis of the book and a discussion of background information, Oshinsky closes the review by writing that "[w]hile the road forward is far from clear, there is no better history of this troubled journey than The Color of Law."

In her November 2017 review, Anna Richardson wrote that the book is "broadly accessible yet painstakingly researched" and notes that "[i]t is the rare book that evokes as much anger and outrage as this one". After a discussion of the book's insights, Richardson closes the review by stating that the book documents in "appalling detail" the need for affirmative action as the "remedy for state-sponsored discrimination of the past". Jacqueline Jones called the book "compelling" in her Fall 2017 review of the book and wrote that it provides "a detailed examination of the ways public entities have colluded with private interests to keep black people out of white neighborhoods".

In the June 2019 issue of Jacobin magazine, Richard Walker, a professor emeritus of geography at the University of California — Berkeley, criticized the book for giving outsized blame to federal policy for housing segregation, a conclusion that he said was the result of Rothstein's "dubious scholarship." Wrote Walker, "The fundamental error of this thesis stems from its depiction of racism as a system imposed from above, by the state, rather than something embedded in American social structures since before the founding." Walker states that, while federal housing law "lined up with the prevailing practices of racial segregation … Rothstein's idea that this was imposed on reluctant localities is ludicrous." Rothstein responded to Walker's critique in the same magazine, criticizing both the content and motivations of Walker's article.

=== Accolades ===
Among other acclamations of the book, it made the longlist for the 2017 National Book Awards, it was placed at number four on Publishers Weekly's Top 10 Best Books of 2017, it was named one of NPR's Best Books of 2017 one of Bill Gates' favorite books of the same year, and it won Rothstein the 2018 Hillman Prize for Book Journalism. The book spent four weeks on The New York Times Best Seller list beginning at position three in the May 20, 2018, issue and ending at number ten on June 10, 2018, issue. Following protests in the United States, the book re-entered the list in June 2020. For the book's 23rd consecutive week and 28th total week on the list in the November 22, 2020, issue, the book was placed at number five. As of the December 20th, 2020 issue, the book has spent 32 total weeks on the list.

The book's award summary for the 2018 Hillman Prize for Book Journalism argues the work had provided "incontrovertible evidence that it was the laws and policies passed by local, state, and federal governments that actually promoted the discriminatory patterns that continue to this day". After summarizing the topics, the Hillman Foundation went on to note that "Rothstein's invaluable examination shows that relearning this history is a necessary step because it is the foundation for understanding that aggressive policies are in order to desegregate these urban areas and finally pave the way for the nation to remedy its unconstitutional past".

== See also ==
- Racism in the United States
- Racial inequality in the United States
- Racial segregation in the United States
- Race in the United States criminal justice system
- Race and crime in the United States
- Mass racial violence in the United States
- America's Original Sin (2015)
- The First Civil Right (2014)
- The Racial Contract (1997)
