= Head teacher =

Most senior teacher at a school

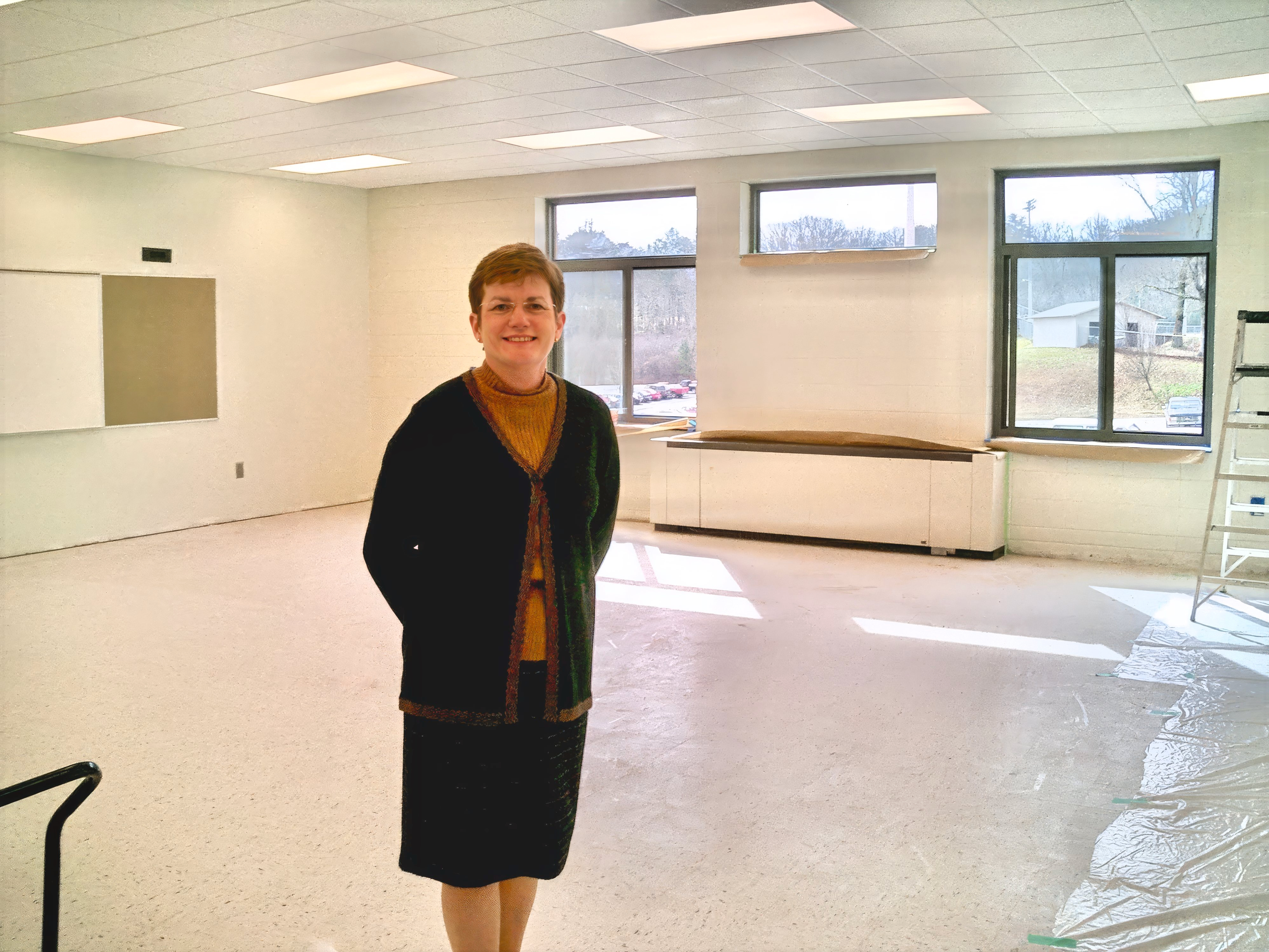
A public high school principal in a newly-built classroom at Hayesville High School in North Carolina, U.S.

A headmaster (feminine: headmistress), head teacher, head, school administrator, principal or school director (sometimes another title is used) is responsible for the management of a school.

== Role ==
While some head teachers still do some teaching, in most larger schools, most of their duties are managerial and pastoral. Their duties often include disciplining misbehaving students and helping to organize school-sponsored activities, and teachers report to them.

In Australia, the head teacher is sometimes in charge of one (in the case of a major subject) or multiple (often in smaller schools) specific departments, such as English, history, maths, science, writing, technology, etc., but maintains full teaching duties and status. They are considered part of the school executive, and often a head teacher position is a stepping-stone into administration.

Rapid demographic changes in the United States have resulted in an increasingly culturally and linguistically diverse Pre K-12 student population, so classroom teachers and principals in the U.S. are not only focusing on instructional issues, but also need to increase educational leadership, cross-cultural leadership, and multicultural education.

== Assistants ==
In larger schools, the principal is assisted by one or more "vice-principals", "assistant principals", "associate principals", or "deputy principals". Their position is secondary to the principal with regard to school governance. Assistant principals generally perform specific duties such as handling student discipline, curriculum, student council or student activities whereas the principal has the ultimate responsibility for the school as a whole (including faculty and staff, physical plant, etc.).

== Regional information ==
=== Australia and New Zealand ===
In many Australian and New Zealand schools, a principal is the head administrator of a school who has been appointed to her/his position by the school board, superintendent, or other body. The principal, often in conjunction with the school board, makes the executive decisions that govern the school, as well as having the authority over the employment (and in some cases firing) of teachers. The principal is often the chief disciplinarian of the students.

== Impact of school principals ==
While there has been considerable anecdotal discussion about the importance of school principals, there has been very little systematic research into their impact on student outcomes. Recent analysis in the United States has examined how the gains in student achievement at a school change after the principal changes. This outcome-based approach to measuring effectiveness of principals is very similar to the value-added modeling that has been applied to the evaluation of teachers. Such research in the state of Texas found that principals have a very large impact on student achievement. Effective school principals have been shown to significantly improve the performance of all students at the school, at least in part through their impacts on selection and retention of good teachers. Ineffective principals have a similarly large negative effect on school performance, suggesting that issues of evaluation are as important for school administrators as they are for teachers. The impact of principals has also been measured in non-traditional ways. Some principals have focused their efforts on creating more inclusive schools for students with disabilities.

== See also ==
- Dean (education)
- School governor
- Schoolmaster
- Superintendent (education)
- Vice-principal
