= The First Civil Right =

2014 book by Naomi Murakawa

The First Civil Right: How Liberals Built Prison America
- Author: Naomi Murakawa
- Published: 11 August 2014
- Publisher: Oxford University Press
- Publication place: United States
- Pages: 280
- ISBN: 9780199892808

The First Civil Right: How Liberals Built Prison America is a 2014 non-fiction book by political scientist Naomi Murakawa, a professor of African American studies at Princeton University. It addresses causes of the rapid increase in U.S. incarceration rates since the 1970s and of racial inequality in the U.S. prison system. Specifically, it traces the roles of liberal politicians, particularly national-level Democrats, in shaping racially unequal incarceration policies. For the book, Murakawa received the Michael Harrington Book Award by the New Political Science section of the APSA in 2015.

Murakawa's approach specifically "discounts intentions, recognizing that racial power is not necessarily exerted by will." Instead the book investigates differing forms of racism and how they have functionally influenced the U.S. prison system.

According to Murakawa, Democratic efforts to professionalize the U.S. justice system in response to racial bias in policing effectively contributed to that racially discriminatory policing and imprisonment practices. Examples discussed include the Boggs Act of 1952 and the Narcotic Control Act of 1956 which both created mandatory sentencing, a policy that would entail racial inequality during the war on drugs. More recently, Bill Clinton's 1994 Omnibus Crime Bill, which was heavily supported by Joe Biden, expanded the federal death penalty and minimum sentencing, which has been disproportionately applied to racial minorities. Minimum sentencing and drug laws have also significantly increased incarceration rates for nonviolent offenders.

Murakawa notes that the term "the first civil right" was first used in the Truman administration to refer to the right to be protected from violence, specifically black protection from white supremacist violence, but the term was later popularized by Nixon to implicitly mean protection of white people from black people.
