= Koret Task Force =

Group at the Hoover Institution

The Koret Task Force on K–12 Education is a group of senior education scholars brought together by the Hoover Institution, Stanford University, who work collectively as well as individually on American public education reform issues. The task force was created in 1999 as part of the Hoover Institution's Initiative on American Educational Institutions and Academic Performance. The group conducts original research and assessments of a broad variety of K–12 education issues, policies, and practices.

The task force supports three core education reform principles: accountability, choice, and transparency. In its scholarship and writing, the group has advanced reforms that ensure rigorous academic standards and assessments, competition among schools, parental choice, results-based performance incentives, and public access to information about every school and school system. The task force has written on such issues as accountability and academic achievement, charter schools, curriculum and learning standards, education finance issues, the No Child Left Behind (NCLB) Act, the politics of public education, and teacher certification, professional development, and incentive pay structures. The group has advised, among others, congressional leaders and staff, governors and state legislators, state education officers, and officials at the U.S. Department of Education. The members of the task force have provided testimony before legislatures, courts, and governmental and policy organizations. Their articles and commentaries appear frequently in the pages of major publications, as well as on broadcast and electronic media. In addition to its research and analysis, the Koret Task Force serves as the editorial board of the Hoover-affiliated journal Education Next.

== Members ==
Current members of the Koret Task Force are

- John E. Chubb, a founding partner, executive vice president, and chief education officer of Edison Schools and a distinguished visiting fellow at the Hoover Institution.
- Williamson M. Evers, a research fellow at the Hoover Institution (on leave). Evers has been nominated by President George W. Bush to be assistant secretary of education for planning, evaluation, and policy development at the U.S. Department of Education.
- Chester E. Finn Jr., chairman of the Koret Task Force and a senior fellow at the Hoover Institution and president and trustee of the Thomas B. Fordham Foundation.
- Eric A. Hanushek, the Paul and Jean Hanna Senior Fellow at the Hoover Institution, chairman of the Executive Committee for the Texas Schools Project at the University of Texas at Dallas, and a research associate of the National Bureau of Economic Research.
- Paul T. Hill, the John and Marie Corbally Professor at the University of Washington's Daniel J. Evans School of Public Affairs, director of the Center on Reinventing Public Education, and a distinguished visiting fellow at the Hoover Institution.
- Caroline M. Hoxby, a senior fellow at the Hoover Institution, professor of economics at Stanford University, and the director of the Economics of Education Program for the National Bureau of Economic Research.
- Terry M. Moe, a senior fellow at the Hoover Institution and the William Bennett Munro Professor of Political Science at Stanford University.
- Paul E. Peterson, senior fellow at the Hoover Institution and the Henry Lee Shattuck Professor of Government and the director of the Program on Education Policy and Governance at Harvard University.
- Herbert J. Walberg, a University Scholar at the University of Illinois at Chicago and a distinguished visiting fellow at the Hoover Institution.

=== Members Emeritus ===
E. D. Hirsch Jr. is a member emeritus of the Koret Task Force on K–12 Education. He was a distinguished visiting fellow at the Hoover Institution from 1999 to 2006. Hirsch is the founder and chairman of Core Knowledge Foundation and a professor emeritus of education and humanities at the University of Virginia.

== Publications ==
The publications of the Koret Task Force include

- Education Next: A Journal of Opinion and Research (quarterly)
- Charter Schools against the Odds (Education Next Books, 2006)
- Courting Failure: How School Finance Lawsuits Exploit Judges' Good Intentions and Harm Our Children (Education Next Books, 2006)
- Reforming Education in Florida (Hoover Institution Press, 2006)
- Reforming Education in Arkansas (Hoover Institution Press, 2005)
- Within Our Reach: How America Can Educate Every Child (Rowman & Littlefield Publishers, in association with the Hoover Institution, 2005)
- Reforming Education in Texas (Hoover Institution Press, 2004)
- Our Schools and Our Future ...Are We Still at Risk? (Hoover Institution Press, 2003)
- Choice with Equity (Hoover Institution Press, 2002)
- School Accountability (Hoover Institution Press, 2002)
- A Primer on America's Schools (Hoover Institution Press, 2001)
