= Naomi Murakawa =

American political scientist

- Title: Associate professor

Academic background
- Education: Columbia University (BA); London School of Economics (MSc); Yale University (PhD)
- Thesis: Electing to Punish: Congress, Race, and the American Criminal Justice State (2005)

Academic work
- Discipline: Political science
- Sub-discipline: African-American studies
- Institutions: Princeton University
- Notable works: The First Civil Right

Naomi Murakawa is an American political scientist and associate professor of African-American studies at Princeton University. Along with Kent Eaton, she is also the co-chair of the 2017 American Political Science Association (APSA) Section 24 meeting. Murakawa received her B.A. in women’s studies from Columbia University, her M.Sc. in social policy from the London School of Economics, and her Ph.D. in political science from Yale University. She is known for her 2014 book, The First Civil Right, which contends that American liberals are just as responsible for mass incarceration in the United States as conservatives are. In 2015, Murakawa won the Michael Harrington Book Award from APSA for this book.

== Selected publications ==
- Murakawa, Naomi (2016). The First Civil Right: How Liberals Built Prison America. New York: Oxford University Press. ISBN 978-0199892785.
- Beckett, Katherine; N. Murakawa (2012). "Mapping the shadow carceral state: Toward an institutionally capacious approach to punishment". Theoretical Criminology. 16 (2): 221–44. doi:10.1177/1362480612442113.
- Murakawa, Naomi; K. Beckett (2010). "The Penology of Racial Innocence: The Erasure of Racism in the Study and Practice of Punishment". Law & Society Review. 44 (3–4): 695–730. doi:10.1111/j.1540-5893.2010.00420.x. PMID 21132957.

== See also ==
- Keeanga-Yamahtta Taylor
