= Race to the Top =

U.S. Department of Education competitive grant

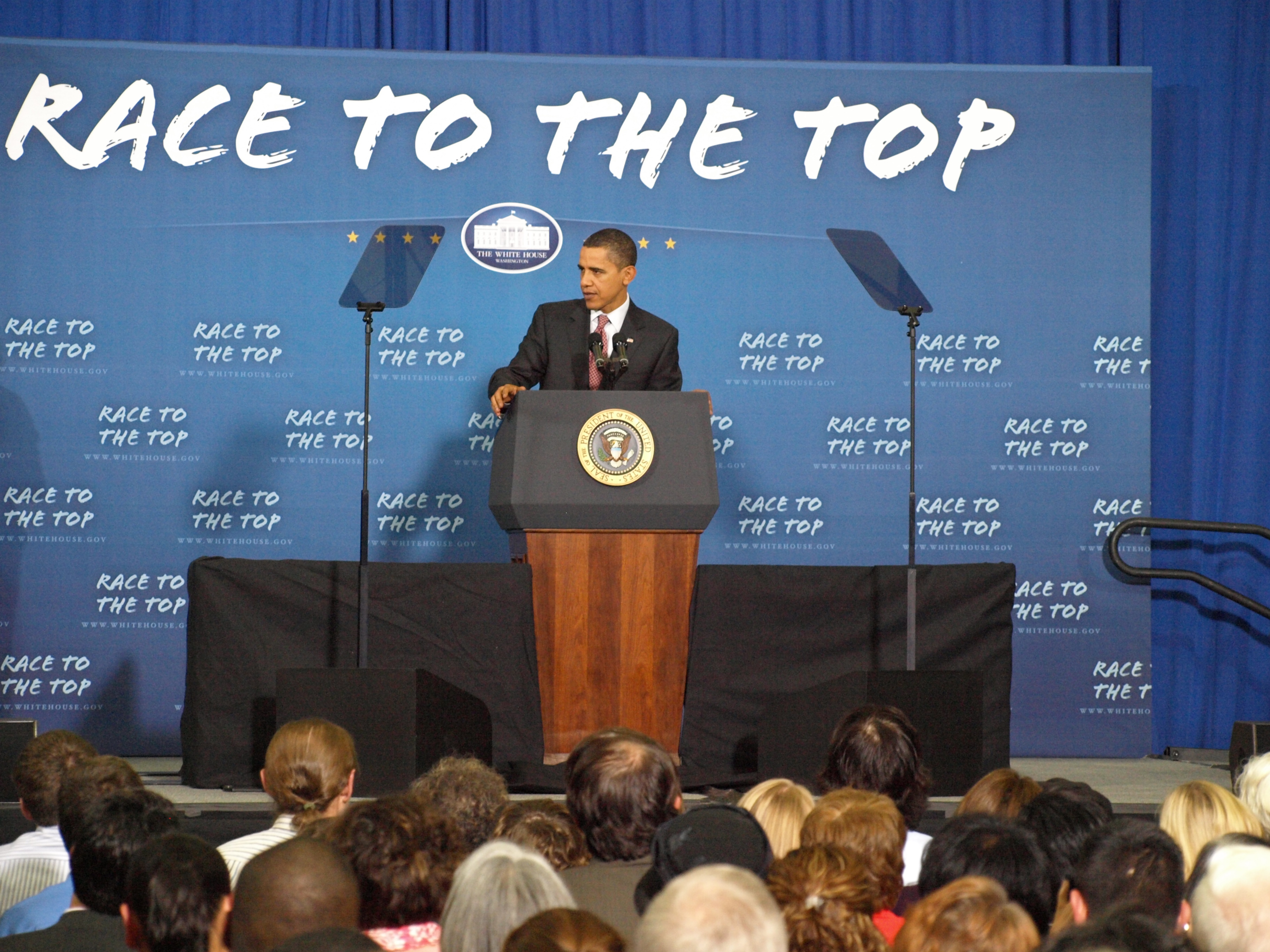
President Barack Obama promoting the competitive grant program at a November 2009 event in Madison, Wisconsin

Race to the Top (R2T, RTTT or RTT) was a $4.35 billion United States Department of Education competitive grant created to spur and reward innovation and reforms in state and local district K–12 education. Funded as part of the American Recovery and Reinvestment Act of 2009, it was announced by President Barack Obama and Secretary of Education Arne Duncan on July 24, 2009. States competing for the grants were awarded points for enacting certain educational policies, instituting performance-based evaluations for teachers and principals based on multiple measures of educator effectiveness (tied to targeted professional development and feedback), adopting common standards (though adoption of the Common Core state standards was not required), adopting policies that did not prohibit (or effectively prohibit) the expansion of high-quality charter schools, turning around the lowest-performing schools, and building and using data systems.

== Criteria for funding ==
State applications for funding were scored on selection criteria worth a total of 500 points. In order of weight, the selection criteria were:

- Great teachers and leaders (138 total points)
  - Improving teacher and principal effectiveness based on performance (58 points)
  - Ensuring equitable distribution of effective teachers and principals (25 points)
  - Providing high-quality pathways for aspiring teachers and principals (21 points)
  - Providing effective support to teachers and principals (20 points)
  - Improving the effectiveness of teacher and principal preparation programs (14 points)
- State success factors (125 total points)
  - Articulating state's education reform agenda and LEAs' participation in it (65 points)
  - Building strong statewide capacity to implement, scale up, and sustain proposed plans (30 points)
  - Demonstrating significant progress in raising achievement and closing gaps (30 points)
- Standards and assessments (70 total points)
  - Developing and adopting common standards (40 points)
  - Supporting the transition to enhanced standards and high-quality assessments (20 points)
  - Developing and implementing common, high-quality assessments (10 points)
- General selection criteria (55 total points)
  - Ensuring successful conditions for high-performing charters and other innovative schools (40 points)
  - Making education funding a priority (10 points)
  - Demonstrating other significant reform conditions (5 points)
- Turning around the lowest-achieving schools (50 total points)
  - Turning around the lowest-achieving schools (40 points)
  - Intervening in the lowest-achieving schools and LEAs (10 points)
- Data systems to support instruction (47 total points)
  - Fully implementing a statewide longitudinal data system (24 points)
  - Using data to improve instruction (18 points)
  - Accessing and using State data (5 points)

In addition to the 485 possible points from the selection criteria above, applicants were assessed based on six priorities, including the prioritization of STEM (science, technology, engineering, and math) education which is worth another fifteen points for a possible total of 500.

- Priority 1, absolute priority: comprehensive approach to education reform
- Priority 2, competitive preference priority: emphasis on science, technology, engineering, and mathematics (STEM) (This priority was worth 15 points, bringing the "selection criteria" total to 500 points)
- Priority 3, invitational priority: innovations for improving early learning outcomes
- Priority 4, invitational priority: expansion and adaptation of statewide longitudinal data systems
- Priority 5, invitational priority: P-20 coordination, vertical and horizontal alignment
- Priority 6, invitational priority: school-level conditions for reform, innovation, and learning

The applications for Race to the Top were bolstered by local involvement: states were incentivized to get buy-in from school district superintendents and teacher unions; applications required signatures from the states' education chiefs, governors, and attorneys general in order to qualify.

== Effects ==
Several states changed their education policies to make their applications more competitive. For instance, Illinois increased the cap on the number of charter schools it allows from 60 to 120; Massachusetts passed legislation to "aggressively intervene in [its] lowest-performing schools", and West Virginia proposed, but did not establish, a performance-based salary system that would have included student achievement in its compensation calculations. In order to be eligible, states couldn't have laws prohibiting the use of measures of student achievement growth in teacher evaluations. Some states had banned the use of value-added modeling in evaluations, but changed their laws to be eligible.

Race to the Top is one contributing factor to 48 states that have adopted common standards for K-12. Adoption was accelerated by the August 1, 2010 deadline for adopting common standards, after which states would not receive points toward round 2 applications. In addition, the White House announced a $350 million federal grant funding the development of assessments aligned to the common standards. The Common Core State Standards, one set of standards adopted by states for Race to the Top, were developed by the National Governors Association and the Council of Chief State School Officers with funds from the Bill and Melinda Gates Foundation, the Charles Stewart Mott Foundation and others. Adoption of the Common Core State Standards, however, was not required by Race to the Top.

== Timetable ==
Phase 1 applications for funding were due on January 19, 2010. 40 states applied for funding, as did the District of Columbia. Phase 1 finalists were announced on March 4, 2010, and phase 1 winners were announced on March 29, 2010. The deadline for submitting Phase 2 applications was June 1; Phase 2 decisions were announced on August 24, 2010. Phase 3 applications were split into two parts. Part I was due November 22, 2011 and Part II was due December 16. Awards were announced on December 23. Winners of Phase 3 included: Arizona, Colorado, Illinois, Kentucky, Louisiana, New Jersey, and Pennsylvania. Only Phase 2 finalists who did not earn money were eligible. Race to the Top - Early Learning Challenge, jointly conducted by the Department of Education and the United States Department of Health and Human Services, applications were due October 20. On April 9, 2012, the Department of Education announced there would be a second round of the Race to the Top - Early Learning Challenge. The five states that were close to winning in the first round (CO, IL, NM, OR, WI) would compete for $133 million. On May 22, 2012, the Department of Education proposed draft criteria for a district-level Race to the Top program. On December 19, 2013, six additional states (Georgia, Kentucky, Michigan, New Jersey, Pennsylvania and Vermont) were awarded a total of $280 million from the 2013 Early Learning Challenge (RTT-ELC) fund.

== Awards ==
States were eligible for different funding award brackets depending on their share of the federal population of children between the ages of 5–17. Phase 1 award bands ranged from $20–75 million up to the highest phase 1 award range of $350–$700 million. Only the four largest states, by population, (California, Texas, Florida, and New York) were eligible for this highest bracket. Over three rounds, 18 states plus the District of Columbia were awarded grants totaling $4.1 billion (not including RTTT-Early Learning Challenge grants). These awardees in aggregate serve approximately 22 million students making up approximately 45% of the all K-12 students in the United States.

Race to the Top results
State	Round 1 score (place)	Round 1 result	Round 2 score (place)	Round 2 result	Round 3 score	Round 3 result
Alabama	291.2 (37th)	–	212.0 (36th)	–	–	–
Arizona	240.2 (40th)	–	435.4 (12th)	Finalist	–	Awarded $25 million
Arkansas	394.4 (17th)	–	389.2 (21st)	–		
California	336.8 (27th)	–	423.6 (16th)	Finalist		
Colorado	409.6 (14th)	Finalist	420.2 (17th)	Finalist	–	Awarded $18 million
Connecticut	344.6 (25th)	–	379.0 (25th)	–		
Delaware	454.6 (1st)	Awarded $100 million	–	–		
District of Columbia	402.4 (16th)	Finalist	450.0 (6th)	Awarded $75 million		
Florida	431.4 (4th)	Finalist	452.4 (4th)	Awarded $700 million		
Georgia	433.6 (3rd)	Finalist	446.4 (8th)	Awarded $400 million		
Hawaii	364.6 (22nd)	–	462.4 (3rd)	Awarded $75 million		
Idaho	331.0 (28th)	–	Did not submit	–		
Illinois	423.8 (5th)	Finalist	426.6 (15th)	Finalist	–	Awarded $43 million
Indiana	355.6 (23rd)	–	Did not submit	–		
Iowa	346.0 (24th)	–	382.8 (22nd)	–		
Kansas	329.6 (29th)	–	Did not submit	–		
Kentucky	418.8 (9th)	Finalist	412.4 (19th)	Finalist	–	Awarded $17 million
Louisiana	418.2 (11th)	Finalist	434.0 (13th)	Finalist	–	Awarded $17 million
Maine	Did not submit	–	283.4 (33rd)	–		
Maryland	Did not submit	–	450.0 (6th)	Awarded $250 million		
Massachusetts	411.4 (13th)	Finalist	471.0 (1st)	Awarded $250 million		
Michigan	366.2 (21st)	–	381.6 (23rd)	–		
Minnesota	375.0 (20th)	–	Did not submit	–		
Mississippi	Did not submit	–	263.4 (34th)	–		
Missouri	301.4 (33rd)	–	316.4 (30th)	–		
Montana	Did not submit	–	238.4 (35th)	–		
Nebraska	247.4 (39th)	–	295.8 (31st)	–		
Nevada	Did not submit	–	381.2 (24th)	–		
New Hampshire	271.2 (38th)	–	335.2 (29th)	–		
New Jersey	387.0 (18th)	–	437.8 (11th)	Finalist	–	Awarded $38 million
New Mexico	325.2 (30th)	–	366.2 (28th)	–		
New York	408.6 (15th)	Finalist	464.8 (2nd)	Awarded $700 million		
North Carolina	414.0 (12th)	Finalist	441.6 (9th)	Awarded $400 million		
Ohio	418.6 (10th)	Finalist	440.8 (10th)	Awarded $400 million		
Oklahoma	294.6 (34th)	–	391.8 (20th)	–		
Oregon	292.6 (35th)	–	Did not submit	–		
Pennsylvania	420.0 (7th)	Finalist	417.6 (18th)	Finalist	–	Awarded $41 million
Rhode Island	419.0 (8th)	Finalist	451.2 (5th)	Awarded $75 million		
South Carolina	423.2 (6th)	Finalist	431.0 (14th)	Finalist		
South Dakota	135.8 (41st)	–	Did not submit	–		
Tennessee	444.2 (2nd)	Awarded $500 million	–	–		
Utah	379.4 (19th)	–	379.0 (25th)	–		
Vermont		–		–		
Virginia	324.8 (31st)	–	Did not submit	–		
Washington	Did not submit	–	290.6 (32nd)	–		
West Virginia	292.4 (36th)	–	Did not submit	–		
Wisconsin	341.2 (26th)	–	368.4 (27th)	–		
Wyoming	318.6 (32nd)	–	Did not submit	–		

Alaska, North Dakota, Texas, and Vermont did not submit Race to the Top applications for either round.

After both rounds, the Department of Education released the complete scoring of each application, with the intention of making the scoring process more transparent and helping states revise their applications to be more competitive for the second round of competition.

Round 1 (a.k.a. Phase 1) winners were announced on March 29, 2010. Round 2 (a.k.a. Phase 2) Winners were announced on August 24, 2010. Round 3 (a.k.a. Phase 3) Winners were announced on December 23, 2011.

== Results ==
As an parts of Race to the Top, the U.S. Department of Education puts out an Annual Performance Report (APR), cataloguing the grantees' progress in implementing reform plans and meeting goals for student outcomes.

APR's are created for each state to document the progress toward the annual and four-year targets set forth in the grantees' applications. Because the performance measures included in the applications are indicators of success in improving student outcomes, the APR is one way to hold states accountable for meeting targets in improving student outcomes. An APR also includes reports and updates on laws, statutes, regulations, and/or guidelines that impact reform plans, as well as progress in meeting the "absolute priority" and "competitive preference priority", which emphasize a comprehensive focus on reform and an emphasis on STEM education. The APR includes updates on progress in meeting the invitation priorities in the approved plans (innovations for improving early learning outcomes; expansion and adaptation of statewide longitudinal data systems; P-20 coordination, vertical and horizontal alignment; and school-level conditions for reform, innovation, and learning).

The APR measures things like graduating rates. Graduation rates for the states that received grants (grants were awarded in 2010 and late 2011):

Graduation rates for grant-winning states

State	2009–10	2010–11	2011–12	2012–13	2013–14	2014–15
Delaware	87.0%	78.0%	80.0%	80.4%	87.0%	85.6%
Washington DC	76.0%	59.0%	59.0%	62.3%	61.4%	68.5%
Florida	78.0%	71.0%	75.0%	75.6%	76.1%	77.9%
Georgia	81.0%	67.0%	70.0%	71.7%	72.5%	78.8%
Maryland	87.0%	83.0%	84.0%	85.0%	86.4%	87.0%
Massachusetts	82.0%	83.0%	85.0%	85.0%	86.1%	87.3%
New York	76.0%	77.0%	77.0%	76.8%	77.8%	79.2%
North Carolina	74.0%	78.0%	80.0%	82.5%	83.9%	85.6%
Ohio	84.0%	80.0%	81.0%	82.2%	81.8%	80.7%
Rhode Island	76.0%	77.0%	77.0%	79.7%	80.8%	83.2%
Tennessee	89.0%	86.0%	87.0%	86.3%	87.2%	87.9%

Race to the Top states like Georgia, North Carolina, and Florida successfully integrated multiple data systems to provide a range of tailored resources and information for different audiences (e.g., teachers, students, parents). In such integrated systems, students can access their assignments, grades and learning activities; parents can view the academic expectations of their child, and his or her school attendance and grades; and teachers and principals can access their students' data and find strategies and resources (e.g., sample lesson plans) to meet their instructional needs. Access to data and training that help teachers improve instruction to meet their students' needs.

Race to the Top states provided extensive training opportunities for teachers to increase their data analysis skills and use student performance data to customize learning for individual students. Teachers are using new data and tools to effectively and quickly check on students' progress and understanding in the course of a single session or over a few weeks.

== Criticisms ==
Although the vast majority of states have competed to win the grants, Race to the Top has also been criticized by politicians, policy analysts, thought leaders, and educators. Teachers' unions argued that state tests are an inaccurate way to measure teacher effectiveness, considering the fact that learning gains on assessments is only one component of the evaluation systems. Conservatives complained that it imposes federal overreach on state schools, and others argued that charter schools weaken public education. In explaining why Texas would not be applying for Race to the Top funding, then Governor Rick Perry stated, "we would be foolish and irresponsible to place our children's future in the hands of unelected bureaucrats and special interest groups thousands of miles away in Washington."

Critics further contend that the reforms being promoted are unproven or have been unsuccessful in the past. Former Assistant Secretary of Education Diane Ravitch, for example, commented that empirical evidence "shows clearly that choice, competition and accountability as education reform levers are not working". A coalition of civil rights organizations, including the Urban League, the NAACP Legal Defense Fund and the Rainbow/PUSH Coalition released a statement that "Such an approach reinstates the antiquated and highly politicized frame for distributing federal support to states that civil rights organizations fought to remove in 1965." The Economic Policy Institute released a report in April 2010 finding that "the selection of Delaware and Tennessee was subjective and arbitrary, more a matter of bias or chance than a result of these states' superior compliance with reform policies". Finally, the American Enterprise Institute released a report in September 2010 finding disparities in Race to the Top scores versus the education reform track records and ratings of states from outside, independent sources. This report finds that states' political circumstances may have influenced states' final scores.

On May 26, 2010, Virginia Governor Bob McDonnell withdrew the state from the second round of the competition. Virginia finished 31st out of 41 states in the first round, but McDonnell said that Virginia would not continue for the second round, believing the competition required the use of common education performance standards instead of Virginia's current standards. The use of common performance standards is required. Although McDonnell supported the Race to the Top program during his campaign for governor, he claimed on his June 1 appearance on MSNBC that the Race to the Top rules precluded participating states from adopting more rigorous standards in addition to whatever multi-state standards they join. However, in some cases, "Race to the Top" regulations award the points even if states adopt standards more rigorous than the optional, common standards.

== See also ==
- Nudge theory
- R2T
