= Teacher quality assessment =

Teacher quality assessment commonly includes reviews of qualifications, tests of teacher knowledge, observations of practice, and measurements of student learning gains. Assessments of teacher quality are currently used for policymaking, employment and tenure decisions, teacher evaluations, merit pay awards, and as data to inform the professional growth of teachers.

== Qualifications, credentials, and teacher characteristics ==
Teacher qualifications include a range of variables affecting teacher quality, including type of teaching certification, undergraduate major or minor, undergraduate institution, advanced degrees or certifications (such as certification through the National Board for Professional Teaching Standards and Centre for Teacher Accreditation (CENTA), type of preparation program (traditional or alternate route), test scores (various subject matter, licensure, or verbal skills tests), and years of teaching experience. In many countries, teaching credentials represent the main measure of teacher quality. In the United States, one goal of the No Child Left Behind law is to ensure that all teachers meet state-defined standards of highly qualified teachers. Demographic characteristics such as a teacher's gender, race, ethnicity, or socioeconomic background may also be characterized as elements of teacher quality as variables impacting student outcomes. These indicators of teacher quality are relatively straightforward to ascertain, as opposed to the student achievement and teacher observation measures described below.

== Student achievement measures ==
Teacher quality with regard to student achievement—also known as "teacher effectiveness"—is measured in terms of student achievement gains. Most extant research on teacher quality pertains to observable attributes, preparation, and credentials (Goldhaber, 2002; McCaffrey et al., 2003; Neild and Ripple, 2008). Probably the most widely studied attributes are experience and education levels, in part because the data can be readily obtained because of their use in salary placement (Goldhaber, 2002). There is mixed evidence, however, that experience and education levels are associated with student learning (Goldhaber, 2002; Goldhaber and Brewer, 1997, 2000; Hanushek, 1997; Wenglinsky, 2002). Student achievement is measured through the use of standardized tests to determine the academic growth of students over time. Recently, a type of analysis of this growth termed "value-added modeling," following the 1971 approach of Eric Hanushek. has sought to isolate the fraction of student achievement gains attributable to individual teachers, or in some cases groups of teachers.

However, it has been argued that student achievement measures do not necessarily correlate entirely with teacher quality, given that there are various factors that influence a student's performance which is not under the control of a teacher.

== Teacher practice ==
Assessments of teacher quality may also draw upon evidence collected from observations of teachers' work that lead to the empowering of effective teachers. This evidence may be collected from in-person or video-recorded observations of teaching, pre- and post-observation conferences with teachers, and samples of teachers' work with students. Assessments of teacher practice may examine teacher quality for a single lesson or over an entire school year. Such assessments may be holistic or narrative in form, but in rubric-based systems of teacher assessment like the Framework for Teaching, and Classroom Assessment Scoring System (CLASS) have become increasingly more common in the United States in order to align with state and federal accountability requirements. Many school districts have developed their own rubrics for this purpose, such as the IMPACT system used in the District of Columbia public schools. Other practice-based assessments of teacher quality require teachers themselves to assemble evidence and self-assess their own indicators of teacher quality according to rubrics as part of the process. Examples include the Performance Assessment for California Teachers (PACT) and its national successor the edTPA, the Oregon-based Teacher Work Sample. and the collection of assessments required by teachers seeking certification from the National Board for Professional Teaching Standards.

== Teacher experience ==
The way that most current teacher compensation systems are set up is to reward teachers with salary increases for every year of additional experience they gain. The research literature on the predictive power of teacher experience for student achievement gains, however, reveals modest effects of experience limited to the first few years of a teacher's career. Research by Hanushek, Kain, O'Brien, and Rivkin (2005), Kane et al. (2006), and Rockoff (2004) suggests that teacher effectiveness grows in the initial four or five years in the classroom and then begins to level off.

== Teacher evaluation approaches ==
Teacher evaluation is a process used to measure teacher effectiveness based on students learning and success. Evaluations of teachers over the years have changed. In earlier years, teacher evaluations were based on personal characteristics of the teacher, however, starting in the early 1950s until the 1980s, teacher evaluations took a shift and started to focus on teachers' teaching, observed through students' outcomes. After the 1980s, teacher evaluations were measured based on increased professional development, accountability, and school improvement.

Teacher evaluation has taken numerous approaches that observed teacher practices. Measures of Effective Teaching (MET), Danielson's Framework Model, Classroom Assessment Scoring System (CLASS), and the Value added Model (VAM) are all evaluation tools that aim to measure student achievement using teacher evaluation. MET evaluates teacher effectiveness through five measures: students' gains in standardized testing, recorded classroom sessions and teacher reflections afterwards, teachers' knowledge in the pedagogical content, students views of the classroom and instruction of the teacher, and the teachers own views on their working conditions and the support of the school.

While the MET approach uses five measures to evaluate teacher effectiveness, the Danielson Framework for Teaching model evaluates teachers using four domains: planning and preparation, classroom environment, instruction, and professional responsibilities. In this framework of evaluation, teachers are evaluated through a rubric that contains these four domains. They can either be ranked or measured as unsatisfactory, basic, proficient, or distinguished. In this rubric, teachers are being evaluated through critical attributes and examples when being observed. Teacher responses to this evaluation system have been positive because the evaluation system presented clear and specific standards. Administrators generally perceive the Danielson Framework as positive because of the rigorous and specific statement of standards. One concern that administrators have about using the Danielson Framework as the sole evaluation model is that teachers may alter their behavior only around observable classroom behaviors, limiting how representative the evaluations truly are. Many schools use Danielson's framework for teaching to assess teachers.

The CLASS approach, by Robert Pianta, evaluates teachers based on their interaction with students. To do this, the CLASS model evaluates teachers' interactions using three domains: emotional support, classroom organization, and instructional support. This approach is much more flexible, as the domains used within the approach vary based on students' grade levels.

On the other hand, the VAM approach uses students' test score gains to reflect teachers' effectiveness. Unlike the other approaches that evaluate particular characteristics or style of teaching for teacher evaluations, VAM does not directly evaluate the teacher. Although many of the approaches for teacher evaluations are debated, VAM is said to be inconsistent in its approach due to variation in classes, years, or test since its effectiveness measures are not based on teachers. However, it said that VAM measures are retroactively effective due to teacher practices that influence learning of students.

Finally, an organization in India called Centre for Teacher Accreditation (CENTA) uses two main steps in teacher certification and evaluation. The first step is an Objective Test which is based on the subject chosen, classroom practice, logical ability, communication etc. The second step is a Practical assessment which consists of an e-portfolio submission and a proctored assessment + interview. This evaluation and certification is based on CENTA standards that have been developed after several years of research and feedback.

== Course evaluation ==
A course evaluation is a paper or electronic questionnaire, which requires a written or selected response answer to a series of questions in order to evaluate the instruction of a given course. The term may also refer to the completed survey form or a summary of responses to questionnaires. New peer-reviewed empirical evidence by Bashirzadeh et al. (2025) shows that both the gender and age of the professor, as well as the cultural distance between the professor and the student, can impact the student's evaluation of the teaching.

== Educational evaluation ==
Educational evaluation is the evaluation process of characterizing and appraising some aspect/s of an educational process.

== See also ==
- Advanced Skills Teacher, a designation for teachers in maintained schools in England and Wales who have demonstrated excellent teaching practice as determined through external assessment against a range of criteria.
- Lee S. Shulman, an educational psychologist who has made substantial contributions to the study of teacher education and assessment of teaching
- RateMyProfessors.com
