= Richard Rothstein =

American historian (born 1939)

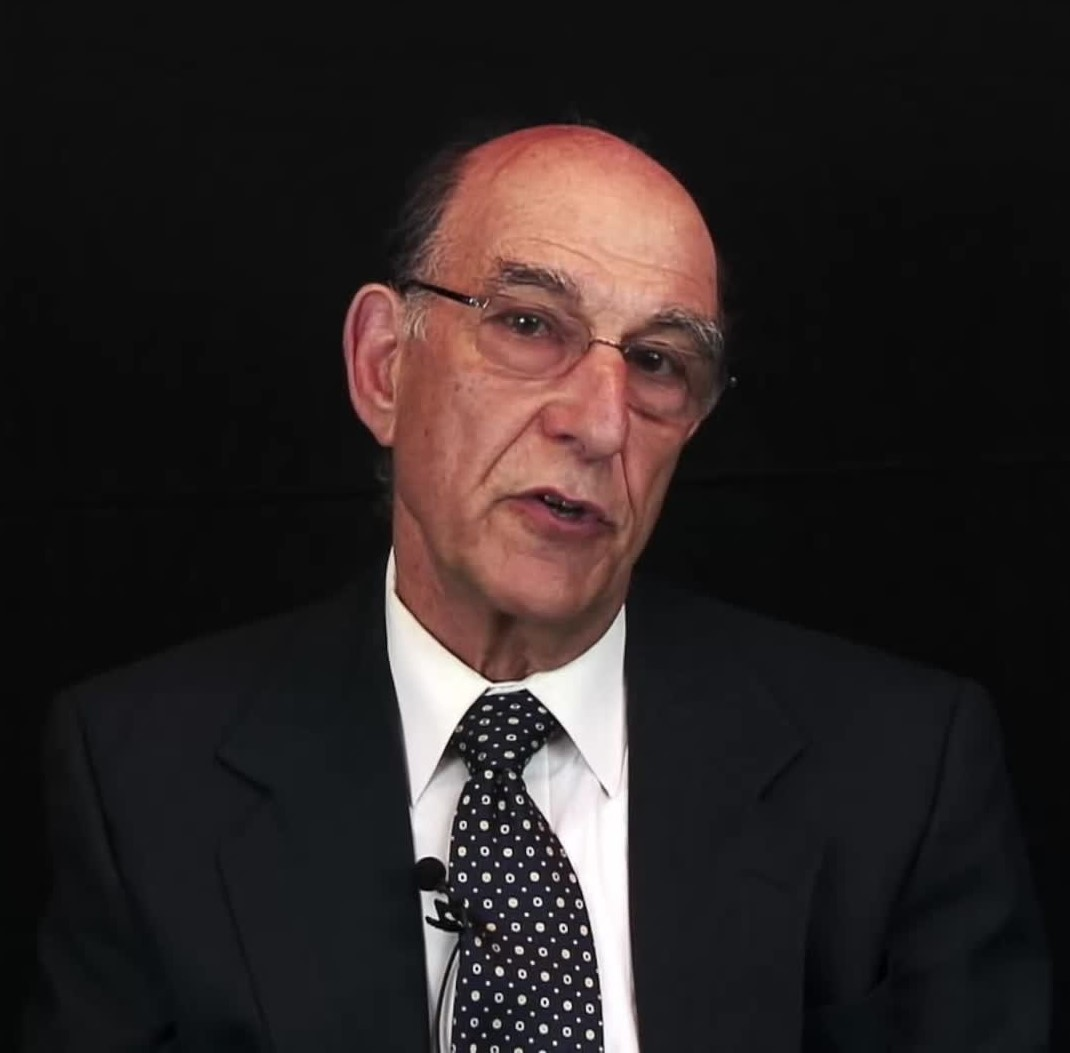
- Rothstein in 2015
- Born: 1939 (age 86–87); New York
- Occupations: Historian, author
- Children: Jesse Rothstein; Leah Rothstein

Academic background
- Education: Harvard University

Academic work
- Discipline: Education and housing policy
- Notable works: The Color of Law
- Website: www.epi.org/people/richard-rothstein/

Richard Rothstein (born 1939) is an American academic and author affiliated with the Economic Policy Institute, and a senior fellow (emeritus) at the Thurgood Marshall Institute of the NAACP Legal Defense Fund. His current research focuses on the history of segregation in the United States with regard to education and housing.

== Career ==
Rothstein speaking on legal segregation in America in 2015

From 1999 until 2002, Rothstein was the national education columnist for The New York Times. and had been a senior fellow at the Chief Justice Earl Warren Institute on Law and Social Policy at the law school of the University of California, Berkeley until it closed in 2015. Rothstein was then affiliated with the Haas Institute at the University of California, Berkeley School of Law.

His 2017 book, The Color of Law: A Forgotten History of How Our Government Segregated America, argues that racial housing segregation is the result of government policy at all levels—federal, state, and local. Rothstein disagreed with the prevailing view affirmed by Supreme Court in the 1973 decision Miliken v. Bradley and a subsequent 2007 decision: that housing segregation is primarily the result of private racism and decisions. A review in The New York Times said that there was "no better history" of housing segregation, while Rachel Cohen of Slate called The Color of Law "essential."

In 2023, Rothstein published Just Action: How to Challenge Segregation Enacted Under the Color of Law alongside his daughter, Leah Rothstein. The book evaluates the actions local communities can take to combat segregation.

== Bibliography ==
- The Way We Were? Myths and Realities of America's Student Achievement (1998)
- All Else Equal: Are Public and Private Schools Different? (co-authored in 2003)
- Class and Schools (2004)
- The Charter School Dust-Up: Examining the Evidence on Enrollment and Achievement (co-authored in 2005)
- Grading Education: Getting Accountability Right (2008)
- The Color of Law: A Forgotten History of How Our Government Segregated America (2017)
- Just Action: How to Challenge Segregation Enacted Under the Color of Law (with Leah Rothstein) (2023)
