= Jesse Rothstein =

American economist and academic

Academic background
- Education: A.B. (1995), Harvard University; M.P.P.(2003), Ph.D. (2003), University of California, Berkeley
- Doctoral advisor: David Card
- Influences: Richard Rothstein

Academic work
- Discipline: Labor economics, Education economics
- Institutions: University of California, Berkeley, Princeton University
- Website: https://eml.berkeley.edu/~jrothst/; Information at IDEAS / RePEc

Jesse Rothstein is an economist, and currently professor of public policy and economics at the University of California, Berkeley. In 2010, he was chief economist at the US Department of Labor. He is the founding director of the California Policy Lab, a research associate of the National Bureau of Economic Research, and is a member of the editorial boards of Education Finance and Policy, The Review of Economics and Statistics, American Economic Review, and Industrial Relations.

== Selected works ==
- Rothstein, Jesse. "Teacher quality in educational production: Tracking, decay, and student achievement." The Quarterly Journal of Economics 125, no. 1 (2010): 175–214.
- Card, David, Alexandre Mas, and Jesse Rothstein. "Tipping and the Dynamics of Segregation." The Quarterly Journal of Economics 123, no. 1 (2008): 177–218.
- Card, David, and Jesse Rothstein. "Racial segregation and the black–white test score gap." Journal of Public Economics 91, no. 11-12 (2007): 2158–2184.
- Rothstein, Jesse. "Student sorting and bias in value-added estimation: Selection on observables and unobservables." Education Finance and Policy 4, no. 4 (2009): 537–571.
- Rothstein, Jesse M. "College performance predictions and the SAT." Journal of Econometrics 121, no. 1-2 (2004): 297–317.
