= Brian Jacob =

American economist

Brian Aaron Jacob

Academic background
- Education: University of Chicago (Ph.D.); Harvard University (B.A.)
- Doctoral advisor: Steven Levitt

Academic work
- Discipline: Labour and Education economics
- Institutions: University of Michigan

Brian Aaron Jacob is an American economist and a professor of public policy, economics, and education at the Gerald R. Ford School of Public Policy of the University of Michigan. There, he also currently serves as co-director of the Youth Policy Lab. In 2008, Jacob's research on education policy was awarded the David N. Kershaw Award, which is given by the Association for Public Policy Analysis and Management and honors persons who have made a distinguished contribution to the field of public policy analysis and management before the age of 40. His doctoral advisor at the University of Chicago was Freakonomics author Steven Levitt.

== Biography ==
Brian A. Jacob earned an A.B. from Harvard College in 1992, after which he worked as a policy analyst for the office of the New York City Mayor (1992–94) and as an elementary school teacher at the Zora Neale Hurston Academy (East Harlem) (1994–96). In 2001, Jacob earned a Ph.D. from the Harris School of Public Policy at the University of Chicago, whereupon he began to work as assistant professor at the Kennedy School of Government. In 2007, following a visiting appointment at the University of Michigan, Jacob moved to Michigan's Gerald R. Ford School of Public Policy, where he became the Walter H. Annenberg Professor of Education Policy, Professor of Economics and Professor of Education. At the University of Michigan, Jacob also served as director of the Center for Local, State and Urban Policy (2007–12) and the Education Policy Initiative (2012-2021). He currently serves as a co-director of the Youth Policy Lab.

In terms of professional affiliations, Jacob was affiliated with the National Poverty Center and continues to maintain ties to the National Bureau of Economic Research, CESifo Research Network, and Brookings Institution. Moreover, he is a member of the American Economic Association, American Educational Research Association, and the Association for Public Policy Analysis and Management. Finally, he has been performing editorial duties at the academic journals Education Finance and Policy, Review of Economics and Statistics, and American Economic Journal: Applied Economics.

== Research ==
Brian A. Jacob's research focuses on the labor markets of teachers, school accountability and choice, and housing and criminal justice (among other topics). In his research, Jacob has very frequently collaborated with Lars Lefgren (Brigham Young University), with whom he studied together at the University of Chicago.

=== Research on teacher labor markets ===
In his research on teacher labor markets, Jacob has studied the recruitment and training of effective teachers. Together with Lefgren, Jacob finds that raising teachers' in-service training has no significant effect on students' achievement in reading or math, raising questions on whether small-scale staff development investments are an effective strategy in high-poverty schools. Again with Lefgren, Jacob has also researched the recruitment of effective teachers by school principals, finding that principals are generally able to identify ineffective teachers but are much less able to distinguish between teachers of lower or upper intermediate effectiveness. Nonetheless, a principal's subjective assessment is on average a far better predictor of a teacher's students' future achievement than the teacher's experience, education and compensation, though it performs worse than measures of the teacher's value added to student test scores. Jacob has further investigated this issue in research with Rockoff, Kane and Staiger, wherein he finds that composite measures of teachers' cognitive and non-cognitive skills predict well teachers' effectiveness, though individual measures do not. Finally, reviewing the literature on the recruitment of effective teachers in urban schools, Jacob emphasizes the variation of teacher shortages across subjects, grades and schools, with recruitment being particularly difficult for high-poverty schools.

=== Research on school accountability and school choice ===
Another area of research by Brian A. Jacob in education regards school choice and school accountability. With Steven Levitt, Jacob uses unexpected test score fluctuations to assess teacher cheating in Chicago public schools and estimates that cheating by teachers or school administrators on standardized tests occurs in at least 4-5% of elementary school classrooms, with the frequency of cheating responding strongly to minor changes in incentives, which constitutes a key pitfall of high-powered incentive systems in education. In another study on high-stakes testing, Jacob finds however that math and reading achievement grew strongly after the introduction of school accountability policies under the No Child Left Behind (NCLB), though part of the achievement growth in these subjects is found to come at the expense of low-stakes subjects such as science and social studies, as teachers substitute these for the tested subjects. Jacob further investigates the impact of NCLB on students, teachers and schools in two studies with Thomas Dee, wherein they find that it increased younger students' test scores in math, especially among disadvantaged youth, though not in reading, caused school-district expenditure to grow, and improved the quality of the teacher workforce, but also shifted teachers' focus towards the tested subjects and away from those that weren't. Together with Julie Berry Cullen and Steven Levitt, Jacob has also researched school choice in the Chicago Public Schools (CPS), finding that - except for students choosing career academies - the observed gains in high school graduation rates among students who switch from their assigned CPS high school to another one is likely spurious, and that even though students who win high school lotteries tend to have selected higher quality schools and consequently report fewer disciplinary incidents, their student achievement doesn't benefit significantly from their win. Finally, in research with Lars Lefgren, Jacob has analyzed remedial education, parents' preferences regarding teaching, and the impact of grade retention. In particular, using a regression discontinuity design, they find that summer school remedial education within CPS substantially increased 3rd-graders' but not 6th-graders academic achievement, that families with children in high-poverty schools strongly value teachers' ability to raise their children's scores in standardized math or reading tests and don't care about teachers' ability to promote student satisfaction, whereas the reverse holds true for families with children in high-income schools, and that retaining in grade 8th-grade students in elementary school substantially increases their likelihood of dropping out of high school, whereas the retention of younger students has no such effect.

=== Research on housing and criminal justice ===
In his research on housing and criminal justice, Jacob studies the impact of public housing on education as well as the determinants of youth criminal behavior. In his investigation of the impact of high-rise public housing on student outcomes through the demolition of public housing in Chicago, Jacob finds that the outcomes of students living in affected households don't change, as their families move from public housing to neighborhoods with schools strongly similar to the ones that the students attended previously, suggesting that the benefits of housing mobility for the education of disadvantaged students may be small. Examining the short-term impact of school on crime, Jacob and Lefgren find that property crime decreases by 14% during school time, whereas violent crime increases by 28%, suggesting that incapacitation and concentration affect juvenile crime but that the increase in interactions associated with school attendance increases interpersonal conflict and violence, which would imply important trade-offs with regard to youth programs with frequent interactions. Finally, along with Enrico Moretti, Jacob and Lefgren use weather shocks to study the dynamics of criminal behavior, finding - unlike previous research - that criminal behavior displays natural mean reversion, thus casting doubt on the long-run effects of temporary crime prevention efforts.

=== Miscellaneous research ===
Other findings of Jacob's research include the lack of significant impact of mandatory high school graduation exams on 12th-grade students' achievement in math or reading, though they increase the likelihood of the students with the lowest ability dropping out of school. Further analysis by Jacob with Thomas Dee has shown that the impact of mandatory high school graduation exams is highly diverse, e.g. increasing educational attainment in low-poverty and suburban school districts but also exacerbating dropout rates in high-poverty school districts or districts with high concentrations of minority students. Examining why nearly 3 out of 5 college students are women, Jacob finds that nearly 90% of the gender gap in higher education can be accounted for by gender differences in non-cognitive skills (e.g. the ability to pay attention in class, to cooperate, to organize and to seek help) and college premia. Finally, in his research with Lefgren on the impact of receiving an NIH grant on later publications and citations, Jacob finds that receiving such a grant only moderately increases applicants' research productivity, suggesting that researchers may have access to other funding sources for high quality projects and that an NIH grant is unlikely to displace other funding by NIH.
