= Center for Education Policy Analysis =

US research center

- Abbreviation: CEPA
- Formation: 2009
- Type: Research center
- Purpose: To study education policy in the United States
- Director: Thomas Dee
- Parent organization: Stanford Graduate School of Education
- Website: cepa.stanford.edu

The Center for Education Policy Analysis (CEPA) is a research center at the Stanford Graduate School of Education dedicated to action-oriented research on education policies. CEPA's research focuses on the impact of poverty and inequality on educational achievement, the evaluation of federal and state education policy, teaching and leadership effectiveness, and technological innovations in education. CEPA was established in 2009 as part of the Stanford Challenge, a multidisciplinary initiative at Stanford University aimed at improving K-12 education. It is ranked as the 10th most influential education policy think tank worldwide by the Think Tanks and Civil Societies Program.

== Activities ==
The main focus of CEPA's activities is on performing research on education policies in the United States. These research activities are mediated through a series of research projects, including:

- Stanford Education Data Archive
- Early Childhood Education and Care
- CEPA Labs
- Educational Opportunity Monitoring Project
- Teaching & Learning in Online College Courses
- Changing Ecology of Higher Education
- Getting Down to Facts
- Quality Teacher and Education Act in San Francisco (QTEA)
- School Leadership Research
- Stereotype Threat and Achievement Gaps in Middle School
- Teacher Policy Research

The outcomes of these research projects are published by CEPA in the form of reports, working papers, journal articles, and books. Additionally, CEPA also offers training programmes for doctorate candidates, postdoctoral fellowships and research assistantships for undergraduates.

== Steering Committee ==
- Thomas Dee
- Susanna Loeb
- Michelle Reininger
- Eric Bettinger
- Sean Reardon
- Jelena Obradovic
- Benjamin Domingue

== Faculty ==
- Martin Carnoy
- Geoffrey L. Cohen
- Thomas Ehrlich
- Eric Hanushek
- Ed Haertel
- Caroline Hoxby
- Michael W. Kirst
- William Koski
- Prashant Loyalka
- David Plank
- Rob Reich
- Mitchell L. Stevens
- Deborah Stipek
