= Jonah Rockoff =

U.S.-American education economist

Jonah E. Rockoff
- Occupation: American education economist

Jonah E. Rockoff is an American education economist and currently works as Professor of Finance and Economics at the Columbia Graduate School of Business. Rockoff's research interests include the economics of education and public finance. His research on the management of public schools has been awarded the 2016 George S. Eccles Research Award in Finance and Economics by Columbia Business School.

== Biography ==
Jonah Rockoff earned a B.A. in economics from Amherst College in 1997, followed by a Ph.D. in economics from Harvard University in 2004. Since his graduation, Rockoff has taught and researched at the Columbia Graduate School of Business, first as assistant professor (2004–07), then as associate professor (2008–16), and since 2016 as full professor. Rockoff is affiliated with the National Bureau of Economic Research, Institute of Education Sciences, National Science Foundation, and the Smith Richardson Foundation. Moreover, he works as co-editor of the Journal of Public Economics.

== Research ==
Jonah Rockoff's research focuses on teachers, in particular the measurement of teachers' impact, and public schools.

=== Research on teachers ===
Revolving themes in Rockoff's research on teachers are teachers' effectiveness and the recruitment and retention of effective teachers. For example, he estimates that increasing teacher quality by one standard deviation raises reading and math test scores by approximately 0.20 and 0.24 standard deviations, respectively, and reading scores are found to increase in teachers' experience. Similarly, together with Boyd, Loeb, Wyckoff and Lankford, Rockoff finds that the NYC Teaching Fellows and Teach for America initiatives were able to substantially reduce the gap between the average qualifications of teachers at New York City's low- and high-poverty schools by substituting uncertified teachers in high-poverty schools by academically qualified teachers. Together with Kane and Staiger, Rockoff has also studied how to recruit effective teachers. In particular, they find that—unlike teachers' performance in classrooms during the first two years—teacher certification poorly predicts teachers' future effectiveness, and that composite measures of teachers' cognitive and non-cognitive skills predict well teachers' effectiveness, though individual measures do not (with Brian Jacob). This research is complemented by work with Cecilia Speroni, wherein he principals' subjective evaluations of teacher effectiveness to be good predictors of teachers' objective effectiveness. Next to teacher recruitment, Rockoff's research on teacher retention has found that mentoring among NYC teachers has only a weak effect on teachers' turnover, absenteeism and their students' achievements, though there is some evidence that mentoring successfully improves school-specific knowledge and teaching skills. Overall, Rockoff's views on the recruitment, evaluation and retention of teachers in the U.S. are summarized in a JEP article with Staiger, wherein they highlight five empirical findings: (1) teachers' impact on student achievement vary strongly; (2) measures of teacher effectiveness based on student test scores are unreliable; (3) teachers' effectiveness increases degressively over their careers; (4) the main issue related to teacher turnover is the loss in student achievement as students are taught by less experienced teachers rather than the direct cost of hiring and firing teachers; and (5) identifying effective teachers at the time of recruitment—as opposed to based on their actual job performance—is very difficult.

More recently, Rockoff and his co-researchers Raj Chetty and John Friedman have researched better ways to measure the effectiveness of teachers, with a focus on the value added methodology. They find that value-added provides unbiased estimates of teachers' impacts on student achievement and that teachers with high value-added improve students' adulthood outcomes, with a one standard deviation increase in a teacher's value-added in a single grade corresponding to a 1% increase in earnings of her students' earnings by age 28.

=== Research on public schools, crime and housing ===
Next to his research on teachers, Rockoff has also studied public schools, the impact of sex offender registration, and the relationship between crime risk and property values. Together with Damon Clark and Paco Martorell, Rockoff finds scant evidence for a relationship between school performance and principals' education and work experience, though there is a benefit to having worked as assistant principal beforehand and students' test scores improve as principal experience increases, suggesting principal retention as an important policy issue. In his research with Caroline Hoxby on the impact of charter schools on student achievement, Rockoff finds that charter school attendance improves elementary school students' scores in math and reading by ca. six percentile point ranks. In work with Leigh Linden, Rockoff observes that house prices within 0.1 miles of a sex offender fall on average by 4%. Finally, in research with J.J. Prescott, Rockoff finds that both sex offender registration and notification reduce the frequency of reported sex offenses against local victims, though the former acts by keeping police informed about local sex offenders, whereas the latter deters non-registered offenders and actually may exacerbate recidivism.
