= Class-size reduction =

Aim to increase student-teacher interactions

As an educational reform goal, class size reduction (CSR) aims to increase the number of individualized student-teacher interactions intended to improve student learning. A reform long holding theoretical attraction to many constituencies, some have claimed CSR as the most studied educational reform of the last century. Until recently, interpretations of these studies have often been contentious. Some educational groups, like the American Federation of Teachers and National Education Association are in favor of reducing class sizes. Others argue that class size reduction has little effect on student achievement. Many are concerned about the costs of reducing class sizes.

The two most prominent CSR studies are Project STAR, which was conducted in the mid- to late-80s in Tennessee and Project SAGE, conducted in the early 2000s in Wisconsin. Studies following the work of Project STAR and SAGE found that, even when reintroduced to larger class-sizes later in their educational career, the positive foundation for learning caused students to later in life to be more likely to take advanced classes, graduate from high school, attend college, and major in a STEM field.

Subsequent research on the effects of class size reduction has linked small class sizes with a variety of cognitive and non-cognitive benefits for students and teachers, both short and long-term, especially when class sizes are reduced in the early grades (K–3). Its benefits are particularly pronounced for lower-income students and children of color, who experience two to three times the gains from smaller classes, leading CSR to be one of only a few education reforms proven to reduce the achievement gap. Smaller classes have also been found to have a positive impact on school climate, student socio-emotional growth, safety and suspension rates, parent engagement, and teacher attrition, especially in schools with large numbers of disadvantaged children.

== Definition of class size ==
An early complication in measuring the efficacy of class size reduction was the tendency for different ideological camps to use different definitions of class size in the literature. As a direct measure of the number of students in each class, group size is currently understood by the educational community to be the best measure of a teacher's "true opportunity to build direct relationships with each student." A more malleable definition and one now held in dubious regard, pupil to teacher ratio, would declare a situation in which one teacher leads a class while another does paperwork in the back but does not interact with students as being half as large as its group size.

In the past, depending on which measure was used, researchers tended toward far different interpretations of the benefits of class size reduction leading to far different recommendations for implementation. In 2002, Margaret Spellings, secretary of education under President George W. Bush, pointed out the need for a standardized definition of what is meant by class size.

To differentiate student-teacher ratio and class size, it is important to know several key distinctions. Class size, generally speaking, refers to the average class size in a given grade level of a given school. Student-teacher ratios, normally, are calculated by taking the total number of teachers at a given school divided by the complete enrollment of that school. This distinction is significant, because the ratio will not always match up with the class size figure (or vice versa). For example, a student-teacher ratio may be small but a class size may be larger than what the student-teacher ratio leads one to believe.

== Project STAR and Project SAGE ==
=== Project STAR ===
Aware of both the preliminary results of a CSR program in Indiana called Project Prime Time and the potential large scale costs of additional classrooms and teachers, in 1985, under then Governor Lamar Alexander, Tennessee began a three-phase project to determine the effects of reduced class sizes on short and long term pupil performance in the earliest grades.

The first phase, termed Project STAR (Student-Teacher Achievement Ratio), randomly assigned teachers and students to three groups, “small” (13 to 17), “regular” (22 to 25) classes with a paid aide, and “regular” (22 to 25) classes with no aide. In total some 6,500 students in about 330 classrooms at approximately 80 schools participated.

Using both standardized and curriculum based testing, the initial study concluded that small classes produced “substantial improvement in early learning and cognitive studies” with the effect about double for minority students. As this is considered the seminal study (in an area that has received much political attention) there have been many attempts to reinterpret the data.

Dubbed the Lasting Benefits Study, the second phase began in 1989 and sought to determine whether the benefits of CSR persisted into upper grades when all students entered standard size classes. Observations confirmed that children originally enrolled in smaller classes continued to outperform their peers when they returned to regular-sized classrooms. These results were deemed true for all types of classes and all types of cities (rural, suburban, and metropolitan).

Under the third phase, Project Challenge, the 17 economically poorest school districts were adequately funded to provide smaller class sizes for their K–3 students. These districts improved their end-of-year- standing (among 139 districts) in mathematics and reading from below average to above average.

Dr. Eric Hanushek has called into question the validity of the study on Project STAR, arguing that the bulk of scientific research on small-class sizes shows no or statistically insignificant effects and that there must be another explanation, like flawed random assignment, that produced the result rather than small class size. However, subsequent research has questioned Hanushek's claim that "there is no strong or consistent relationship between school inputs and student performance". Dr. Alan Krueger reanalyzed the data on which Hanushek based this claim and found that Hanushek "places a disproportionate share of weight on a small number of studies that frequently used small samples and estimated misspecified models." When this is corrected, the literature actually reveals a strong correlation between reduced class size and academic performance and suggests that the internal rate of return from reducing class size from 22 to 15 students is around 6 percent. In more recent years, Hanushek has defended his work in his book "Money Might Matter Somewhere", in which he argues that the amount of money spent per pupil is not as important a factor towards student achievement inasmuch as how the money is spent. In other words, Hanushek argues that giving a student $10,000 worth of pens and pencils would not impact their overall student achievement as much as, say, a $10,000 investment into training and development for that student's teacher.

=== Project SAGE ===
In 2002 the state of Wisconsin began its own investigations into “the wisdom of class size reduction," by initiating Project SAGE (Student Achievement Guarantee in Education). In all, nine low income schools were studied, their locations spanning urban, semi-urban, and rural geographies. Evaluation included site visits, standardized assessments, collection of curriculum, and interviews with teachers, principals, and students.

The guiding assumptions of the study were:

(1) Class size implementation alone is insufficient to promote student achievement. Changes in teaching methods that take full advantage of smaller class sizes will also be needed.

(2) Class size reduction may have unintended consequences.

(3) Generalization requires careful adaptation. Every classroom has a unique and specific context.

One primary difficulty encountered by the SAGE project was the availability of funds for teachers but not space. Each district was then left to this potential problem in their own unique way. In schools constrained by space this often involved tag-team teaching rather than increased individualized instruction (lowering of PTR but not class size).

Results from the study demonstrated increased teacher satisfaction with job, increased communication with parents, and (as with Project STAR) long term increases in student graduation rates and admission into college. Although no significant differences were observed in the gains of both male and female students, improved outcomes were again larger amongst minority and disadvantaged students.

== Other CSR studies ==
=== Project PRIME TIME ===
Project PRIME TIME was proposed in 1981 by former Indiana Governor Robert D. Orr. The intent was to upgrade the quality of early school experiences by reducing class sizes. The Indiana General Assembly appropriated $300,000 for the 1981–82 and 1982–82 school years to pilot PRIME TIME in nine schools, grades K–3, across Indiana. In 1983, the General Assembly increased PRIME TIME's funding for 1983–84 and 1984–85 to $2 million. This increased funding allowed for PRIME TIME's expansion in first grade. The program was expanded to second grade in 1985 and by the fall of 1987, it covered kindergarten through third grade.

Results from the study showed:

1. PRIME TIME students made improvements in reading and math standardized tests in kindergarten, first and second grades.
2. Students in PRIME TIME classes had fewer behavioral issues, better self-esteem and responsibility, greater time on task, and were less likely to be held back a grade.
3. Teachers of smaller class sizes reported themselves as more productive and efficient, had improved morale and better communication with parents, and were able to increase individualized attention to students.

=== Benefits in the UK ===
In a British study, students were closely observed by teams of researchers who recorded their “moment to moment” behaviors in blocks of 10-second intervals. The researchers found that adding five students to a class decreased the odds of students’ being on task by nearly a quarter. In classes of 30, low-attaining students were nearly twice as likely to be disengaged as they were in classes of 15.

Contrary to some class-size studies conducted in the United States, the British researchers found no “threshold effect” in their study. In other words, classes did not have to be reduced to 15 or 20 students before the behavioral benefits started to kick in. Reducing class size at any end of the class-size spectrum seemed to help.

=== California K–3 CSR Program ===
The California K–3 CSR Program was established in 1996 to improve education, especially in reading and mathematics, by reducing class sizes in kindergarten through grade three. The K–3 CSR Program provided funds to public and charter schools that reduced their class sizes to 20 pupils per certified teacher, rewarding each school with $850 per student that was in one of these smaller classes. As a result, the program was consuming 6% of the state's general education budget by 2001 and had, thus far, cost a total of $22 billion.

There has been a lot of controversy surrounding the program, with some critics arguing it had disappointing or null results. Because nearly all elementary schools in the state reduced class size at once, especially in grades K-2, it was difficult for researchers to find a control group with which to compare outcomes. The state exam was also new, making it difficult to compare achievement gains to past trends. Additionally, some researchers have noted that the program lacked adequate funding to be properly implemented. One serious drawback of this program is that it was much tougher for schools in lower-income communities to benefit as they were already struggling to retain high-quality teachers and maintain a sufficient quantity of classrooms. Thus, schools in higher-income communities, that already had average class sizes around 20 students, most benefited from this program—increasing inequality within the education system.

Despite these limitations and concerns, controlled studies of the effects of California's CSR program showed significant achievement gains from smaller classes, even among third graders who were only in the program for one year. Researchers found, for example, that students who were in reduced classes in grades K–3 had slightly higher scores on NAEP math exams in 4th grade than students from larger classes. The most significant result of this program was that class sizes, across the state, were, on average, reduced. Some other significant effects of the program were that teacher quality had decreased and the use of combination classes had increased. Teacher quality worsened because schools had to dig deeper down in the barrel to find teachers, who were typically less educated and less experienced. The percent of teachers not fully certified, yet teaching, in high-poverty schools increased from 6% in 1995 to 20% by 2001 and 1% to 6% in low-poverty schools. As to why achievement gains were greater for high-poverty minority students, the Coleman Report has a lot to say.

=== The Coleman Report ===
The Coleman Report, published in 1966, concluded that family background matters significantly more to a student's academic achievement than any resources a school can offer. The exact factors defining "family background" that this report focused on were "parents' educational attainment, parents' income, parents’ criminal history, and family structure". The report goes on to explain that it is equally important, if not more so, for public policy to focus on improving resources of the family rather than those of the school. This could suggest that policies attempting to reduce class size might not have as significant effects on a student's educational achievement as would a policy that reduces a student's level of poverty.

== Effects of CSR ==
Research on the effects of class size reduction has linked small class sizes with a variety of cognitive and non-cognitive benefits for students and teachers, both short and long-term, especially when class sizes are reduced in the early grades. In fact, class size reduction is one of only a handful of K12 reforms cited by the Institute of Education Sciences (2003) as proven to increase student achievement through rigorous evidence.

Reducing class size is among an even smaller number of education reforms that have been shown to narrow the achievement gap. Its benefits are particularly pronounced for lower-income students and children of color, who experience two to three times the gains from smaller classes.

Smaller classes have also been found to have a positive impact on school climate, student socio-emotional growth, safety and suspension rates, parent engagement, and teacher attrition, especially in schools with large numbers of disadvantaged children.

=== Academic achievement ===
- In a meta-analysis by Glass and Smith (1978), small class sizes (20 students or less) were associated with improved academic performance. Effects were strongest in the early primary grades and among low-income students.
- For a study commissioned by the US Department of Education, McLaughlin et al. (2000) analyzed the performance of students in over 2500 schools on state exams adjusted for difficulty via their scores on the NAEP (national) exams. The analysis showed that after controlling for student background, the only factor positively correlated with student test scores was the class size. In this study, student achievement was even more strongly linked to smaller classes in the upper than the lower grades.
- A literature review by Wilson (2002) noted that results from the Tennessee STAR study, a large-scale randomized experiment in grades K–3, showed that grade retention was lower for students in small classes: 17% of students from small classes were held back, compared with 30% and 44% respectively from ‘regular’ and ‘regular plus aide’ classes. Also, fewer students that had been in smaller classes in the early grade had dropped out of school by tenth grade.
- Using data from the Tennessee STAR study, Krueger (2003) demonstrated that smaller class sizes in grades K–3 led to significant gains in test scores and that the economic benefits from higher achievement alone would be expected to yield twice the cost of reducing class size.
- Finn et al. (2005) found that four years of a small class in K–3 improved the odds of graduating from high school by about 80%.
- Dynarski et al. (2013) concluded that smaller classes significantly increased the probability of a student attending college, earning a college diploma, and earning degrees in a STEM field (science, technology, engineering, or mathematics).
- A 2013 study in the Quarterly Journal of Economics found that smaller class sizes in Sweden had positive effects on educational outcomes and cognitive outcomes for students.
- A review by Zyngier (2014) of the research literature showed that smaller classes had a strong positive impact on student achievement and narrowing the achievement gap in the vast majority of studies. The benefits of smaller class size outweighed the cost in all but three of the 112 peer-reviewed studies.
- A 2020 study in the Journal of Human Resources found no evidence that class-size reductions in Norway had any significant impact on students' long-run educational outcomes and long-run economic outcomes.
- A Campbell Systematic Reviews meta-analysis examined the effect of class-size reduction on achievement and found small gains in reading and no evidence of gains in mathematics.
- A meta-analysis by Opatrny et al. (2025) collected 2,819 estimates from 66 studies and found little evidence of publication bias in this literature; the implied effect of class size on achievement was negligible except in designs like Tennessee STAR and in classes of fewer than 15 students.

=== Achievement gaps ===
- Based on STAR data, Krueger and Whitmore (2002) estimated that if all students were assigned to a small class in grades K–3 for one to four years, the black-white test-score gap would drop by 38 percent in grades K–3 and by 15 percent thereafter. They also estimated that national trends in pupil-teacher ratios for black and white students between 1971 and 1999 accounted for nearly all of the narrowing of the black-white test score gap over that period, as measured by the NAEP exam. In addition, they concluded that smaller classes in grades K–3 would lead to a narrowing of the black-white gap in taking college entrance exams by 60%, and would shrink the gap in scores on these exams.
- Dee (2004) looked at the effects of student-teacher racial mismatch on academic achievement in small classes. He found that while racial mismatch of teacher and student had negative effects on academic achievement in regular sized classes, this effect was absent in small classes.
- Finn et al. (2005) concluded that three years or more of small classes in the early grades increased the odds of graduating from high school of low-SES students by about 67%. Four years of small classes in the early grades more than doubled the odds. The graduation rates for low-income students with three or more years in a small class were at least as high as those of higher income students, closing the income gap.
- Konstantopoulos and Chung (2009) concluded that while all types of students benefit in later grades from being in small classes in early grades, low achievers benefited more, especially in reading and science.
- In a study examining the effect of a variety of inputs on student achievement in majority Latina/o schools, Heilig et al. (2010) found that the reduction in student-teacher ratios was the largest predictor of increases in student achievement.
- After analyzing Social Security data, Wilde et al. (2011) estimated that Black students who were randomly assigned to a small class size in the early grades had significantly higher employment rates and earnings as adults.
- Yongyun Shin (2012) found that for Black students, reduced class size in grades K–3 led to significantly higher academic achievement in reading, math, listening, and word recognition skills.
- Achilles (2012) concluded that poor, minority, and male students received especially large benefits from reduced class size in terms of improved test scores, school engagement, and lower grade retention and dropout rates.
- Dynarski et al. (2013) investigated the effects of small class sizes on postsecondary attainment and degree completion and estimated that assignment to small classes increased the probability of attending college by 2.7 percentage points, with effects more than twice as large among blacks. Among students with the lowest probability of attending college, the increase in college attendance was 11 percentage points.
- Schanzenbach (2014) summarized the benefits of class size reduction and its efficacy in narrowing the achievement gap in a report for the National Education Policy Center (NEPC). She concluded that significant savings would be produced from higher graduation rates and increased employment, particularly among low-income and minority groups.
- Zyngier's meta-analysis (2014) revealed that of 112 peer-reviewed studies, the overwhelming majority found that smaller classes helped to narrow the achievement gap.
- Mathis (2016) noted that the positive effects of class size reduction are twice as large for poor and minority students, in a literature review for the National Education Policy Center (NEPC) report.

=== Safety, attendance and disciplinary issues ===
- Wilson (2002) analyzed Tennessee STAR data, showing that there were lower suspension rates in later grades among students who had been in small classes in the early years. Tenth grade students who had been in small classes in K–3 were suspended on average 0.32 days, compared with 0.62 and 0.77 days for students in ‘regular’ and ‘regular plus aide’ classes respectively. Similarly, school attendance was significantly higher for tenth graders who had been assigned to small classes in the early years (16 days per year of absence compared to 23 and 24 for ‘regular’ and ‘regular plus aide’ classes).
- Krueger and Whitmore (2002) found that the teen birth rate was one third lower for white girls if they had been assigned to smaller classes in the early grades, and the teen fatherhood rate for black teenage males was 40% lower.
- In a review of the literature, Finn et al. (2003) analyzed 11 separate class size studies, and nearly all showed a positive impact of smaller classes on students' learning behavior, including decreases in anti-social behavior (i.e., withdrawing from interactions with the teacher or other students and/or engaging in disruptive acts) and increases in pro-social behavior (i.e., following rules and interacting positively with the teacher as well as collaborating with other children). In one class size study in North Carolina, disciplinary referrals decreased sharply in the two years after small classes were implemented, with a 26% drop in the first year and a 50% drop in the second year.

=== School climate and non-cognitive or socio-emotional factors ===
- Finn et al. (2003) analyzed the relationship between class size and learning behavior, social behavior, and teaching styles, showing a positive relationship between reduced class size and outcomes in all three areas. Reduced class size was linked with increased academic engagement, student effort, initiative taking in the classroom and time on task. Additionally, teachers of small classes were able to get to know each student more intimately and their tolerance for a broader range of student behaviors was increased.
- Babcock and Betts (2009) investigated the mechanism through which smaller classes boost academic achievement and found that small class sizes better enabled teachers to engage “low-effort” students, as defined by a below average tendency to begin work promptly, behave appropriately in class, exhibit self-discipline, and follow directions.
- Bascia (2010) summarized the impacts of class size reduction, noting that teachers were able to interact with individual students more frequently and use a greater variety of instructional and differentiated strategies. Students were more engaged and less disruptive in the classroom.
- In an analysis of national longitudinal data of eighth graders, Dee and West (2011) found that reductions in class size were associated with improvements in non-cognitive skills related to psychological engagement with school, more positive reactions to teachers, peers, and academics in general, higher levels of interest and motivation, lower levels of boredom and anxiety, and a greater sense of belonging. Students in small classes were more likely to look forward to class, believe that the subject was useful for their future, and were less afraid to ask questions.

=== Parent engagement ===
- Bohrnstedt and Stecher (1999) found that parents of students in reduced size classes had more contact with teachers and were more satisfied with their children's education. 74% of parents reported initiating contact with their children's teachers, compared with 69% of parents in non-reduced classes. Parents who had children in smaller classes also gave higher ratings to every aspect of their schooling.
- Bascia (2010) summarized a study conducted by the University of Alberta. After interviewing parents, researchers found that they were encouraged by being able to meet with teachers more frequently. The report also cited evidence from a study of Ontario's class size reduction initiative showing that many parents reported a better relationship with teachers when their children were assigned to a smaller class.

=== Teacher attrition ===
- According to a NY City Council survey (2004) of public school teachers, nearly a third (30%) of new teachers (1-5 years of experience) in NYC said that it was unlikely that they would be teaching in a NYC school in the next three years. For those teachers who were thinking of leaving NYC public schools, the top three changes in their work conditions most likely to persuade them to stay included a new contract with higher pay, smaller classes, and better student discipline.
- Loeb et al. (2005) examined data from teacher surveys and school-level data to determine the relationship between occupational conditions and teacher turnover. They found that the presence of very large classes significantly increased teacher turnover.
- A report from the Pennsylvania State Education Association (2008) noted that smaller classes improved teacher morale, which translates into higher rates of teacher attendance, reduced costs for substitute teachers and less teacher attrition.
- Pas Isenberg (2010) found that a decrease in class size from 23 to 20 students in New York State under a district-wide policy decreased the probability that a teacher would leave the school by 4.2 percentage points.
- Ingersoll (2015) noted that job dissatisfaction is the leading factor behind teacher turnover, with 54% of teachers who leave their school reporting that large class sizes contributed to their decision.

== Teacher training ==
Smaller classes provide opportunities for teachers to engage in practices that improve student achievement. However, some researchers worry whether teachers will take full advantage of these opportunities, arguing that they tend to use the same strategies (primarily lecturing) with both large and small groups. This concern has led some to advocate for teacher training to unlock the full potential of reduced class sizes.

Though teacher training may improve CSR outcomes, research has demonstrated the benefits of CSR even without any instructional changes. A book reviewing evidence and perspectives on class size from around the world concludes that "Project STAR produced gains without any changes in the curriculum or any focused teacher training. Small classes in and of themselves produced benefits," as was also the case in Wisconsin and California.

== Economics of smaller classrooms ==
Some commentators have encouraged policymakers to consider whether implementing or broadening class-size-reduction policies is feasible in a time of major budget cuts.

However, teacher magazine polls show that greater than 70% of current teachers cite large class sizes as one of their primary barriers to both job satisfaction and their ability to teach. This has led proponents of class size reduction argue that CSR is in fact highly cost effective. They note that low teacher retention rates lead to higher retraining costs and contribute to the current lack of qualified teachers. When faced with a constant flux of new teachers, student achievement has also been shown to suffer.

Students who go on to finish their education also bring more value to their communities causing some economists to suggest that smaller class sizes may pay for themselves internally, although other economists question this. An analysis of the Tennessee STAR study demonstrated that the economic benefits from higher achievement alone would be expected to yield twice the cost of reducing class size. A meta-analysis of CSR literature revealed that the benefits of smaller class size outweighed the cost in all but three of the 112 peer-reviewed studies. However, one prominent study looking at the program's effect on long-term average wage earnings of students who participated in STAR by linking the data from the experiment to IRS tax records 26 years later disagrees. One of the main findings of this study was that class size does not have a significant effect on earnings by age 27. However, the authors themselves do not consider their evidence to be conclusive and should thus be discounted. One valid finding, though, was that students who had teachers with greater education training and work experience were more likely to achieve higher earnings later in life. Additional findings were that students who were put into smaller classes were more likely to graduate high school and to, later, attend college.
