= Raymond Vernon =

American economist

Raymond Vernon (September 1, 1913 – August 26, 1999) was an American economist. He was a member of the group that developed the Marshall Plan after World War II and later played a role in the development of the International Monetary Fund and the General Agreement on Tariffs and Trade. He was the Clarence Dillon Professor of International Affairs at Harvard Kennedy School, becoming emeritus on his retirement. His formulation of the Product life-cycle theory of US exports, first published in 1966, in turn influenced the behavior of companies.

== Education ==
Vernon was born Raymond Visotsky in New York; his parents were Russian Jewish immigrants and he and his siblings changed their family name to Vernon. He earned a B.A. cum laude from the City College of New York in 1933 and a Ph.D. in economics from Columbia University in 1941; all three of his siblings also earned doctorates.

== Career ==
Vernon worked at the Securities and Exchange Commission from 1935 to 1946 and then at the US Department of State, participating in the development and implementation of the Marshall Plan and also helping facilitate the postwar recovery of Japan. He played a role in the development of the International Monetary Fund and the General Agreement on Tariffs and Trade, including negotiating the inclusion of Japan in GATT. In the early 1950s he served as acting director of the Office of Economic Defense and Trade Policy, overseeing US trade with the Soviet bloc and encouraging those countries to trade with non-Communist countries.

He then worked for two years for Mars, heading development of peanut M&M's; he was known in the candy industry as "the man who put the crunch in M & M's".

In 1956–59, he headed the New York Metropolitan Region Study for the Harvard Kennedy School, forecasting the future development of the conurbation. It was funded by the Ford Foundation and the Rockefeller Brothers Fund and was a pioneering work of urban studies.

From 1959 until his retirement, he was a faculty member at Harvard, initially at the Harvard Business School. In 1965, he headed the Multinational Enterprise Project, studying US and foreign multinational companies. From 1981 until his retirement, he was at the Kennedy School of Government, where he was an important member of the Center for Business and Government. He retired as Clarence Dillon Professor of International Affairs and held emeritus status.

Vernon was a pioneer of computerized stock-market analysis. He influenced the Harvard Business School to study real-world examples of businesses and business situations, which led in particular to Harvard researchers studying the World's Largest Enterprises. Since he had also worked as a political scientist, one focus of his research was the relationship between states and companies: he pointed to the trend for that relationship to become relatively less important and that between companies and customers more so, as business became more international in the post-war world. His work was also a basis for the movement toward privatization in the 1980s. After his death, Daniel Yergin, a friend and colleague, referred to him as "the father of globalization".

=== Product life-cycle theory ===
In 1966 Vernon published an article, "International Investment and International Trade in the Product Cycle", which he himself characterized as "the one which will appear upon my gravestone". Initially descriptive, showing how foreign direct investment by US firms—the movement to offshore production—followed as a response to consumer demand, or to a lag between product innovation and the ability to manufacture enough to satisfy demand, the theory was taken up by companies and underwent modifications in response. Vernon's analysis nonetheless held true, in particular his identification of three imperatives for success in international business: innovation, responsiveness to varying local markets, and cost.

== Private life and death ==
Vernon was an excellent rower; he competed for many years in crew in the Head of the Charles Regatta and in his 80s broke the world record in CRASH-B Sprints. He was a member of the Cambridge Boat Club for 40 years, and he and his wife, Josephine, donated a weathervane to the club. They had two daughters.

He died at his home in Cambridge, Massachusetts, of cancer.

== Honors ==
He was elected a fellow of the American Academy of Arts and Sciences in 1964.

The Association for Public Policy Analysis and Management instituted the Raymond Vernon Prize in 1984 in honor of Vernon, who was the founder editor of their journal, the Journal of Policy Analysis and Management, and renamed it the Raymond Vernon Memorial Award following his death.

== Selected publications ==
- Vernon, Raymond (1966). "International Investment and International Trade in the Product Cycle". Quarterly Journal of Economics. 80 (2): 190–207. doi:10.2307/1880689. JSTOR 1880689.
- Sovereignty at Bay: The Multinational Spread of U.S. Enterprises. Harvard Multinational Enterprise Series. New York: Basic Books. 1971. ISBN 9780465080960.
- Big Business and the State: Changing Relations in Western Europe. Cambridge, Massachusetts: Harvard University. 1974. ISBN 9780674072756.
- Storm Over the Multinationals: The Real Issues. Cambridge, Massachusetts: Harvard University Press. 1977. ISBN 9780674838758.
- Two Hungry Giants: The United States and Japan in the Quest for Oil and Ores. Cambridge, Massachusetts: Harvard University Press. 1983. ISBN 9780674914704.
- (with Spar, Debora L.) Beyond Globalism: Remaking American Foreign Economic Policy. New York: Free Press. 1989. ISBN 9780029331613.
- (with Spar, Debora L.; Tobin, Glenn) Iron Triangles and Revolving Doors: Cases in U.S. Foreign Economic Policymaking. New York: Prager. 1991. ISBN 9780275940614.

== See also ==
- Product lifecycle
