= James Wyckoff =

American economist

James Humphrey Wyckoff is a U.S.-American education economist who currently serves as Memorial Professor of Education and Public Policy (formerly the Curry Memorial Professor) at the University of Virginia, where he is also the Director of the Center for Education Policy and Workforce Competitiveness. His research on the impact of teacher compensation on teacher performance (together with Thomas Dee) has been awarded the Raymond Vernon Memorial Award of the Association for Public Policy Analysis and Management in 2015.

== Biography ==
James Wyckoff earned a B.A. in economics from Denison University in 1974 and a Ph.D. in economics from the University of North Carolina, Chapel Hill, in 1982. After his graduation, he became an assistant professor of economics at the University of Oklahoma, Norman (1982–86) before moving to the University at Albany, SUNY in 1986, where he worked as assistant professor of public administration before being promoted to associate professor and then to full professor. Intermittedly, Wyckoff also served as chair of Albany's Department of Public Administration and Policy (1996–98) and as Acting Dean of its Graduate School of Public Affairs (1998–2000). Since 2008, Wyckoff has been a professor at the University of Virginia's School of Education and Human Development and Frank Batten School of Leadership and Public Policy, where he was honored with the position of Memorial Professor of Education (formerly Curry Memorial Professor) in 2011. In 2010, he moreover became Director of EdPolicyWorks, also known as the Center on Education Policy and Workforce Competitiveness.

In terms of professional activities, Wyckoff is affiliated with the Association for Education Finance and Policy, whose president he was in 2004, and a member of the policy council of the Association for Public Policy Analysis and Management (2006–10), among else. Moreover, he sits on the editorial boards of the Journal of Policy Analysis and Management, Educational Researcher and Education Finance and Policy and has done so in the past for the Economics of Education Review.

== Research ==
James Wyckoff's research focuses on teacher labour markets, in particular on the preparation, recruitment, assessment and retention of teachers, within which he has frequently collaborated with Donald Boyd, Susanna Loeb and Hamilton Lankford. However, in the 1990s, Wyckoff has also performed research on e.g. school choice, finding (with Lankford) parents to trade-off between the relative quality of school offerings, the tuition of religious schools, the characteristics of other students in public and religious schools, and their family's socioeconomic characteristics.

Analysing the sorting of teachers by qualifications in New York with Lankford and Loeb, Wyckoff found that low-income, low-achieving and non-white students, especially in urban schools, are generally taught by the least skilled teachers, with salaries rarely leaning against and sometimes even contributing to this sorting. In further research with Boyd, they find teacher labor markets' spatial scope to be very small as teachers display strong preferences for proximity, which in turn makes it more difficult for urban schools to recruit new, well-qualified teachers. Overall, they attribute teacher sorting to a combination of more qualified teachers being more likely to leave schools with very low-performing students and schools with such students generally experiencing higher turnover than other schools, though high growth in student achievement can effectively act as a retention mechanism for effective teachers in low-achieving schools. In particular, effective teachers tend to leave low-achieving schools (but not high-achieving schools) within their second and third years at these schools, thereby likely contributing to the widening of the learning outcomes between students; by contrast, less effective teachers tend to leave both low- and high-performing schools within their first year. Importantly, they also find that the main driver behind teachers' turnover decisions in New York City is their (negative) perception of the school administration. The resulting teacher turnover evidently harms students' test scores in math and English language arts, especially in schools with many Black and low-performing students.

However, narrowing the gap between the qualifications of teachers in high- and low-performing schools is possible; for example, the NYC Teaching Fellows and Teach for America initiatives were able to substantially reduce such a gap between New York City's low- and high-poverty schools over 2000–2005 by substituting uncertified teachers in high-poverty schools by academically qualified teachers. Further research by Wyckoff and his co-authors on teachers' preparation and recruitment has found that teachers with reduced pre-job coursework often provide smaller initial gains in both math and English language arts when compared to teachers who completed a university-based teacher education program, though most differences disappear as the cohort matures and that teacher preparation programs' vary in their impact on teachers' value added to student test score performance, with practice-based preparation being particularly effective for new teachers. However, in the past, Wyckoff has been cautious to call for specific policies regarding teacher certification and preparation, arguing that the verdict on their impact on teacher quality and student achievement was still out. Moreover, teachers who have the highest value-added to student test performance have distinctly different instructional practice profiles, e.g. consistently scoring better on Explicit Strategy Instruction. Finally, together with Thomas Dee, Wyckoff has also evaluated IMPACT, the high-powered teacher-evaluation system introduced by Michelle Rhee in Washington D.C., and found that dismissal threats increased the voluntary attrition of low-performing teachers and improved the performance of remaining teachers, while financial incentives were effective in further improving the performance of high-performing teachers.
