= Thomas Kane (economist) =

American education economist (born 1961)

Thomas Joseph Kane
- Born: September 5, 1961 (age 64)
- Occupation: American education economist

Thomas Joseph Kane (born September 5, 1961) is an American education economist who currently holds the position of Walter H. Gale Professor of Education and Economics at the Harvard Graduate School of Education. He has performed research on education policy, labour economics and econometrics. During Bill Clinton's first term as U.S. President, Kane served on the Council of Economic Advisers.

== Early life and education ==
Kane earned a B.A. in economics from the University of Notre Dame in 1983, followed by an M.A. in economics from the University of Michigan in 1986, a M.P.P. and Ph.D. from Harvard University in 1988 and 1991. His doctoral thesis was on the determinants of Afro-Americans' entry to college during the 1970s and 1980s.

== Career ==
After graduating, Kane became an assistant professor of public policy at Harvard Kennedy School at Harvard University, where he was promoted to associate professor in 1997. While at Harvard, Kane also began working as a research associate at the National Bureau of Economic Research, with which he still maintains an affiliation, held appointment as visiting fellow at Brookings Institution and as national fellow at the Hoover Institution, and worked as senior economist for labour, education, and welfare on the Council of Economic Advisers under Bill Clinton (1995–96).

In 2001, Kane became the Professor of Policy Studies and Economics at the University of California, Los Angeles, though he returned to an appointment as Professor of Education and Economics at the Harvard Graduate School of Education and as faculty director of the Harvard Center for Education Policy Research in 2005, where he has worked ever since. From 2008 to 2012, Kane was the deputy director of the U.S. education branch of the Bill and Melinda Gates Foundation. In 2013, the Harvard Graduate School of Education honoured him with the position of Walter H. Gale Professor of Education.

== Research ==
Kane has conducted extensive research on education in the United States, ranging from K-12 education to higher education and covering topics such as the effectiveness of charter schools, teacher education and certification, education policy, affirmative action, and education finance. Throughout much of his research, Kane has cooperated with Douglas Staiger (Dartmouth College).

=== Collegiate enrollment ===
Since his Ph.D., Kane has researched the determinants of enrollment into college in the U.S. and the impact of family background on it. Examining Afro-Americans' college enrollment rate in the U.S. during the 1980s, Kane attributes its 1980-84 decline to the growth of direct college costs and their 1984-87 rebound to the strong growth in the average parental education of Afro-American youth. Analysing the impact of affirmative action admitting the use of racial preferences in college admissions, Kane observes that the use of such action seems to be limited to the most selective fifth of colleges and that the net relationship between college selectivity, earnings and college graduation rates is positive for minority and other students, going on to argue that colleges' student bodies wouldn't be as racially diverse without affirmative action. Importantly, Kane and David T. Ellwood find that the college enrollment rates of youth displaying similar levels of academic preparation for college still vary considerably depending on their parents' income and education, with the gaps having widened in the 1980s and 1990s due to the growth in the returns to college education. Finally, together with Christopher Avery, Kane has investigated the impact of Boston's College Opportunity and Career Help (COACH) programme, a programme that has Harvard University students help public high school students make career plans and submit college and financial aid applications, and found that (i) high school students tend to overestimate both the tuition rates and rates of return to college education independent of their socioeconomic background, (ii) that the complexity of the financial aid and college application processes often discourages low-income students even if they are qualified and interested in a college education, (iii) and that many public high school students reporting an interest in college education either don't believe they are qualified and/or never wanted to pursue college education anyway.

=== School accountability ===
Another substantial body of Kane's research addresses the topics of school accountability, school choice and quality, and the effectiveness of charter schools. With regard to school accountability, Kane and Staiger have been critical of test-based school accountability systems, arguing that the imprecision and volatility of school test scores (e.g. due to sampling variation or sample size-invariant idiosyncrasies) often used as a basis for such systems may weaken or pervert incentives. Instead, they advocate for extending rewards and bonuses even to schools without extremely high scores to effectively incentivize large schools, not making them contingent on improvements in each racial group to avoid disadvantages for integrated schools, to use improvements across both years and outcomes as a basis, and to account for the impact of test score volatility and the choice of baseline year. Moreover, they note that, even in states with strong financial incentives, the marginal reward to schools for raising student performance is dwarfed by the expected increase in students' labour market value due to such improvements.

In research with Justine Hastings, Kane and Staiger study the determinants of families' school choices and the effectiveness of public school choice plans, finding that parents prefer close by schools and their valuation of high-performing schools increases in their own academic ability, though such preferences also display strong idiosyncrasies. Moreover, they find that public school choice plans plans are likely to yield a one-sided increase in parental demands for better school quality at already high-performing schools. In further investigation, Kane, Staiger and Hastings observe that — if offered public school choice plans - parents from ethnic minorities trade off high-performing schools against schools wherein their minority is highly represented, whereas parents with high socioeconomic status tend to focus on school performance alone; this results in lower demand for better school quality at schools that serve mostly minority families or families with low socioeconomic status, implying that public school choice plans may exacerbate educational inequality. Moreover, in research with David Deming, Kane, Staiger and Hastings find that college attainment among lottery participants assigned to their first-choice public school increases due to these schools being generally of higher quality, though the gains in college attainment are strongly concentrated among girls since these tend to take better advantage of the improved learning environment (e.g. via preparatory courses for college).

With regard to the effectiveness of charter schools, Kane, Angrist, Dynarski, Pathak, and Christopher Walters find that attending a KIPP charter school increases the average achievement of students by 0.36 standard deviations in math and 0.12 standard deviations in reading per year spent in such a school, with most of the gains accruing to students with special needs and limited English proficiency. In further research with Atila Abdulkadiroglu, they also find that being assigned by lottery to a Boston charter school strongly and significantly raises middle and high school students' test scores, whereas being assigned to a pilot school sometimes decreases test scores. Finally, Kane has also studied the relationship between school quality and housing prices: together with Staiger and Stephanie Riegg, he finds evidence that school boundaries systematically affect housing prices, though the impact is prone to overestimation and partly mediated by demographic characteristics and improvements in housing that are independent from school boundaries.

=== Teacher effectiveness ===
The effectiveness of teachers constitutes a third area of Kane's research. Criticizing the lack of improvement in U.S.-American teachers' effectiveness, Kane, Staiger and Robert J. Gordon suggest to (i) reduce entry barriers to teaching, (ii) increase barriers to tenure, (iii) award bonuses to highly effective teachers willing to teach at disadvantaged schools, (iv) measure teachers' job performance, and (v) track student performance and teacher effectiveness over time. Comparing different methods to estimate teachers' impacts on student achievement, Kane and Staiger argue for the impact to be estimated most accurately if both prior student test scores and mean classroom characteristics are considered; they find that teacher-specific effects fade by about half each year after teachers' initial assignment to a class. Moreover, in further work with Jonah Rockoff, Kane and Staiger find that - unlike teachers' performance in classrooms during the first two years - teacher certification poorly predicts teachers' future effectiveness. Together with Brian Jacob, Kane, Staiger and Rockoff also observe that composite measures of teachers' cognitive and non-cognitive skills predict well teachers' effectiveness, though individual measures do not. Finally, in joint work with John Tyler, Eric Taylor and Amy Wooten, Kane finds classroom-based measures of teaching effectiveness to be good predictors of student achievement (though some teaching practices predict achievement more than others), leading him to suggest that teacher evaluations should use both classroom observations and student test scores.

Kane has published extensively on the measurement of teacher effectiveness as part of his involvement in the Bill and Melinda Gates Foundation's Measuring Effective Teaching (MET) project. In particular, Kane and Staiger found that (i) measures of teaching effectiveness such as FFT, CLASS, PLATO, MQI, and UTOP are positively correlated with student achievement gains; (ii) the reliable assessment of teacher's practices necessitates the averaging of scores over multiple observations, (iii) the combination of observation scores with evidence of student achievement gains and student feedback is more predictive and reliable; (iv) unlike teaching experience and graduate degrees, the combined measure identifies teachers with larger gains on the state tests; and (v) teachers performing strongly on the combined measure also performed well in terms of their students' in-class effort, enjoyment and gains in terms of math comprehension and literacy. Later research by Kane and his MET co-researchers Staiger, Daniel McCaffrey and Trey Miller confirmed that the measures of effective teaching assessed within the MET project successfully identified teachers who produced on average higher gains in student achievement, with the differences being roughly as large as what would have been predicted based on their effectiveness as measured in 2009–10. The implications of the findings of the MET project for the design of teacher evaluation systems are summarized in Kane's 2015 book Designing Teacher Evaluation Systems (with Kerri Kerr and Robert Pianta as co-authors).

=== Returns on post-secondary education ===
A fourth area of Kane's research regards the returns to and financing of postsecondary education. For example, he and Cecilia Rouse find that the labour market returns to 2- and 4-year college credits are similarly large - ca. 5% per year of college - and not due to signalling., and that U.S. community colleges have played a key role in providing access to higher education to older, part-time or less well-prepared students, substantially raising aggregate educational attainment and even non-graduates' earnings, even for non-graduates. Furthermore, together with Staiger, they also draw attention to misestimations in OLS and IV estimates in the returns to schooling due to systematic misreporting of educational attainment by survey respondents if such attainment doesn't correspond to a degree.

With respect to the financing of postsecondary education, Kane finds that especially low-income youth are very sensitive to the price of college education, but also that means-tested grant programmes haven't been more effective in increasing the college enrollment of that target group than general tuition subsidies. Relatedly, in his evaluation of the Cal Grant (a means-tested financial aid for college), Kane finds that grant eligibility increases the college enrollment of financial aid applicants by 3-4 percentage points, especially for private Californian 4-year colleges. Similarly, in his evaluation of the impact of the D.C. Tuition Assistance Program, which has subsidized the tuition of D.C. residents attending public higher education institutions in nearby states since 2000, Kane finds that the programme has increased the number of Pell grant recipients and college freshmen from D.C. by at least 15%, especially within the Afro-American community. Many of these themes are taken up by Kane's 1999 book The Price of Admission, wherein he criticizes the growing dependence of college enrollment on family income and the sometimes perverse interactions of state and federal policies for financial aid, and suggests a number of reforms to improve the effectiveness of public subsidies for college, such as limiting the eligibility of Pell grants to college freshmen and sophomores and providing a larger share of public college tuition subsidies based on students' post-college resources rather than parents' pre-college income and assets. Finally, together with Peter Orszag and David Gunter, Kane finds that higher education spending has been increasingly crowded out by other items of state budgets since the late 1970s, in particular Medicaid, with countercyclical reductions in higher education spending typically becoming permanent in the absence of procyclical increases.

=== Other topics ===
In their research on abortion in the U.S., Kane and Staiger find that restricting the access to abortion, including through abortion clinic closures or restrictions on Medicaid funding for them lowered teenage birth rates during the 1980s due to decreases in in-wedlock births (out-of-wedlock births were unaffected). Moreover, Kane, Staiger, Phillip Levine and David Zimmerman find that the fertility rates in those states legalizing abortion decreased by 4% (11% if interstate abortions are taken into account), with most of the impact accruing to reduced births among teenage, middle-aged, non-White and/or unmarried women, thus suggesting that a reversal of Roe v. Wade might raise birth rates but be strongly undermined by abortions being legally performed out of state.

Studying the potential of the German vocational training system for the U.S., Kane (together with Dietmar Harhoff) has argued that the conditions that U.S. employers would be less willing to invest into vocational training than in Germany, leading him to doubt that the introduction of the German apprenticeship system would increase the earnings of comparable American youth and improve the school-to-work transitions of in particular minority youth.

== Selected publications ==
- Kane, T.J. (1999). The Price of Admission: Rethinking how Americans Pay for College. Washington, D.C.: Brookings Institution.
