= Thomas Dee =

American economist

Thomas S. Dee
- Occupation: American economist
- Website: https://dee.stanford.edu

Thomas S. Dee is an American economist and the Barnett Family Professor of Education at Stanford University, where he also directs the John W. Gardner Center for Youth and Their Communities.

== Biography ==
Thomas Dee earned a B.A. in economics with a focus on public policy from Swarthmore College in 1990, followed by an M.A. and a PhD in economics from the University of Maryland in 1994 and 1997. After his graduation, Dee worked as an assistant professor of economics at the Georgia Institute of Technology (1997–99) and later also at Swarthmore College (1999–2005). There, he was promoted in 2005 to the position of associate professor and given the direction of the college's public policy programme. In 2010, Dee moved to the University of Virginia as research professor of education and professor of public policy and economics (2010–12), before further moving to Stanford University as professor of education in 2012. From 2015 to 2018, Dee directed the Stanford Center for Education Policy Analysis (CEPA) and served as Associate Dean for Faculty Affairs at the Stanford Graduate School of Education. Additionally, Dee is affiliated with a number of institutions, including the National Bureau of Economic Research (NBER), the Stanford Institute for Economic Policy Research (SIEPR), CESifo, the Danish National Center for Social Research, the American Enterprise Institute, and the China Center for Human Capital and Labor Market Research at Central University of Finance and Economics. Furthermore, he has been affiliated with the Association for Education Finance and Policy and the Institute of Education Sciences. In terms of editorial duties, Dee sits on the editorial boards of the Journal of Policy Analysis and Management and Educational Researcher and has sat on the board of Educational Evaluation and Policy Analysis in the past.

== Research ==
Thomas Dee's current research interests mostly revolve around education, including the economics of education, the analysis and implementation of educational policy, school finance, school reform, and high-stakes testing. Earlier research has also focused on youth health, e.g. teenage traffic accidents and youth health behaviors such as smoking and drinking. According to IDEAS/RePEc, Thomas Dee belongs to the top 5% of economists as ranked by their research.

=== Research on education ===
Throughout his academic career, Dee has studied many topics related to education and education policy, e.g. competition between private and public schools, returns to education, and teacher incentives. Analysing the relationship between public school quality and the effect of competition from private schools, Dee finds that competition from the latter has a significant positive impact on the graduation rates of neighbouring public high schools. Investigating the existence of returns to education in the form of civic engagement and attitudes, Dee argues that educational attainment strongly increases voter participation, support for freedom of speech and newspaper readership (a measure of civic knowledge). With regard to the effectiveness of teacher incentives, Dee finds mixed evidence. In his evaluation of Tennessee's Career Ladder Evaluation System, which rewarded teachers who increased student achievement, together with Benjamin J. Keys, he finds that the test scores in mathematics of students assigned to career-ladder teachers were 3 percentile points higher than otherwise, but that such an assignment had no significant impact on reading scores. By contrast, his evaluation of IMPACT, the high-powered teacher-evaluation system introduced by Michelle Rhee in Washington D.C., conducted with James Wyckoff finds that dismissal threats increased the voluntary attrition of low-performing teachers and improved the performance of remaining teachers, while financial incentives were effective in further improving the performance of high-performing teachers. Additionally, Dee has pioneered research on the impact of demographic similarity between students and teachers as well as on the impact of No Child Left Behind, the flagship education programme of George W. Bush's administration.

==== The impact of demographic similarity between teachers and students ====
Analysing the impact on students' school achievement of being taught by a teacher of the same ethnic group in Tennessee, Dee finds that assignment of students to a teacher of their own ethnicity significantly increased both black and white students' achievements in mathematics and reading. Vice versa, Dee has also studied how demographic similarity between students and teachers influences teachers' subjective evaluations of student behavior and performance and found students' racial, ethnic and gender characteristics to substantially colour teachers' perceptions of student performance. However, the former two effects mainly appear in conjunction with students coming from poor family backgrounds or living in the South, which provides a strong argument for the recruitment of teachers from underrepresented minorities. This research is complemented by Dee's study of the impact of being taught by a teacher of the same gender, which he finds to significantly improve the achievements of both male and female students as well as teachers' perceptions of student performance and engagement.

==== The impact of No Child Left Behind ====
Together with Brian Jacob, Thomas Dee has extensively researched the impact of the No Child Left Behind Act (NCLB) - and its emphasis on test-based school accountability - on students, teachers, and schools. In particular, Dee and Jacob find that NCLB improved the math achievements of younger students, especially from disadvantaged backgrounds, but failed to do so with regard to reading, raised school district expenditure, in particular on teacher compensation, and improved the quality of teachers, and resulted in a shift of teaching time towards math and reading as tested subjects.

=== Research on youth health and youth behavior ===
The other main area besides education on which Dee has conducted research is youth health, e.g. teenage smoking and drinking, sexual activity, and traffic accidents. Analysing how teen drinking and youth traffic fatalities respond to beer taxes, Dee finds that - while results vary substantially between U.S. states - beer taxes are generally ineffective in reducing teen drinking and associated traffic fatalities. In another study on teen drinking, Dee finds teen drinking and smoking to be complementary behaviors, with the increase in minimum legal drinking ages (MLDA) from 18 to 21 having reduced the numbers of teen smokers by 3-5% and higher cigarette taxes having lowered the prevalence of teen drinking. However, while teens facing a lower MLDA were substantially more likely to drink, the raise in the MLDA had no significant effect on educational attainment. Further research on the impact of macroeconomic conditions on alcohol abuse by Dee finds binge drinking to be strongly countercyclical, even among those who remain employed during the crisis. Finally, Dee, David Grabowski and Michael Morrisey investigated the impact of the introduction of graduated driver licensing (GDL) on teen traffic fatalities and find that GDL regulations reduced fatalities among 15- to 17-year-olds by at least 5.6% over 1992–2002 and didn't increase fatality risks for older teens once they didn't face GDL restrictions anymore.
