= Sean Reardon =

American sociologist

Sean F. Reardon
- Occupation: American sociologist
- Website: https://cepa.stanford.edu/sean-reardon

Sean F. Reardon is an American sociologist who currently serves as the Endowed Professor of Poverty and Inequality in Education at the Stanford Graduate School of Education, where he also is a member of the Steering Committee of the Center for Education Policy Analysis (CEPA). Reardon is an Elected Fellow to the American Academy of Arts & Sciences.

== Biography ==
Sean Reardon earned a B.A. in liberal arts from the University of Notre Dame in 1986, after which he taught for four years at Red Cloud Indian School (South Dakota) and Moorestown Friends School (New Jersey) before returning to Notre Dame and obtaining a M.A. in peace studies in 1991. After his M.A., Reardon pursued his education at the Harvard Graduate School of Education, from which he obtained an M.Ed. and an Ed.D. in educational administration, planning and social from in 1992 and 1997. Following his graduation, Reardon first briefly worked as a postdoctoral researcher at Harvard's Children Initiative on the evaluation of programmes for children (1998–99) and then became an assistant professor of education and sociology at Pennsylvania State University, before moving to Stanford University in 2004. At Stanford, Reardon was promoted from associate professor to full professor in 2012 and has been the Endowed Professor of Poverty and Inequality in Education since 2014. Additionally, he serves at Stanford as Director of the Stanford Interdisciplinary Doctoral Training Program in Quantitative Education Policy Analysis and as a senior fellow of the Stanford Institute for Economic Policy Research. Reardon was elected to the National Academy of Education in 2014 and sits on the Board of Directors of the Society for Research on Educational Effectiveness. Reardon performs or has performed editorial duties for many academic reviews in education, including Sociology of Education, Educational Evaluation and Policy Analysis, Journal of Economic Inequality, American Educational Research Journal, Journal of Research on Educational Effectiveness, and Educational Researcher.

His research has been awarded the Palmer O. Johnson Memorial Award by the American Educational Research Association in 2013 as well as the William T. Grant Foundation's Scholar Award in 2007 for research on the transition from adolescence to adulthood in Chicago neighbourhoods.

== Research ==
Sean Reardon's research focuses on the economics and sociology of education, educational policy, and educational inequality. In particular, Reardon has conducted extensive research on segregation in the United States, e.g. between ethnic groups, socioeconomic groups, and in terms of school locations. For example, together with Gary Orfield, Sara Schley and Diane Glass, Reardon observes that Afro-American and Hispanic students are much more likely than White students to find themselves in schools of concentrated poverty. He further finds that segregation between non-Hispanic white students and all other students has increased, on average, while segregation among black, Hispanic and Asian student groups has decreased, with the overall change being mostly attributable to growth in between-district segregation as segregation within districts has decreased. Studying the trajectory of racial school segregation in the wake of Brown vs. Board of Education, Reardon finds that segregation gradually increased following release from court order, relative to the trends in segregation in districts remaining under court order, with the increases being more pronounced in the South, in elementary grades, and in districts where prereleease school segregation levels were low; this suggests that court-ordered desegregation plans are effective in reducing racial school segregation but see their effects fade over time without continued court oversight. Methodologically, Reardon (with Glenn Firebaugh) has argued that information theory indices are better measures of multigroup segregation than indices of dissimilarity, Gini, squared coefficient of variation, relative diversity or normalized exposure, as they alone accord with the principle of transfers and can be decomposed into inter- and intra-group effects.

Another major topic in Reardon's research concerns spatial segregation between ethnic and socioeconomic groups. In terms of methodology, Reardon and O'Sullivan have argued that spatial information theory indices - i.e. measures of the variation in the diversity of the local spatial environments of each individual - and spatial exposure/isolation indices - i.e. measures of the average composition of individuals' local spatial environments - are better measures of spatial segregation than indices of spatial relative diversity and spatial dissimilarity. Moreover, Reardon's research on spatial segregation has repeatedly emphasized the issue of geographic scale, i.e. while some groups are segregated over regions, other groups are mainly segregated across neighbourhoods or even within neighbourhoods. With regard to racial segregation in the United States, Reardon, Barnett Lee and others find that segregation between Blacks and Whites is mainly due to segregation between metropolitan districts rather than to segregation within neighbourhoods, though the latter is the main driver of Hispanic-White and Asian-White segregation. Concerning segregation by income groups, Reardon and Kendra Bischoff observe that - especially for Afro-American families - income inequality increases income segregation, as inequality spurs the large-scale segregation of rich people rather than it segregates poor people or affects small-scale patterns of income segregation.

Finally, Reardon has also studied educational inequality in the United States. For example, he finds (with Galindo) that Hispanic children in general and Mexican and Central American children in particular enter kindergarten with an - on average - much lower reading and math aptitude than their non-Hispanic white children, though the gaps in both subjects narrow by about a third within the two first years of elementary school but remain stable afterwards. Moreover, in research on the historical trajectory of educational inequality, Reardon finds that the gap between the educational achievements of children from families in the 10th richest percentile of the income distribution and those from the 10th poorest percentile increased by 30-40% between 1976 and 2001, is now twice as large as the black-white achievement gap, is already large when children enter kindergarten, is driven mainly by a closer correlation between family income and children's academic achievement in families with incomes over the median and not by growing income inequality or a stronger influence of parents' education.
