= Dynarski =

Dynarski is a surname. Notable people with the surname include:

- Eugene Dynarski (1933–2020), American actor
- Susan Dynarski, American professor of public policy, education, and economics
