= Kirabo Jackson =

American economist

Bo Jackson
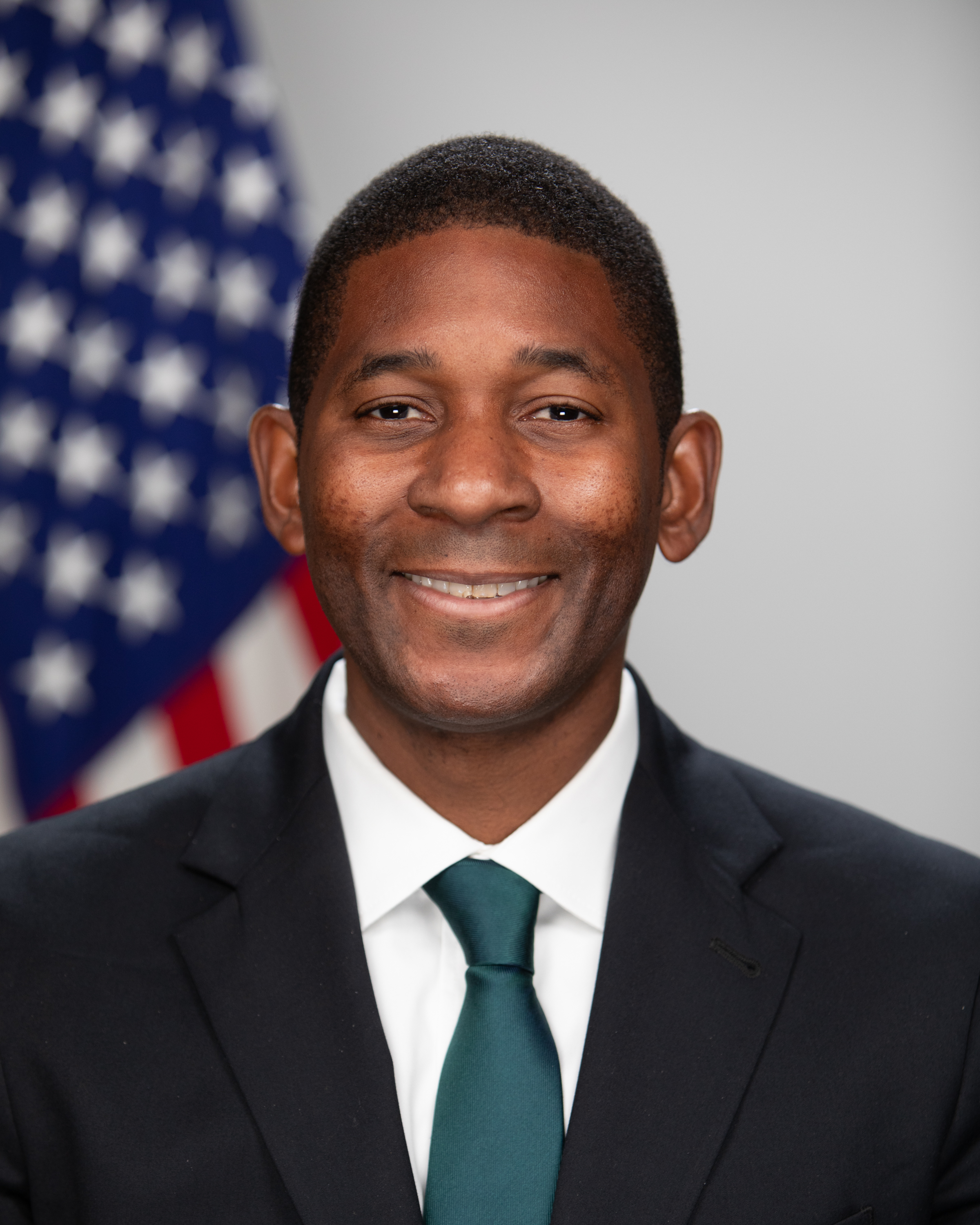
- Born: 1980 (age 45–46); Hinsdale, Illinois, U.S.

Academic background
- Education: Yale University (BA); Harvard University (MA, PhD)
- Doctoral advisor: Caroline Hoxby; Lawrence Katz

Academic work
- Discipline: Education economics Labor economics Public finance
- Institutions: Northwestern University; Cornell University
- Awards: David N. Kershaw Award (2020); American Academy of Arts and Sciences (2023)

C. Kirabo "Bo" Jackson is an American economist who is Abraham Harris Professor of Education and Social Policy and Professor of Economics at Northwestern University, a Fellow at the Institute for Policy Research, and a Faculty Research Fellow at the National Bureau of Economic Research. He previously served as co-editor at Journal of Human Resources and is currently on leave as Editor in Chief of the American Economic Journal: Economic Policy. In 2020, he was elected to the National Academy of Education and was awarded the David N. Kershaw Award and Prize for contributions to the field of public policy analysis and management from the Association for Public Policy Analysis and Management (APPAM). In 2022 he was elected to the American Academy of Arts and Sciences which honors the excellence and leadership of exceptional people from all disciplines and practices. In August, 2023, Jackson joined President Biden's three-member Council of Economic Advisers.

== Education and early life ==
Jackson is the son of an economist, and was born in 1980 in Hinsdale, Illinois. He grew up in the United States, the Caribbean, Tanzania, and Sierra Leone before earning a bachelor's degree in ethics, politics, and economics from Yale University in 2002 and a PhD in economics from Harvard University in 2007.

Jackson's Jamaican father, Clement, was the first director of the Planning Institute of Jamaica. His mother June Jackson, a native of Trinidad & Tobago, was a lecturer at the University of Technology.

== Career ==
Jackson began his teaching career as assistant professor in the School of Industrial and Labor Relations at Cornell University before moving to Northwestern in 2010. He was awarded tenure at Northwestern University in 2012.

His research has focused on teacher labor markets and determinants of student success beyond test scores. In a series of papers, he showed that court-ordered increases in school funding in the 1970s increased later-life outcomes, such as wages in adulthood, for the students affected.

=== Selected works ===
- Jackson, C. Kirabo, and Elias Bruegmann. "Teaching students and teaching each other: The importance of peer learning for teachers." American Economic Journal: Applied Economics 1, no. 4 (2009): 85-108.
- Jackson, C. Kirabo, Rucker C. Johnson, and Claudia Persico. "The effects of school spending on educational and economic outcomes: Evidence from school finance reforms." The Quarterly Journal of Economics 131, no. 1 (2016): 157–218.
- Jackson, C. Kirabo. "Student demographics, teacher sorting, and teacher quality: Evidence from the end of school desegregation." Journal of Labor Economics 27, no. 2 (2009): 213–256.
- Jackson, C. Kirabo. "Match quality, worker productivity, and worker mobility: Direct evidence from teachers." Review of Economics and Statistics 95, no. 4 (2013): 1096–1116.
- Jackson, C. Kirabo. "A little now for a lot later a look at a Texas advanced placement incentive program." Journal of Human Resources 45, no. 3 (2010): 591–639.
- EPI’s Annual Lecture 2019 delivered by Professor Kirabo Jackson – ‘Education for Long-Run Success’
