= Susan Dynarski =

American economist

Susan Marie Dynarski
- Born: Chelsea, Massachusetts, U.S.
- Education: Harvard University (BA, MPP); Massachusetts Institute of Technology (PhD)
- Spouse: Robert (Bob) Brustman (1993–2017; his death)
- Children: 2
- Scientific career
- Fields: Economics
- Workplaces: Harvard University; University of Michigan
- Doctoral advisors: Joshua Angrist; Jonathan Gruber
- Website: http://www.susandynarski.com/

Susan Marie Dynarski is an American economist who is currently professor of education at the Harvard Graduate School of Education. She is also a faculty research associate of the National Bureau of Economic Research.

== Early life and education ==
Dynarski earned a Bachelor of Arts degree in social studies from Harvard University; neither of her parents graduated from college. She then worked as a union organizer for six years, engaged in successful certification campaigns for clerical and technical employees at Harvard University and the University of Minnesota, before returning to Harvard for a Master of Public Policy degree and then earning a Ph.D. in economics from the Massachusetts Institute of Technology.

== Career ==
Dynarski began her academic career as an assistant and associate professor at the Kennedy School at Harvard University. She has been a visiting fellow at the Federal Reserve Bank of Boston and a visiting faculty member at Princeton University. From 2008 to 2021, she was a professor of public policy, education and economics at the University of Michigan, where she was a University Professor of Diversity and Social Transformation and co-director of the university's Education Policy Initiative.

=== Research ===
Dynarski's research focuses on the impact of financial aid on college students and their families, improving the design of such programs to achieve the greatest benefit to students (particularly those from low-income families) at the lowest cost to taxpayers, the effectiveness of charter schools, and the impact of price on private school attendance decisions.

She has held editorial positions at American Economic Journal: Economic Policy, Educational Evaluation and Policy Analysis, The Journal of Labor Economics and Education Finance and Policy. She has been a board member of the Association for Public Policy Analysis and Management, and is past president of the Association for Education Finance and Policy and Midwest Economics Association.

She has been awarded the "Public Service Matters" award from the Network of Schools of Public Policy, Affairs, and Administration (NASPAA) for her work on college affordability and student debt, the Robert P. Huff Golden Quill Award from the National Association of Student Financial Aid Administrators for her research on student aid, and the Spencer Foundation Award for her research on education policy. In 2020 she was awarded a Carnegie Fellowship.

In 2013 she and co-authors Joshua Hyman and Diane Schanzenbach were awarded the Raymond Vernon Memorial Award for the best article in the Journal of Policy Analysis and Management.

==== Selected works ====
- Susan Dynarski, Katherine Michelmore, CJ Libassi, and Stephanie Owen (2018). "Closing the Gap: The Effect of a Targeted, Tuition-Free Promise on College Choices of High-Achieving, Low-Income Students". NBER Working Paper 25349.
- Dynarski, Susan (2003). "Does aid matter? Measuring the effect of student aid on college attendance and completion". American Economic Review. 93 (1): 279–288. doi:10.1257/000282803321455287.
- Dynarski, Susan (2000). "Hope for whom? Financial aid for the middle class and its impact on college attendance". National Tax Journal. 53 (3): 629–661. doi:10.17310/ntj.2000.3S.02. S2CID 232214625. Archived from the original on 2014-09-17.
- Atila Abdulkadiroglu; Joshua D. Angrist; Susan M Dynarski; Thomas J Kane; Parag A Pathak (2011). "Accountability and flexibility in public schools: Evidence from Boston's charters and pilots" (PDF). The Quarterly Journal of Economics. 126 (2): 699–748. doi:10.1093/qje/qjr017. hdl:10.1093/qje/qjr017.
- Dynarski, S. (2002). The behavioral and distributional implications of aid for college. American Economic Review, 92(2), pp. 279–285.
- Dynarski, S. et al. (1997). Can families smooth variable earnings? Brookings Papers on Economic Activity, 1997(1), pp. 229–303.
- Angrist, J.D. et al. (2012). Who benefits from KIPP? Journal of Policy Analysis and Management, 31(4), pp. 837–860.
- Deming, D., Dynarski, S. (2008). The lengthening of childhood. Journal of Economic Perspectives, 22(3), pp. 71–92.
- Angrist, J.D. et al. (2016). Inputs and impacts in charter schools: KIPP Lynn. American Economic Review, 100(2), pp. 239–243.
- Angrist, J.D. et al. (2013). Stand and deliver: Effects of Boston's charter high schools on college preparation, entry, and choice. Journal of Labor Economics, 34(2), pp. 275–318.

=== Public impact ===
Dynarski has testified before the US Senate Finance Committee, the United States Senate Committee on Health, Education, Labor and Pensions, the House Ways and Means Committee, the United States House Committee on Education and Labor, and the President's Advisory Panel for Federal Tax Reform. She advocates for simplifying the FAFSA (Free Application for Federal Student Aid) to help more low-income students in the United States attend college. She has advised the Federal Reserve Bank of New York, the Federal Reserve Board of Governors, the Consumer Financial Protection Bureau, the White House, the United States Department of the Treasury, the United States Department of Education, and the Council of Economic Advisers on potential student aid reforms. She is a contributing columnist for The New York Times. The Chronicle of Higher Education named her one of the "top ten influencers and agitators of 2015," calling her "The Sensible Explainer."

Senator Lamar Alexander cited her research in his advocacy to simplify the FAFSA, which was signed into law as part of the December 2020 U.S. Budget Act.
