= Michelle Reininger =

Michelle Reininger is an assistant professor at Stanford University and currently serves as the executive director of the Center for Education Policy Analysis (CEPA).

== Biography ==
Michelle Reininger earned a Bachelor of Arts in biochemistry from the University of Colorado Boulder in 1996, followed by a Master of Arts in leadership, foundations and policy from the School of Education and Human Development (formerly the Curry School of Education) at the University of Virginia in 2001, a Master of Arts in economics from Stanford University in 2004, and a Ph.D. in social sciences, policy and educational practice from Stanford Graduate School of Education in 2006. After her Ph.D., Reininger became an assistant professor of human development and social policy and learning sciences at Northwestern University and a faculty fellow at the Institute for Policy Research, Northwestern University, with which she maintains an affiliation. She subsequently returned to Stanford to become the executive director of Stanford's Center for Education Policy Analysis, wherein she is also involved CEPA's School Leadership Research.

Her research work has focused mostly on the dynamics of the labor markets of teachers and principals, including their training, recruitment and retention.
