= Rucker Johnson =

American economist

Rucker C. Johnson

Academic background
- Education: University of Michigan MA, 1997; PhD 2002; Morehouse College BA, 1995

Academic work
- Discipline: Labor Economics; Education Economics
- Institutions: Goldman School of Public Policy
- Website: https://gspp.berkeley.edu/faculty-and-impact/faculty/rucker-johnson

Rucker C. Johnson is an American economist currently serving as Chancellor’s Professor of Public Policy in the Goldman School of Public Policy at the University of California, Berkeley. He is also a faculty research associate at the National Bureau of Economic Research and the W.E. B. Du Bois Institute of Harvard College as well as a Research Affiliate of the National Poverty Center and the Institute for Poverty Research. He is an elected member of the American Academy of Arts and Sciences and the National Academy of Education, and was elected as a Fellow of the American Academy of Political and Social Science. He won the 2017 Andrew Carnegie Fellowship and also the 2022 University of Louisville Grawemeyer Award in Education (a $100,000 prize) for his 2019 book “Children of the Dream: Why School Integration Works,” written with Alexander Nazaryan.

== Education and early life ==
Johnson is one of three children of Carol R. Johnson, former superintendent of schools in Boston, Memphis, and Minneapolis, and history teacher Matthew Johnson. He attended Morehouse College, graduating in 1995, and completed his MA and PhD degrees in economics at the University of Michigan in 2002.

== Research ==
Johnson's research focuses on disparities in education and economic outcomes—both the causes and the consequences of these disparities. In his book, "Children of the Dream: Why School Integration Works," he argues that integration improved the academic and life outcomes of black students—especially because it affected the same students who benefitted from the early years of the Head Start Program—but meaningful school integration in the United States lasted for only 10–15 years in the 1970s and 1980s. In work with Kirabo Jackson and Claudia Persico, he found that court-ordered increases in school resources affected school graduation rates, college-completion rates, and adult earnings for the affected children. He has also studied the costs and benefits of incarceration, finding that as incarceration rates increased to high levels, the impact on crime reduction fell.

=== Selected works ===
- Johnson, Rucker C. Children of the dream: Why school integration works. Hachette UK, 2019.
- Jackson, C. Kirabo, Rucker C. Johnson, and Claudia Persico. "The Effects of School Spending on Educational and Economic Outcomes: Evidence from School Finance Reforms." The Quarterly Journal of Economics 131, no. 1 (2016): 157-218.
- Johnson, Rucker C., and Robert F. Schoeni. "The influence of early-life events on human capital, health status, and labor market outcomes over the life course." The BE journal of economic analysis & policy 11, no. 3 (2011).
- Johnson, Rucker C., and C. Kirabo Jackson. "Reducing inequality through dynamic complementarity: Evidence from Head Start and public school spending." American Economic Journal: Economic Policy 11, no. 4 (2019): 310-49.
- Johnson, Rucker, and Steven Raphael. "How much crime reduction does the marginal prisoner buy?." The Journal of Law and Economics 55, no. 2 (2012): 275-310.
- Johnson, Rucker C., and Mary E. Corcoran. "The road to economic self‐sufficiency: Job quality and job transition patterns after welfare reform." Journal of Policy Analysis and Management 22, no. 4 (2003): 615-639.
- Johnson, Rucker C., and Robert F. Schoeni. "Early-life origins of adult disease: national longitudinal population-based study of the United States." American journal of public health 101, no. 12 (2011): 2317-2324.
- Johnson, Rucker C., Ariel Kalil, and Rachel E. Dunifon. "Employment patterns of less-skilled workers: Links to children’s behavior and academic progress." Demography 49, no. 2 (2012): 747-772.
