= Susanna Loeb =

American economist

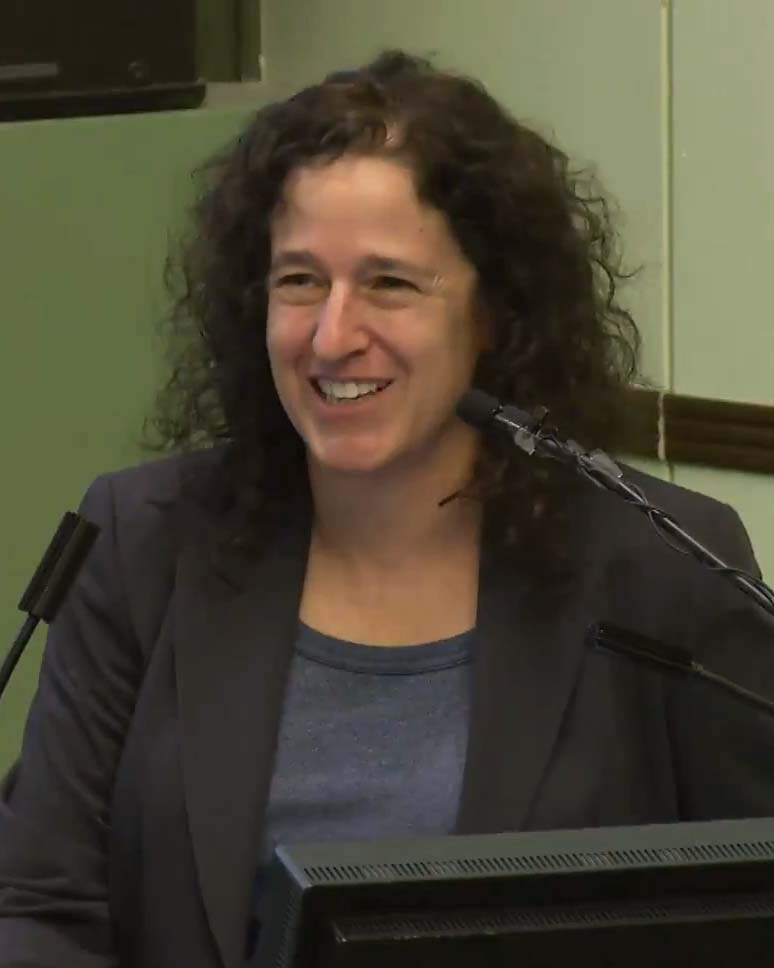

Academic background
- Education: Stanford University; University of Michigan
- Doctoral advisor: Paul Courant

Academic work
- Discipline: Educational economics
- Institutions: Stanford University; Brown University; Annenberg Institute at Brown University
- Notable ideas: Educational policy Policy analysis
- Awards: American Academy of Arts and Sciences

Susanna Loeb is an American education economist, a professor and faculty director of the SCALE Initiative at the Stanford Graduate School of Education. She is also the Founder and Executive Director of the National Student Support Accelerator, which aims to expand access to high-impact tutoring to address inequities in educational opportunities. Prior to returning to Stanford in 2023, she led the Annenberg Institute at Brown University. Before moving to Brown University, she was the Barnett Family Professor of Education at the Stanford Graduate School of Education, where she also served as founding director of the Center for Education Policy Analysis (CEPA). Moreover, she directs Policy Analysis for California Education (PACE). Her research interests include the economics of education and the relationship between schools and educational policies, in particular school finance and teacher labor markets.

In 2020, Loeb was elected to the American Academy of Arts and Sciences.

== Biography ==
Susanna Loeb earned a B.S. in civil engineering and a B.A. in political science from Stanford University in 1988, followed by an M.P.P. in public policy and a Ph.D. in economics from the University of Michigan in 1994 and 1998. Since, 2005, Loeb has been the director of Policy Analysis for California Education (PACE), a non-partisan research center dedicated to research on California's education system. From 2006 to 2009, Loeb directed the Institute for Research on Education Policy and Practice (IREPP), which subsequently became the Center for Education Policy Analysis and as director of which she also served until 2015. Moreover, since 2009, she has been a senior fellow at the Stanford Institute for Economic Policy Research. Additionally, Loeb maintains affiliations with the National Bureau of Economic Research (NBER) and the National Board for Education Sciences. Finally, she currently performs editorial duties for the Economics of Education Review, Educational Evaluation and Policy Analysis, and Education Finance and Policy. On July 1, 2018, she became the director of the Annenberg Institute at Brown University.

In 2007, Loeb's research on teacher education was awarded the Distinguished Research in Teacher Education Award by the Association of Teacher Educators.

== Research ==
=== Research on teacher labour markets ===
One major area of Susanna Loeb's research concerns the labour markets of teachers, which she has explored notably with Donald Boyd, James Wyckoff, Hamilton Lankford, and Pamela Grossman. Analysing the sorting of teachers by qualifications in New York with Lankford and Wyckoff, Loeb found that low-income, low-achieving and non-white students, especially in urban schools, are generally taught by the least skilled teachers, with salaries rarely leaning against and sometimes even contributing to this sorting. In further research with Boyd, they find teacher labour markets' spatial scope to be very small as teachers display strong preferences for proximity, which in turn makes it more difficult for urban schools to recruit new, well-qualified teachers. Overall, they attribute teacher sorting to a combination of more qualified teachers being more likely to leave schools with very low-performing students and schools with such students generally experiencing higher turnover than other schools, though high growth in student achievement can effectively act as a retention mechanism for effective teachers in low-achieving schools. In particular, effective teachers tend to leave low-achieving schools (but not high-achieving schools) within their second and third years at these schools, thereby likely contributing to the widening of the learning outcomes between students; by contrast, less effective teachers tend to leave both low- and high-performing schools within their first year. Studying why exactly teachers at low-performing schools in California are more likely to request transfers, Loeb and her co-authors find low teacher salaries and bad working conditions in schools (e.g. large class sizes, facilities problems, multitrack schools, and lack of textbooks) to be the main reasons besides negative interactions with students, though similar research in New York City by Loeb instead finds that teachers' (negative) perceptions of the school administrations are the main driver behind transfers. The resulting teacher turnover evidently harms students' test scores in math and English language arts, especially in schools with many Black and low-performing students.

However, narrowing the gap between the qualifications of teachers in high- and low-performing schools is possible; for example, the NYC Teaching Fellows and Teach for America initiatives were able to substantially reduce such a gap between New York City's low- and high-poverty schools over 2000–2005 by substituting uncertified teachers in high-poverty schools by academically qualified teachers. Further research by Loeb and her co-authors on teachers' preparation and recruitment has found that teachers with reduced pre-job coursework often provide smaller initial gains in both math and English language arts when compared to teachers who completed a university-based teacher education programme, though most differences disappear as the cohort matures. Another article suggested that New York City teacher preparation programmes' vary in their impact on teachers' value added to student test score performance, though a later reanalysis found no differences between programs except for one small outlier.

A 2013 study by Loeb and her colleagues teachers who have the highest value added to student test performance have distinctly different instructional practice profiles, e.g. consistently scoring better on Explicit Strategy Instruction. Finally, in research with Marianne Page, Loeb finds that - contrary to earlier estimates - raising teacher wages by 10% reduces high school dropout rates by 3-4% once the true opportunity costs of being a teacher - e.g. alternative wage opportunities and non-pecuniary job attributes - are taken into account.

=== Research on principals ===
A second and more recent area of Loeb's research studies the role of principals with regard to school and student success. In research with Eileen Horng and Daniel Klasik, Loeb finds that the time used by school principals on organization management activities improves school and student outcomes, whereas day-to-day instruction activities tend to have no effect on student performance and deteriorate teachers' and parents' school assessments. More specifically, she finds in a study with Jason Grissom and Benjamin Master, that if principals use their instructional time to coach teachers, evaluate performance and develop their schools' educational programmes, their instructional time tends to predict student achievement gains, whereas time spent on informal classroom walkthroughs has the opposite effect. Moreover, only principals' organization management skills are found to consistently predict student achievement growth and other measures of school success. In other research with Demetra Kalogrides and Tara Béteille, Loeb observes that principal turnover generally decreases school performance by reducing teacher retention and depressing student achievement gains, with the effect being particularly pronounced in high-poverty or low-achieving schools as well as in schools with inexperienced teachers. Furthermore, principals with less experience as well as with less and lower-quality education tend to sort to schools serving many low-income, non-White, and low-achieving students, as high-quality principals tend to transfer away faster from such schools. Taking the perspective of schools, Loeb, Kalogrides and Béteille find that more effective schools succeed in attracting and hiring more effective teachers from other schools, assign inexperienced teachers more equitably over grades, and are better at retaining high-quality teachers.

=== Research on Head Start, school size, preschool childcare, and school accountability ===
Two topics that Loeb has researched with Valerie Lee are the fading effects of the Head Start Programme and the impact of school sizes. With regard to Head Start, they find that former attendees of Head Start tend to be educated in comparatively low-quality middle grade schools, which structurally undermined the long-term effects of participation in Head Start and partly explains why only little benefits were observed. Regarding the impact of school size, they observe that the attitudes of teachers regarding their responsibility for student learning benefit tend to be higher in smaller schools and - through this pathway - increase elementary school students' annual gains in mathematics achievement scores.

In research with Martin Carnoy, Loeb finds that students in high-accountability states averaged significantly higher gains on the NAEP 8th-grade math tests compared to students in state with little or no external accountability, though there is no significant effect on student retention or high school completion rates. Loeb extensively reviews the literature on school accountability in her corresponding article with David Figlio in the Handbook of the Economics of Education.

Finally, together with an eclectic range of co-authors, Loeb has analysed the effect of different types of childcare on children's development. In particular, Loeb finds that childcare in preschool centers raises reading and math scores but negatively affects socio-behavioural measures (except for English-proficient Hispanic children), with the duration of childcare, the age at which children start attending preschool centers (optimally at age 2–3), and the intensity of childcare all playing important roles regarding the overall effect. Moreover, center-based childcare programmes are found to increase the cognitive growth of children from poor families, especially if caregivers are more sensitive and responsive, improve their social development if caregivers are highly educated, and reduce behavioural problems compared to children in poor communities who receive family childcare.
