= Student–teacher ratio =

Number of students divided by number of teachers

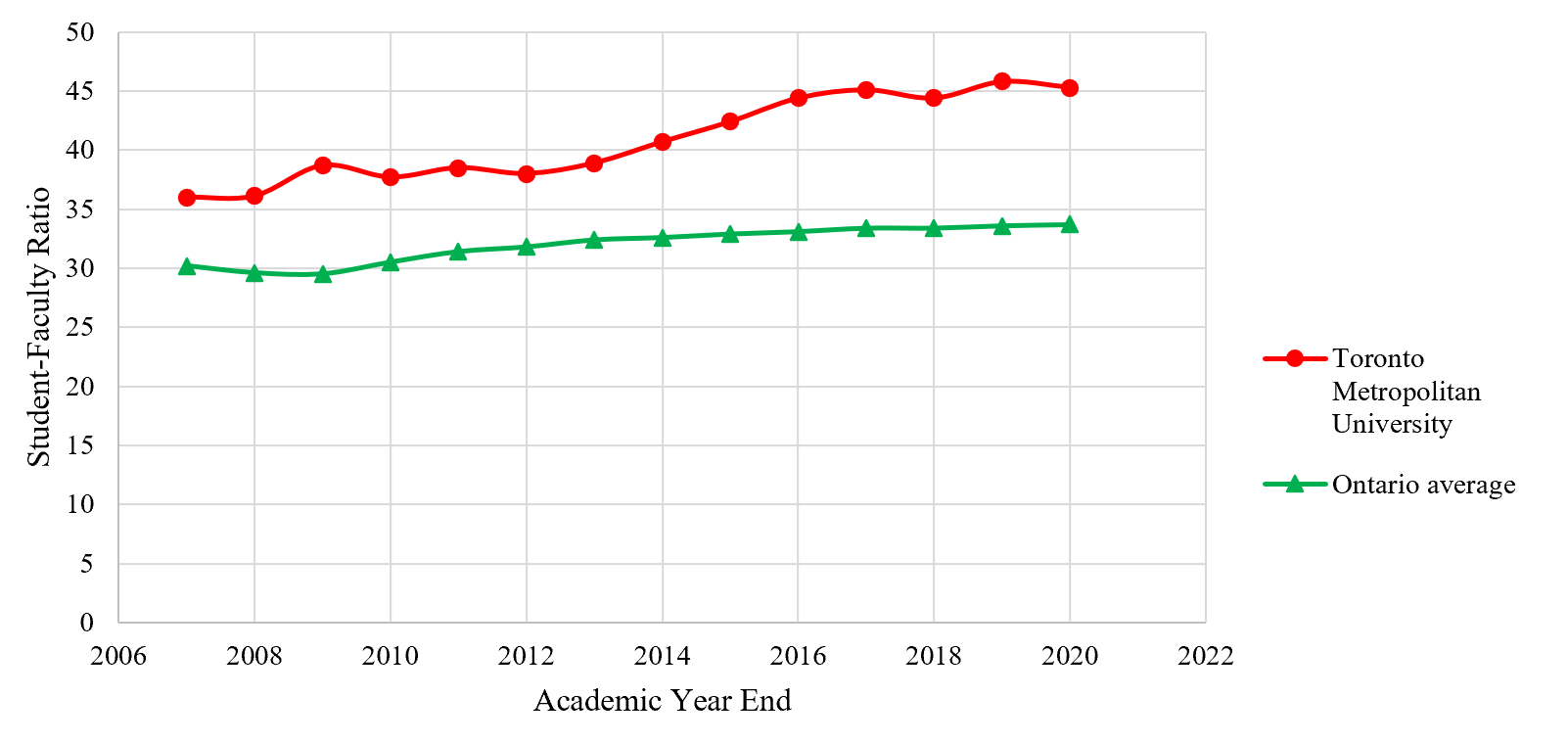
Student-faculty ratio at Toronto Metropolitan University compared to the average of Ontario between 2006 and 2022

The student–teacher ratio or student–faculty ratio refers to the number of students for every teacher in a school. For example, a student–teacher ratio of 10:1 indicates that there are 10 students for every one teacher. The term can also be reversed to create a teacher–student ratio.

A related measure is the staff:child ratio, the number of children for whom each child care staff member (or family child care provider) is responsible for supervising.

The ratio is often used as a proxy for class size, although various factors can lead to class size varying independently of student–teacher ratio (and vice versa). In most cases, the student–teacher ratio will be significantly lower than the average class size.

Student–teacher ratios vary widely among developed countries. In primary education, the average student–teacher ratio among members of the Organisation for Economic Co-operation and Development (OECD) is just below 16, but ranges from 40 in Brazil to 28 in Mexico to 11 in Hungary and Luxembourg.

== Relationship to class size ==
Factors that can affect the relationship between student–teacher ratio and class size include the number of teachers with non-teaching duties, the number of classes per teacher, and the number of teachers per class. In addition, if there are small classes for a small number of students, for example for special education or second language learners, the student–teacher ratio for the institution as a whole will be misleadingly low relative to the average student's experience.

An example of this variation is that both Israel and the United States have an average student–faculty ratio of 15, but the average class size is 21 in the United States but 27 in Israel.

== Background ==
A low student–teacher ratio is often used as a selling point to those choosing schools for tertiary education. On the other hand, high student–teacher ratio is often cited for criticizing proportionately underfunded schools or school systems, or as evidence of the need for legislative change or more funding for education.

In the United States, some states have enacted legislation mandating a maximum student–teacher ratio for specific grade levels, particularly kindergarten. Student–teacher ratios are averages (means) and do not necessarily correspond to the number of students in a particular class, and thus are vulnerable to skewing. For example, figures may be biased as follows: if one classroom has a 30:1 ratio and another has a 10:1 ratio, the school could thus claim to have a 20:1 ratio overall. In schools, such ratios are indicative of possible staff changes. If the student–teacher ratio is 50:1, the school will probably consider hiring more teachers. If the ratio is very low, classes could be combined and teachers fired. In extreme cases, the school may close due to its apparent redundancy.

Smaller classes may allow teachers to spend less time dealing with disruptions associated with classroom overcrowding and more time providing individual attention to students. Also, too many students in a class results in a diverse field of students, with varying degrees of learning ability. Consequently, the class will spend time for less academic students to assimilate the information, when that time could be better spent progressing through the curriculum. In this way, student–teacher ratios are compelling arguments for advanced or honors classes.

== Effects on student performance ==
Numerous sources argue that lower student–teacher ratios are better at teaching students complex subjects, such as physics, mathematics and chemistry, than those with a higher ratio of students to teachers. Commonly, the schools with lower student–teacher ratios are more exclusive, have a larger number of white students and are in non-inner urban areas and/or fee-paying (non-government) institutions.

The manifold arguments and controversies of funding and student–teacher ratios have been the basis for a multitude of studies and debates. One view is illustrated below:

Many analysts have found that extra school resources play a negligible role in improving student achievement while children are in school. Yet many economists have gathered data showing that students who attend well-endowed schools grow up to enjoy better job market success than children whose education takes place in schools where resources are limited. For example, children who attend schools with a lower pupil–teacher ratio and a better educated teaching staff appear to earn higher wages as adults than children who attend poorer schools.

Smaller classes are widely believed to benefit all pupils because of individual attention from teachers, and low-attaining pupils are seen to benefit more at the secondary school level, where the content level is more challenging. Pupils in large classes drift off task because of too much instruction from the teacher to the whole class instead of individual attention, and low-attaining students are most affected. Students benefit in later grades from being in small classes during early grades. Longer periods in small classes resulted in more increases in achievement in later grades for all students. In reading and science, low achievers benefit more from being in small classes. The benefits of small class sizes reduce the student achievement gap in reading and science in later grades. In contrast, in East Asian countries like Japan, larger class sizes are valued for the opportunities they give children to rub shoulders and socialize in the group, especially at the lower levels, and particularly preschool.

== See also ==
- Class size reduction

== Works cited ==
- OECD (2014). Education at a Glance: OECD Economic Indicators. OECD. ISBN 978-92-64-21505-4.
