= Product life-cycle theory =

Theory to describe international trade patterns

The Product Life Cycle Theory is an economic theory that was developed by Raymond Vernon in response to the failure of the Heckscher–Ohlin model to explain the observed pattern of international trade. The theory suggests that early in a product's life-cycle all the parts and labor associated with that product come from the area where it was invented. After the product becomes adopted and used in the world markets, production gradually moves away from the point of origin. In some situations, the product becomes an item that is imported by its original country of invention. A commonly used example of this is the invention, growth and production of the personal computer with respect to the United States.

The model applies to labor-saving and capital-using products that (at least at first) cater to high-income groups.

In the new product stage, the product is produced and consumed in the US; no export trade occurs. In the maturing product stage, mass-production techniques are developed and foreign demand (in developed countries) expands; the US now exports the product to other developed countries. In the standardized product stage, production moves to developing countries, which then export the product to developed countries.

The model demonstrates dynamic comparative advantage. The country that has the comparative advantage in the production of the product changes from the innovating (developed) country to the developing countries.This model is developed in 1960 and largely accepted by US and other developed countries.

== Product life-cycle ==
Raymond Vernon divided products into three categories based on their stage in the product life cycle and how they behave in the international trade market:

- New Product
- Maturing Product
- Standardized Product

There are five stages in a product's life cycle in respect to the Product Life Cycle Theory:

- Introduction
- Growth
- Maturity
- Saturation
- Abandonment

The location of production depends on the stage of the cycle.

According to International Product Life Cycle theory there are five phases which describe how a product matures and declines as a result of internationalization:

- Local Innovation
- Overseas Innovation
- Maturity
- World Wide Imitation
- Reversal

=== Stage 1: Introduction ===
This is where the new product is introduced to the market, the customers are unaware about the product. To create demand, producers promote the new product to stimulate sales. At this stage, profits are low but starts increasing and there are few competitors. As more units of the product sell, it enters the next stage automatically.

For example, a new product invented in the United States for local consumers is first produced in the United States because that is where the demand is, and producers want to stay close to the market to detect consumer response. Characteristics of the product and the production process are in a state of change during this stage as firms familiarize themselves with the product and the market. No international trade takes place.

=== Stage 2: Growth ===
In this stage, demand for the product increases sales. As a result, production costs decrease and profits are high. The product becomes widely known and competitors enter the market with their own version of the product. To attract as many consumers as possible, the company that developed the original product increases promotional spending. When many potential new customers have bought the product, it enters the next stage

=== Stage 3: Maturity ===
In the maturity stage of the Product life cycle, the product is widely known and many consumers own it. In the maturity phase of the product life cycle, demand levels off and sales volume increases at a slower rate. There are several competitors by this stage and the original supplier may reduce prices to maintain market share and support sales. Profit margins decrease, but the business remains attractive because volume is high and costs, such as for development and promotion, are also lower. In addition, foreign demand for the product grows, but it is associated particularly with other developed countries, since the product is catering to high-income demands. For instance, in the case of the newly invented product, this rise in foreign demand (assisted by economies of scale) leads to a trade pattern whereby the United States exports the product to other high-income countries. Other developments also occur in the maturing product stage. Once the American firm is selling to other high-income countries, it may begin to assess the possibilities of producing abroad in addition to producing in the United States. With a plant in France, for example, not only France but other European countries can be supplied from the French facility rather than from the U.S. plant. Thus, an initial export surge by the United States is followed by a fall in U.S. exports and a likely fall in U.S. production of the goods.

=== Stage 4: Saturation ===
It is a stage in which there is neither increase nor decrease in the volume of sale. Through modification in the attribute of the product is needed to attract new consumers. Competitors product at this stage would have started gaining its market share

=== Stage 5: Decline ===
By this time in the product’s life cycle, the characteristics of the product itself and of the production process are well known; the product is familiar to consumers and the production process to producers. This occurs when the product peaks in the maturity stage and then begins a downward slide in sales. Eventually, revenues drop to the point where it is no longer economically feasible to continue making the product. Investment is minimized. The product can simply be discontinued, or it can be sold to another company. Production may shift to the developing countries. Labor costs again play an important role, and the developed countries are busy introducing other products. For instance, the trade pattern shows that the United States and other developed countries have now started importing the product from the developing countries.

On costs and revenues: Low production costs and a high demand ensures a longer product life. When production costs are high and demand is low, it is not offered on the market for a long time and, eventually, is withdrawn from the market in the 'decline' stage.

Note that a particular firm or industry (in a country) stays in a market by adapting what they make and sell, i.e., by riding the waves.
