= David N. Kershaw Award =

Award for scholars in the social sciences

The David N. Kershaw Award and Prize recognizes young professionals under the age of 40 who have made distinguished contributions to the field of public policy analysis and management. The award, which includes a cash prize, goes to early-career professionals whose contributions to research-based knowledge have advanced the design, implementation, and evaluation of public policies.

== Winners ==
List of Kershaw Award winners
Year	Recipient	Institution
2024	Katherine Michelmore	University of Michigan
2023	Elizabeth Linos	Harvard University
2022	Abigail Aiken	University of Texas at Austin
2021	Sanya Carley	Indiana University
2020	Kirabo Jackson	Northwestern University
2018	David Deming	Harvard University
2016	Varun Rai	University of Texas at Austin
2014	Donald Moynihan	University of Wisconsin-Madison
2012	John M. MacDonald	University of Pennsylvania
2011	Esther Duflo	Massachusetts Institute of Technology
2008	Brian Jacob	University of Michigan
2006	Jens Ludwig	Georgetown University
2005	Carolyn Heinrich	University of Wisconsin-Madison
2003	David Cutler	Harvard University
2001	James Hamilton	Duke University
1999	Jonathan Caulkins	Carnegie Mellon University
1997	Alan Krueger	Princeton University
1995	John DiIulio	Princeton University
1993	Rebecca Blank	Northwestern University
1991	Katherine Swartz	Urban Institute
1991	Deborah Freund	Indiana University
1987	David Ellwood	Harvard University
1985	Lee Friedman	University of California at Berkeley
1983	Joseph Newhouse	Rand Corporation
