= Julie Berry Cullen =

American economist and academic

- Education: Massachusetts Institute of Technology; Stanford University
- Scientific career
- Workplaces: University of California, San Diego; University of Michigan; Northwestern University
- Thesis: Essays on special education finance and intergovernmental relations (1997)

Julie Berry Cullen is an American economist who is a professor and Chair of Economics at the University of California, San Diego. She is also a researcher at the National Bureau of Economic Research. Her research considers public economics and the economics of education.

== Early life and education ==
Cullen was an undergraduate student at Stanford University, where she majored in economics and English. She moved to Massachusetts Institute of Technology as a doctoral researcher, where she studied special education finance. After earning her doctorate, she was awarded a Robert Wood Johnson Foundation Health Policy Fellowship. She investigated the relationship between crime rates and people leaving cities, showing that each additional reported crime was associated with a one-person decline in population.

== Research and career ==
In 1997, Cullen joined the University of Michigan as an assistant professor of economics. In Michigan, she studied the Disability insurance (DI) program and the welfare implications of increasing benefit generosity. She spent six years in Michigan before moving to the University of California, San Diego. Cullen was made associate professor in 2006 and professor in 2013. She was promoted to chair of the department in 2021. She holds a research fellowship with the National Bureau of Economic Research.

Cullen is an expert in public economics and the economics of education. She has studied strategies to improve struggling high schools, and showed that expanding access to education that provides work experiences and life skills is a cost-effective way to benefit people on low incomes. She has investigated the relationships between political alliances and tax evasion. She proposed that when people do not believe the government shares their values, they are more willing to rationalize cheating and misreport their taxable income. Cullen showed that when people move out of political alliances they are less likely to comply with tax laws. In that sense, evading tax is more like resisting tax.

Cullen investigated whether sorting students by ability improves learning or increases disparities, and found that it does not harm low-achieving students but benefits high-achieving students. She hypothesized that this was because low-achieving students benefited from smaller class sizes, while high-achieving students benefited from more advanced peers. Her research has shown that the United States is not training enough young people with skills in mathematics, particularly young people from disadvantaged communities.

== Awards and honors ==
- 2014 UCSD Faculty Teaching Award
- 2016 UCSD Faculty Teaching Award
- 2018 UCSD Distinguished Service Award

== Selected publications ==
- Julie Berry Cullen; Steven D. Levitt (September 1996). "Crime, Urban Flight, and the Consequences for Cities" (PDF). National Bureau of Economic Research Working Paper Series. National Bureau of Economic Research Working Paper Series (5737). National Bureau of Economic Research. doi:10.3386/w5737. ISSN 0898-2937. Wikidata Q105890954.
- Julie Berry Cullen; Brian Jacob; Steven Levitt (September 2000). "The Impact of School Choice on Student Outcomes: An Analysis of the Chicago Public Schools" (PDF). National Bureau of Economic Research Working Paper Series. National Bureau of Economic Research Working Paper Series (7888). National Bureau of Economic Research. doi:10.3386/w7888. ISSN 0898-2937. Wikidata Q105851862.
- Julie Berry Cullen; Randall Reback (June 2006). "Tinkering Toward Accolades: School Gaming Under a Performance Accountability System" (PDF). National Bureau of Economic Research Working Paper Series. National Bureau of Economic Research Working Paper Series (12286). National Bureau of Economic Research. doi:10.3386/w12286. ISSN 0898-2937. Wikidata Q105881120.
