= Annenberg Institute at Brown University =

Research institute at Brown University

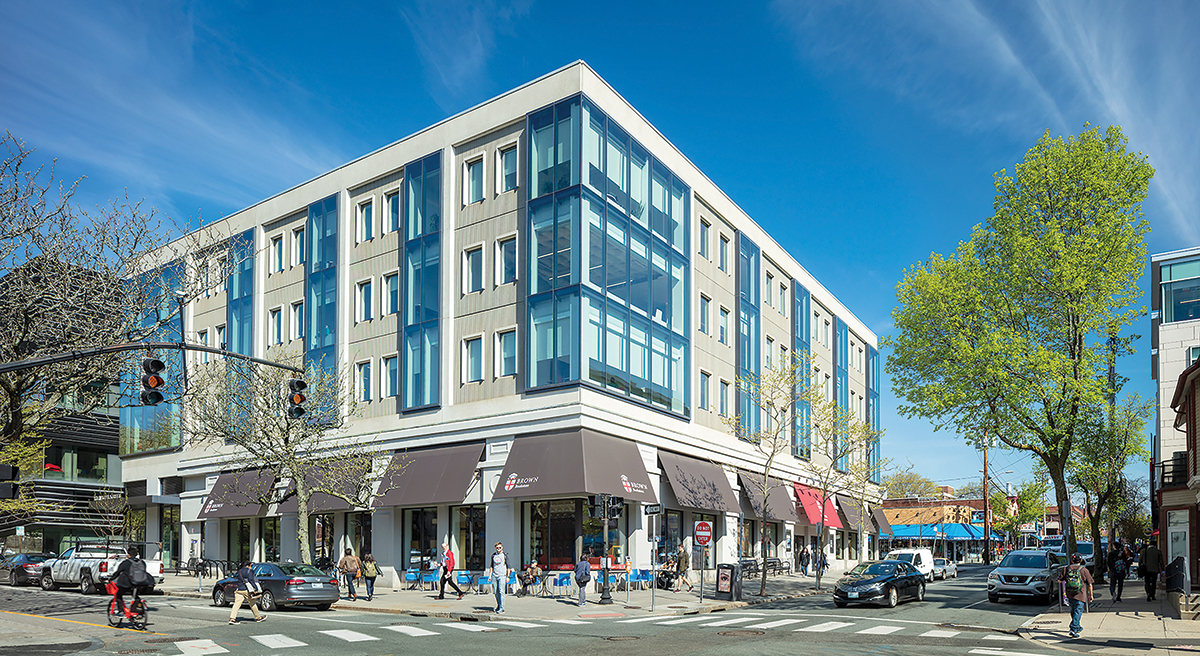
- The Annenberg Institute offices located at 164 Angell Street.
- Parent institution: Brown University
- Founder: Theodore R. Sizer
- Established: 1993; 33 years ago
- Director: John Papay
- Address: 164 Angell St.
- Location: Providence, Rhode Island
- Coordinates: 41.8282°N 71.401°W
- Interactive map of Annenberg Institute at Brown University
- Website: annenberg.brown.edu

The Annenberg Institute at Brown University is an education research and reform institute at Brown University. Its work focuses on understanding and addressing educational inequality through research, policy analysis, and partnerships with practitioners and policymakers. The Institute's mission is to "understand the causes and consequences of educational inequality and to reduce this inequality through innovative, multidimensional, and research-informed approaches."

The Institute was established in October 1993 as the National Institute for School Reform and was renamed the Annenberg Institute for School Reform in December 1993 following a gift from the Annenberg Foundation. In 2024, the organization adopted the shortened name “Annenberg Institute."

Prominent educational reformer Theodore R. Sizer founded the Institute and served as its inaugural director. Since 2023, the Institute has been directed by John Papay.

== History ==
The National Institute for School Reform was established in October 1993 following a $5 million gift from an anonymous donor. A subsequent $50 million gift, part of Ambassador Walter H. Annenberg's $500 million Challenge to the Nation to improve public education in America, enables the organization to expand the scope of its work and renamed the Annenberg Institute for School Reform.

The Annenberg Institute’s founder and first director was education reform leader Theodore R. Sizer. Sizer was previously the founder and chairman of the innovative Coalition of Essential Schools, which envisioned a type of whole-school reform, with differentiated learning and a commitment to educating informed citizens. Under Sizer, the Institute builds upon the work of the Coalition and expands its goals, endeavoring to support sustained, focused efforts to enhance the quality of learning of children and youth across the country. Sizer directed the Institute from its founding in 1993 to 1996.

In October 1998, Warren Simmons leaves his position as director of the Philadelphia Education Fund to become director of the Institute. Under Simmons’ leadership, the Institute adopts a mission statement concentrating on the critical need to improve schools in the nation’s urban communities. In December 2015, Simmons stepped down as executive director of the Annenberg Institute and transitioned to serve as senior fellow and faculty in Brown University’s Urban Education Policy master’s program.

The University conducted a review of the Institute in 2017. Following the review, the University moved to shift the Institute's focus away from school reform and community-based work to focus primarily on research on educational inequality. In adjusting the Institute's focus, provost Richard M. Locke sought to better integrate the institute's work with University research and academic departments.

In 2018, Susanna Loeb, previously the Barnett Family Professor of Education at Stanford University and founding director of the Center for Education Policy at Stanford, assumes leadership of the Institute in July. Reflecting the University's strategic plan Building on Distinction, Loeb emphasized closer integration with the University’s research and teaching mission, and aimed to create a hub of scholarship and policy work that engages faculty, students, and practitioner experts. This work addressed the causes, consequences, and mitigation of educational inequality with the goal of creating scalable solutions.

After Loeb's departure in 2023, education scholar John Papay was named director of the Institute. He continues to position the Annenberg Institute to serve as a hub of education scholarship that confronts some of the most pressing issues in teaching and learning, including opportunity gaps and learning loss during the COVID-19 pandemic. By creating a broader set of opportunities for engagement and learning for students, postdoctoral fellows, researchers, scholars, and practitioners across campus and beyond, Papay expands the Institute's robust set of collaborative research projects, generating insights that can be directly applied to teaching practices and education policy.

== People ==
Former Directors

- Theodore R. Sizer, Director (1993–1996)
- Ramón Cortines, Interim Director (1996–1998)
- Warren Simmons, Director (1998–2015)
- Michael Grady, Interim Director (2015–2018)
- Susanna Loeb, Director (2018–2023)
- John Papay, Director (2023–Present)

Fellows

- Howard Fuller, Senior Fellow (1995–97)
- Deborah Meier, Senior Fellow (1995–1997)

Faculty

- Beth Boulay, Distinguished Senior Research Scientist
- Jesse Bruhn, Annenberg Assistant Professor of Education and Assistant Professor of Economics
- Christopher Cleveland, Assistant Professor of Education and Education Policy
- John Diamond, Ford Foundation Professor of Sociology and Education Policy
- Margot Jackson, Professor of Sociology
- Susan Moffitt, Professor of Political Science and International and Public Affairs
- Lindsay C. Page, Annenberg Associate Professor of Education Policy
- Derron O. Wallace, Associate Professor of Education Policy and Africana Studies
