= Martin Carnoy =

Martin Carnoy (born 1938) is an American labour economist and Vida Jacks Professor of Education at the Stanford Graduate School of Education. He is an elected member of the National Academy of Education as well as of the International Academy of Education. Professor Carnoy has graduated nearly 100 PhD students, a record at Stanford University.

== Early life and education ==
Martin Carnoy was born to Jewish parents in Warsaw, Poland in 1938. The family escaped from Poland and emigrated to the United States when Martin was 18 months old, following the invasion by Nazi Germany in September 1939.

Carnoy received his B.A. in electrical engineering from the California Institute of Technology (1960) and a M.A. and Ph.D. in economics from the University of Chicago (1961 and 1964.)

== Career ==
Carnoy is the Vida Jacks Professor of Education at Stanford University School of Education. Prior to coming to Stanford, he was a Research Associate in Economics, Foreign Policy Division, at the Brookings Institution. Carnoy is affiliated with the Economic Policy Institute (EPI), Center for Education Policy Analysis (CEPA), and is a member of the American Educational Research Association's Grants Board Committee. He is also an elected member of the National Academy of Education and the International Academy of Education.

Carnoy has worked as a consultant to the World Bank, Inter-American Development Bank, Asian Development Bank, UNESCO, International Energy Agency, OECD, UNICEF, International Labour Office.

== Research ==
Carnoy is a labor economist with a special interest in the relation between the economy and the educational system. To this end, he studies the US labor market, including the role in that relation of race, ethnicity, and gender, the US educational system, and systems in many other countries. He uses comparative analysis to understand international comparative education, the economics of education and applied econometrics, with a focus on the political economy of education.

Through his research, Carnoy has argued that educational policy is used by capitalist nations' "bourgeois elites" as a form of cultural imperialism in order to perpetuate the conditions allowing for the exploitation of working classes both within and without these nations through e.g. education systems that support inherited advantages (Education as Cultural Imperialism, 1974). He has chronicled how Marxist views on the role of the state shifted considerably throughout the 20th century, sometimes bearing little loyalty to the original views of Karl Marx (The State and Political Theory, 1984).

Dr. Carnoy has also written on education. He has explored how Cuba leverages small, personalized schools, highly trained teachers, strong principals, a coherent curriculum and long-term relationships between teachers and students to academically outperform most other Latin American countries (Cuba's Academic Advantage, 2007). Together with Luis Beneviste and Richard Rothstein, Carnoy has weighed in on the debate between private and public education, arguing that many private schools in inner cities face the same problems as their neighboring public schools and thus questioning the extent to which they can be part of the solution. Similarly, Carnoy, Rothstein, Lawrence Mishel and Rebecca Jacobsen have contributed to the debate on charter schools through their book The Charter School Dust-Up, wherein they compare student enrollment and achievement in charter and public schools and explain the finding that students in the latter tend on average to academically outperform students in the former.

Carnoy has conducted research on the impact of school accountability on learning, the effectiveness and efficiency of private schools, the impact of globalization on education systems, school vouchers, flexible work, and the impact of structural adjustment on education. Key findings of Carnoy's research include:

- Students in U.S. states with high school accountability averaged significantly higher gains on the National Assessment of Educational Progress 8th-grade math tests compared to students in states with little or no school accountability, though there is no significant effect on student retention or high school completion rates (with Susanna Loeb).
- In Chile, Catholic private schools are more effective with regard to education provision than public schools and non-religious private schools, whereas the relationship is reversed with regard to efficiency (with Patrick J. McEwan).
- The effectiveness of the implementation of school voucher systems, e.g. in Sweden and Chile, in terms of improving learning outcomes depends critically on the socioeconomic characteristics of their beneficiaries; importantly, its impact on public education is mediated through the expectations and regard a society has for public education (e.g. high in Sweden and low in Chile).

== Published works ==
- Carnoy, Martin (2014). Education and Social Transition in the Third World, Princeton: Princeton University Press.
- Carnoy, Martin, Loyalka, Prashant, Dobryakova, Maria, Dossani, Rafiq, Froumin, Isak, Kuhns, Katherine, Tilak, Jandhyala, Wang, Rong (2013). University Expansion in a Changing Global Economy: Triumph of the BRICs? Palo Alto: Stanford University Press.
- Carnoy, Martin, Chilisa, Bagel, Chisholm, Linda (2012). The Low Achievement Trap: Comparing Schooling in Botswana and South Africa, HSRC Press
- Carnoy, Martin (2009). Faded Dreams: The Politics and Economics of Race in America. Cambridge University Press.
- Carnoy, Martin (2007). Cuba's Academic Advantage: Why Students in Cuba Do Better in School, Palo Alto: Stanford University Press.
- Carnoy, Martin, Witte, John (2007). Vouchers and Public School Performance: A Case Study of the Milwaukee Parental Choice Program, Economic Policy Institute.
- Carnoy, Martin, Jacobsen, Rebecca, Mishel, Lawrence, Rothstein, Richard (2005). The Charter School Dust-Up, Washington, DC: Economic Policy Institute.
- Carnoy, Martin (2004). Sustaining the New Economy: Flexible Families, Work, and the State in the Information Age, Cambridge University Press
- Carnoy, Martin, Brown, Michael, Currie, Elliott (2003). Whitewashing Race: The Myth of a Color-Blind Society, University of California Press.
- Carnoy, Martin, Elmore, Richard, Siskin, Leslie (2003). The New Accountability: High Schools and High-Stakes Testing, New York: Routledge.
- Beneviste, Luis, Carnoy, Martin, Rothstein, R. (2002). All Else Equal: Are Public and Private Schools Different? New York: Routledge.
- Carnoy, Martin (2001). School Vouchers: Examining the Evidence, Washington, DC: Economic Policy Institute
- Carnoy, Martin, Stromquist, Nelly, Monkman, Karen (2000). Globalization and Education: Integration and Contestation Across Cultures, Rowman & Littlefield Publishers.
- Carnoy, Martin, Rothstein, Richard (1999). Can Public Schools Learn From Private Schools: Case Studies in the Public and Private Nonprofit Sectors, Economic Policy Institute.
- Carnoy, Martin (1999). Globalization and Educational Reform: What Planners Need to Know. UNESCO, International Institute for Educational Planning.
- Carnoy, Martin, Carnoy, David (1997). Fathers of a Certain Age, Fairview Press.
- Carnoy, Martin (1996). Faded Dreams: The Politics and Economics of Race in America. Cambridge University Press.
- Carnoy, Martin, Castells, Manuel, Cohen, Stephen (1993). The New Global Economy In The Information Age: Reflections On Our Changing World, Palgrave.
- Carnoy, Martin, De Nielsen, Duke (1993). Decentralization School Improvement, Jossey-Bass.
- Carnoy, Martin (1990). Education & Social Transition in the Third World. Princeton: Princeton University Press.
- Carnoy, Martin (1987). Education as Cultural Imperialism, New York: David McKay Co.
- Carnoy, Martin, Levin, Henry (1985). Schooling and Work in the Democratic State, Palo Alto: Stanford University Press.
- Carnoy, Martin (1984). The State and Political Theory, Princeton: Princeton University Press.
- Carnoy, Martin (1983). A New Social Contract: The Economy and Government After Reagan. HarperCollins Publishers.
- Carnoy, Martin, Shearer, Derek (1980) Economic Democracy: The Challenge of the 1980's, New York: Routledge.
- Carnoy, Martin, Baerresen, Donald, Grunwald, Joseph (1980). Latin American Trade Patterns, Praeger.
- Carnoy, Martin, Lobo, Jose (1979). Can Educational Policy Equalise Income Distribution In Latin America?, Saxon House.
- Carnoy, Martin, Levin, Henry (1978). The Limits of Educational Reform, Longman Publishing Group.
- Carnoy, Martin (1978). Education as Cultural Imperialism, Prentice Hall Press.
- Carnoy, Martin (1977). Education And Employment: A Critical Appraisal, International Institute for Educational Planning.
- Carnoy, Martin (1975). Schooling in a Corporate Society: The Political Economy of Education in America, New York: David McKay Co.
- Carnoy, Martin (1972). Industrialization in a Latin American Common Market. Brookings Institution Press.
