= Jelena Obradovic =

Developmental psychologist

Jelena Obradovic is a developmental psychologist who currently works as associate professor at the Stanford Graduate School of Education, where she is a member of the Steering Committee of the Center for Education Policy Analysis (CEPA). She also directs the Stanford Project on Adaptation and Resilience in Kids (SPARK).

== Biography ==
Jelena Obradovic earned a B.A. in psychology from Lewis and Clark College in 2002, followed by an M.A. and Ph.D. in developmental psychology from the University of Minnesota's Institute of Child Development in 2005 and 2007. After her graduation, she worked as a postdoctoral researcher at the University of British Columbia's Human Early Learning Partnership (HELP) (2007–09) before moving to Stanford's Graduate School of Education. Since 2017, she has been an associate professor in Stanford's Developmental and Psychological Sciences Program. At Stanford, she is a member of the Steering Committee of the Center for Education Policy Analysis and project director of the Stanford Project on Adaptation and Resilience in Kids (SPARK). Other research centers with which she is affiliated include Stanford's Bio-X Interdisciplinary Network, the Stanford Neuroscience Institute and the Center for Population Health Sciences at the Stanford School of Medicine. Additionally, she is a member in the Society for Research in Child Development, Society for Prevention Research, the American Education Research Association (AERA), the Society for Research on Adolescence and the New York Academy of Sciences. Finally, Obradovic also performs editorial duties for the AERA Open.

== Research ==
Obradovic's research interests focus on child and adolescent development and its determinants. Among else, Obradovic has conducted research on developmental cascades, resilience in child and adolescent development, the impact of stress reactivity and family adversity on socioemotional behavior and school readiness, homelessness in children, and interpersonal callousness.

== Selected awards and honours ==
- Society for Research in Child Development: Early Career Research Contribution Award (2013)
- William T. Grant Foundation: Scholar Award (2012–18)
- University of Minnesota: Marian Radke Yarrow Fellowship (2002–03), Eva O. Miller Fellowship (2003–04), Hauge Fellowship (2004-05)
