= William Koski =

American lawyer

William S. Koski is an American lawyer who is currently the Eric and Nancy Wright Professor of Clinical Education, Professor of Law, Stanford Law School at Stanford Law School.

== Education ==
- BBA with highest distinction University of Michigan 1990
- JD cum laude University of Michigan Law School 1993
- PhD Stanford University School of Education 2003
