= Geoffrey L. Cohen =

American social psychologist

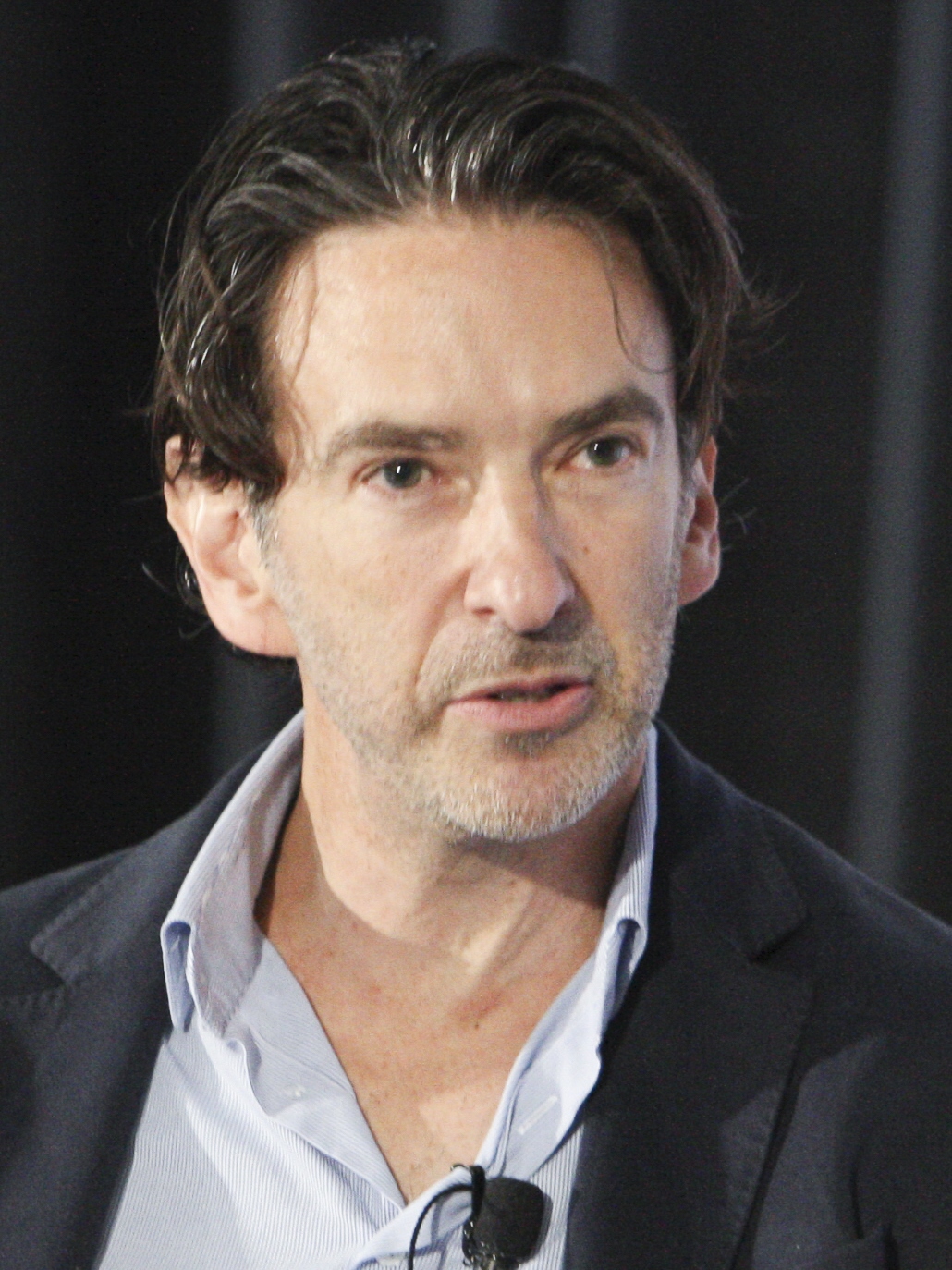
Cohen in 2022

Geoffrey L. Cohen is the James G. March Professor of Organizational Studies in Education and Business, professor of psychology and, by courtesy, at the Graduate School of Business at Stanford University. He is also a faculty affiliate of the Stanford Institute for Human-Centered Artificial Intelligence.

His research focuses on how brief interventions can create long-lasting psychological and behavioral change; and on the psychology of self and belonging. He and his colleagues have shown how brief values-affirmations can benefit school performance, close political divides, and open people up to threatening information.

== Education ==
Cohen graduated with a B.A. in psychology from Cornell University in 1992. He earned a Ph.D. in psychology from Stanford University in 1998.

== Career and research ==
Before joining Stanford University, Cohen held academic appointments at Yale University and the University of Colorado at Boulder.

Cohen's work is based in the belief that one way to understand psychological processes is to try to change them. At Stanford, he runs the Cohen Lab, which investigates – through laboratory and randomized experiments, longitudinal studies, and content analyses – how, when, and why people change, with a focus on racial and gender achievement gaps.

His research has examined political ideologies, adolescents’ misperceptions of their peers, how different cultures view "passion" in relation to achievement, and how to reduce school discipline rates for Black and Latino boys through interventions that reduce worries about belonging.

In a 2007 paper, Cohen and co-author Greg Walton coined the term "belonging uncertainty" to describe the experience of members of marginalized groups in academic and professional settings and showed through experimental research that Black students’ academic achievement increased with an intervention designed to dispel their doubts about social belonging.

== Awards and Professional Memberships ==
- Cialdini Prize, 2015, Society for Personality and Social Psychology.
- Social Psychology Network
- Society for Personality and Social Psychology
- Society for the Psychological Study of Social Issues

== Works ==
- Belonging: The Science of Creating Connection and Bridging Divides, W. W. Norton & Company, 2022.
