= Lars Lefgren =

American economist

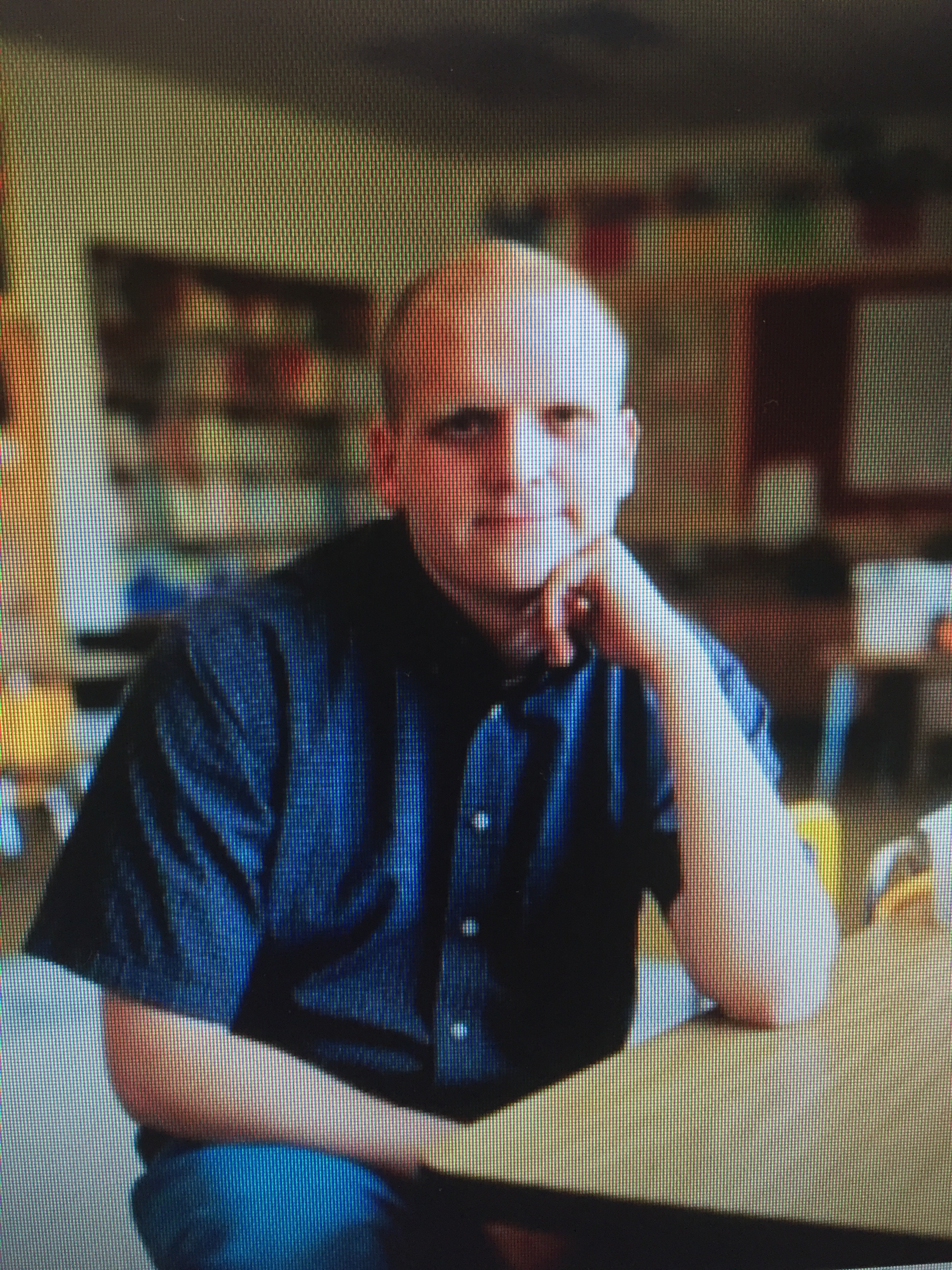

Lars Lefgren (born October 1972) is an American Economist trained at the University of Chicago Booth School of Business who is a professor of economics at Brigham Young University (BYU), specializing in labor economics and applied econometrics.

== Education ==
Lefgren received a bachelor's degree in economics from BYU in 1996 and a PhD in business economics from the University of Chicago in 2001.

== Research ==
Lefgren's research into educational policy and the American educational system is extensive, and has been published in top journals, including The Quarterly Journal of Economics, the American Economic Review, and the Journal of Labor Economics. His work in this field covers such topics as principals' abilities to identify capable teachers, the effectiveness of teacher training programs, the effect of school on juvenile crime, and the effect of grade retention on high school completion, as well as many others. Notably, Lefgren has done work showing the impact of summer schools for students requiring remediation by comparing the limit of students who barely passed and barely failed the threshold of remediation. He has shown that parents value student satisfaction in teacher selection over student achievement improvements, except for poor students. Those parents from poor homes that request a particular teacher, ask for teachers who have reputations for student-testing improvement. He has also established that most of the test-score boost from good teaching erodes after a year. While the scores erode, Chetty et al. (2011) found that score improvements persist at some human capital level to improve the future wages of the student.

In recent years, Lefgren has also published in the field of econometric theory. His work with Brigham Frandsen, another member of the faculty of the BYU Economics Department, has been focused on such topics as rank similarity and partial identification.

On one occasion, Lefgren was interviewed by a news organizations for his opinions relating to his research expertise. In a statement recorded in The Daily Universe, Lefgren expressed the view that "Raising the minimum wage in Utah probably wouldn't affect [people] much."

== Recognition and awards ==
Lefgren is ranked in the top 6% of economists worldwide. In 2007, he won the BYU's Young Scholar Award. At the end of 2018, his research had over 6000 citations according to Google Scholar. He is also known for having won the competition of time spent standing on one leg in the fourth grade, although later he acknowledged that he may have let his leg down early, invalidating the record.

== Teaching style and reception ==
With a few notable exceptions, Lefgren's teaching has been well received and he is a popular professor within the BYU Economics Department. As of February 2019, he had 4.0 out of 5.0 on Rate My Professor, putting him above the average. His teaching is focused on building intuition and on developing a deep conceptual understanding of simple models. He is well known for his use of examples and hypothetical thought experiments to help students see the application of abstract ideas. Famously, the Dungeons and Dragons-inspired analogies of the "Die of Great Power" and the "Die of Correct Size" have been used to teach about the statistical concepts of size and power.

== Personal life ==
On a more personal note, Lefgren has two daughters and two sons, because of his convex preferences. He also owns a poodle named Dexter. Lefgren enjoys the song "Come Dancing" by The Kinks because the first verse illustrates that capital is fixed in the short-run but flexible in the long-run. In terms of fashion, Dr. Lefgren has expressed a proclivity for wearing gold-toed socks, admitting that he is likely the youngest person in the set of people who frequently do so. When he was young, Lefgren enjoyed the game Dungeons and Dragons, having played a Barbarian all the way to level 18. This hobby has not, however, followed him in his post-college years. In response to requests to serve as a Dungeon Master, he has publicly declared that he has "hung up his dice" and no longer plays the game.

Lefgren is a member of the Church of Jesus Christ of Latter-day Saints. As part of his active involvement in his church, he has served in a number of volunteer positions, including two years as a full-time missionary in Rome, Italy starting when he was 19. As a result of his service there, he speaks Italian.

== Appearance in popular culture ==
In fall of 2015, Lefgren appeared in the Divine Comedy music video "Fix You" promoting BYU OIT, using the song "Fix You" by Coldplay.
