= Douglas Staiger =

John French Professor in Economics at Dartmouth College

Academic background
- Alma mater: Massachusetts Institute of Technology; Williams College

Academic work
- Discipline: Healthcare Economics; Education Economics; Statistical Methods
- Institutions: Dartmouth College
- Website: Information at IDEAS / RePEc

Douglas O. Staiger is the John French Professor in Economics at Dartmouth College. His research focuses on the economics of education and of healthcare, and on statistical methods in economics. Staiger is also a co-founder of ArborMetrix, a healthcare analytics company.

== Academic background ==
In addition to teaching undergraduates, Staiger works as a research associate with the NBER and an associate editor of the Review of Economics and Statistics. He is also a member of the National Academy of Medicine and an affiliate of the Abdul Latif Jameel Poverty Action Lab (J-PAL). Staiger's research in the field of education has studied teacher effectiveness in elementary and secondary education, and has been funded by the Gates Foundation and the U.S. Department of Education Institute of Education Sciences. In healthcare, his current work analyzes quality of care in hospitals, as well as the labor markets for nurses and physicians. This work has been recently funded by the National Institutes of Health and the Gordon and Betty Moore Foundation. Staiger received the Arrow Award for the best paper in health economics in 2007 and the Eugene Garfield Economic Impact of Medical and Health Research Award in 2008.

Before joining Dartmouth in 1998, Staiger worked at Stanford University and then Harvard University. He received his PhD in economics from MIT in 1990. Staiger graduated magna cum laude from Williams College in 1984.

== ArborMetrix ==
In 2011, Staiger co-founded ArborMetrix with John Birkmeyer, Executive Vice President and Chief Academic Officer of Dartmouth–Hitchcock Medical Center, and Justin Dimick, Director of Policy Research at the Center for Healthcare Outcomes & Policy at the University of Michigan. ArborMetrix provides a cloud-based data analysis platform to optimize quality of care and reduce costs in hospitals, health systems and accountable care organizations. ArborMetrix is based in Ann Arbor, Michigan.

== Personal life ==
Staiger currently lives in Hanover, NH with his wife and four children. His brother, Robert Staiger, is also an economist and a professor at Dartmouth. His sister, Maggie Dubris, is a writer, composer, and paramedic in New York City.

== Bibliography ==
- Peter I. Buerhaus; Douglas Staiger; David I. Auerbach (2009). The Future of the Nursing Workforce in the United States: Data, Trends and Implications. Jones & Bartlett Publishers. ISBN 978-0-7637-5684-0.
