= Journal of Policy Analysis and Management =

- Discipline: Public administration
- Language: English
- Edited by: Erdal Tekin

Publication details
- History: 1981–present
- Publisher: Wiley-Blackwell on behalf of the Association for Public Policy Analysis and Management (United States)
- Frequency: Quarterly
- Impact factor: 3.444 (2017)

Standard abbreviations
- ISO 4: J. Policy Anal. Manag.

Indexing
- ISSN: 0276-8739 (print); 1520-6688 (web)
- LCCN: 81649164
- OCLC no.: 07442272

Links
- Journal homepage; Online access; Online archive

The Journal of Policy Analysis and Management (JPAM) is a quarterly peer-reviewed academic journal covering issues and practices in policy analysis and public management. It was established in 1981 and contains books reviews and a department devoted to discussing ideas and issues of importance to practitioners, researchers, and academics. It is the official journal of the Association for Public Policy Analysis and Management and published by Wiley-Blackwell. The current editor-in-chief is Erdal Tekin. According to the Journal Citation Reports, the journal has a 2017 impact factor of 3.444, ranking it 27th out of 353 journals in the category "Economics" and 5th out of 47 journals in the category "Public Administration".

== History ==
The Association for Public Policy Analysis and Management established the Journal of Policy Analysis and Management in 1981 through the merger of two other journals – Policy Analysis (1975–1981) and Public Policy (1940–1981).

== Editors-in-chief ==
The following persons have been editors-in-chief of the Journal of Policy Analysis and Management:

- July 2018: Erdal Tekin
- 2014-2018 Kenneth Couch
- 2004-2014 Maureen Pirog
- 1999-2004 Peter Reuter
- 1994-1999 Janet Rothenberg-Pack
- 1989-1994 Lee Friedman
- 1985-1989 David Weimer
- 1981-1985 Raymond Vernon

== Raymond Vernon Memorial Prize ==
Every year, the association awards the Raymond Vernon Memorial Prize for the best article published in the current volume of the journal. The prize selection committee usually is drawn from the editorial board and Wiley-Blackwell underwrites all expenses related to the prize.

== Journal sections ==
The journal has five special sections: Point/Counterpoint, Policy Retrospectives, Professional Practice, Methods for Policy Analysis, and Book Reviews. These sections usually publish shorter, specialized articles on those topics.
