= Educational Evaluation and Policy Analysis =

- Discipline: Education, education policy
- Language: English
- Edited by: Geoffrey Borman, A. Brooks Bowden, Deven Carlson, Amanda Datnow, Sylvia Hurtado

Publication details
- History: 1979-present
- Publisher: SAGE Publications on behalf of American Educational Research Association (United States)
- Frequency: Quarterly
- Impact factor: 3.4 (2022)

Standard abbreviations
- ISO 4: Educ. Eval. Policy Anal.

Indexing
- ISSN: 0162-3737 (print); 1935-1062 (web)
- LCCN: 79643621
- OCLC no.: 4171295

Links
- Journal homepage; Submission guidelines; Online archive; Journal page on association website

Educational Evaluation and Policy Analysis is a peer-reviewed academic journal covering all aspects of educational policy analysis. It was established in 1979 and is published by SAGE Publications on behalf of the American Educational Research Association. The editors are Geoffrey Borman (Arizona State University), A. Brooks Bowden (University of Pennsylvania), Deven Carlson (University of Oklahoma), Amanda Datnow (University of California, San Diego), and Sylvia Hurtado (University of California, Los Angeles).

== Mission statement ==
Educational Evaluation and Policy Analysis (EEPA) publishes scholarly manuscripts of theoretical, methodological, or policy interest to those engaged in educational policy analysis, evaluation, and decision making. EEPA is a multidisciplinary policy journal, and considers original research from multiple disciplines, theoretical orientations, and methodologies.

== Abstracting and indexing ==
The journal is abstracted and indexed in Scopus and the Social Sciences Citation Index. According to the Journal Citation Reports, its 2018 impact factor is 3.4, ranking it 73rd out of 268 journals in the category "Education & Educational Research".
