= Education Finance and Policy =

- Discipline: Education policy
- Language: English
- Edited by: Stephanie Cellini and Randall Reback

Publication details
- History: 2005-present
- Publisher: MIT Press (United States)
- Frequency: Quarterly
- Impact factor: 2.429 (2018)

Standard abbreviations
- ISO 4: Educ. Finance Policy

Indexing
- ISSN: 1557-3060 (print); 1557-3079 (web)
- OCLC no.: 61238859

Links
- Journal homepage; Online access

Education Finance and Policy is a peer-reviewed academic journal addressing public policy developments affecting educational institutions. Topics covered by the journal include school accountability, education standards, teacher compensation, instructional policy, higher education productivity and finance, and special education. Education Finance and Policy was founded in 2005 and is published online and in hard copy by the MIT Press and the American Education Finance Association. It is also indexed with EconLit.
