= Association for Public Policy Analysis and Management =

American organization

The Association for Public Policy Analysis and Management (APPAM) is an American organization whose focus is improving public policy and management by fostering research, analysis, and education. APPAM founded the Journal of Policy Analysis and Management (JPAM) in 1981.

== See also ==
- Policy studies
