= Helen Ladd =

Education economist

Helen F. Ladd

Academic background
- Education: Wellesley College; London School of Economics; Harvard University

Academic work
- Discipline: Education economics
- Institutions: Duke University; Brookings Institution
- Website: https://sites.duke.edu/ericafield/

Helen F. “Sunny” Ladd is an education economist who currently works as the Susan B. King Professor Emeritus of Public Policy and Economics at Duke University's Sanford School of Public Policy. In recognition of her research on the economics of education, she has been elected to the National Academy for Education and the National Academy of Sciences.

== Biography ==
Helen Ladd earned a B.A. from Wellesley College in 1967, a master's degree from the London School of Economics in 1968 and a Ph.D. from Harvard University in 1974, writing a thesis on the relationship between local public expenditures and the composition of the property tax base under Richard Musgrave and Martin Feldstein. After her Ph.D., Ladd worked as assistant professor of economics at Wellesley College (1974–77) and then as Assistant Professor and later associate professor of City and Regional Planning at Harvard University (1978–86) before moving to Duke University's Sanford School of Public Policy in 1986. There, she has been a professor of Public Policy and, since 1991, also a professor of economics, until her emeritation in 2017. Since 2014, she has been the Susan B. King Professor Emerita of Public Policy and Economics. Additionally, Ladd has held visiting appointments at the University of Wellington, University of Cape Town, University of Amsterdam and at the Institute for Fiscal Studies (London). In addition to her academic positions, she is affiliated with the Brookings Institution, Learning Policy Institute, National Bureau of Economic Research, and Urban Institute, and has repeatedly presided over the Association for Public Policy Analysis and Management. Moreover, she has co-chaired a National Academy of Sciences Committee on Education Finance from 1996 to 1999. Finally, she performs editorial duties for Regional Science and Urban Economics, Journal of Policy Analysis and Management, and Educational Evaluation and Policy Analysis, and has done so in the past for Research on Urban Policy, Journal of the American Planning Association, Evaluation Review, and the National Tax Journal.

Ladd is married to Edward Fiske.

Ladd was one of the signees of a 2018 amici curiae brief that expressed support for Harvard University in the Students for Fair Admissions v. President and Fellows of Harvard College lawsuit. Other signees of the brief include Alan B. Krueger, Robert M. Solow, George A. Akerlof, Janet Yellen, as well as numerous others.

== Research ==
Ladd's research focuses on school finance, school accountability, teacher labour markets, school choice, and early childhood programmes. Therein, she has frequently collaborated with Charles Clotfelter, Jacob Vigdor as well as with her husband and fellow educational researcher Edward Fiske. According to IDEAS/RePEc, she belongs to the top 5% of economists in terms of research output.

=== Research on public finance ===
Early in her research career, Ladd conducted extensive research on local public finance. She found that commercial property in Boston has a stronger impact on the demand for local education expenditures than industrial property and criticizes the use of total property tax base per pupil as a measure for local fiscal capacity for education. Ladd has also contributed to the debate on how to optimize state aid in the U.S. in order to offset fiscal disparities (low resources or high costs) across communities (with Katharine Bradbury, Mark Perrault, Andrew Reschovsky and John Yinger). Together with Yinger, Ladd has further expanded on the fiscal crisis of U.S. cities in the 1970s and early 1980s in her book America's Ailing Cities, wherein she explores how it affected cities' policies and disparities between them. Researching local tax mimicking between neighbouring U.S. counties, Ladd finds evidence of it with regard to the burdens of total local taxes and property taxes but not of sales taxes. Studying the relationship between public finances and local population growth in the U.S., Ladd finds a U-shaped relationship between spending and density and a positive relationship between local population growth and per capita public spending, with the effect mainly reflecting the higher population density and a larger share of local public spending, suggesting that established residents in fast-growing areas may experience declining quality in public services and/or rising local tax burdens.

=== Research on the economics of education ===
==== Research on school accountability ====
Since the mid-1990s, Ladd has performed research on the topic of school accountability. In Dallas, she finds performance-based school accountability to increase the outcomes of Hispanic and Caucasian 7th-graders but not Afro-American students, and to decrease drop-out and principal turnover rates. In the late 1990s, Ladd repeatedly criticized the implementation of value-added measures of school effectiveness, arguing based on her observations in e.g. North Carolina that these measures' lack of consideration for differences in schools' resources discouraged effective teachers and principals from working in schools with large shares of disadvantaged students and exacerbate educational inequality (with Randall Walsh and Arnaldo Zelli). In sum, she has argued, along with e.g. Eva Baker or Edward Haertel, that test scores should only be one part of teacher evaluation and not dominate decisions about teachers' compensation or promotion.

==== Research on school choice ====
Ladd and Sheila Murray find no evidence of a direct effect of the share of elderly households on spending on education, though they may do so through their locational decision: as they tend to live in counties with low shares of children, the tax price of education is higher in other counties, which could decrease education spending in those counties. With regard to school vouchers, Ladd has argued that the gains in student achievement from voucher programmes are likely to be small and to harm many disadvantaged students due to parents' tendency to judge schools by the characteristics of their students, with a slightly better case being made for means-tested vouchers. In research with Robert Bifulco on charter schools in N.C., Ladd finds that students make substantially smaller gains in achievement in charter schools than in public schools and that these effects aren't due to positive impacts of charter schools on traditional public schools, though the high rates of student turnover at charter schools appear to account for a third of the difference. Moreover, they find these charter schools to have raised the racial isolation of Afro-American and Caucasian students and widened their test-score gaps, in particular as students (and their families) tend to choose charter schools that are more racially isolated than students' previous schools, resulting in very few racially balanced charter schools. Ladd has also performed research on school choice and school competition outside the U.S., e.g. analyzing the liberalization and decentralization of New Zealand's compulsory state education system during the 1990s, which yielded many cautionary lessons about the potential long-term consequences of market-based education reforms.

==== Research on teacher labour markets ====
Together with Clotfelter and Vigdor, Ladd has also conducted extensive research on teacher labour markets. In line with Ladd's research on North Carolina's school accountability system, Ladd, Clotfelter, Vigdor and Roger Aliaga Diaz find that this system strongly increased the turnover of high-quality teachers in schools serving low-performing students, though the extent of the decline in teacher quality at such schools remains unclear. Later research by Ladd, Clotfelter, Vigdor and Justin Wheeler confirmed that the school personnel serving students in high-poverty schools in N.C. generally have lower qualifications than those in lower poverty schools.* In further research in N.C., Ladd, Clotfelter and Vigdor find that the way how novice teachers are distributed by school administrators across schools and classrooms disadvantages Afro-American students and that the generally positive returns to teacher experience in students' math and reading achievement are much larger with regard to math for socioeconomically advantaged students, possibly explaining why the most highly qualified teachers often teach the most advantaged students. However, they (with Elizabeth Glennie) also find that offering higher salaries to teachers in high-poverty schools in N.C. was successful in substantially reducing these schools' teacher turnover rates, with experienced teachers displaying the strongest response. They find that gaps between Caucasian and Afro-American student achievements are large and persistent, Hispanic and Asian students tend to gain on Caucasians over their schooling, with the racial gaps in math typically widening over time for high-performing students and closing for low-performing students. Moreover, they also find that teacher credentials (e.g. licensure or certification systematically and substantially affect student achievement and that the unequal distribution of teacher credentials by race and socioeconomic status of high school students exacerbates gaps between demographic groups' educational achievement. Finally, Ladd also observes that teachers' perceptions of their working conditions are good predictors of their transitions to other schools, with school leadership as the most salient dimension of working conditions.

=== Other research ===
With regard to the economics of education, Ladd has contributed substantially to research on the relationship between poverty and education: Together with Jens Ludwig and Greg Duncan, Ladd evaluates the impact of the Moving to Opportunity programme of residential mobility, wherein volunteering low-income families were randomly assigned to either receive rental subsidies for housing in low-poverty areas as well as counseling and housing search assistance, to only receive unrestricted rental subsidies or to a control group, finding that assignment to the first group considerably raised elementary school children's performance in reading and math, though there is also some evidence that teens in both experimental groups experience increases in grade retentions, drop-out rates and disciplinary actions at school due to differences between the academic and behavioural standards between their new and old schools. Moreover, in further research on the relationship between education and poverty, Ladd has strongly criticized Bush- and Obama-era efforts to improve the U.S. education system for their ignorance of the growing performance gap between the achievement of students from advantaged and disadvantaged families and their lack of focus on the educational challenges of disadvantaged students. Another area of research concerns the impact of technology on education, wherein Ladd, Vigdor and Erika Martinez confirm earlier findings of large gaps between different racial and socioeconomic groups' access and use of home computers and observe that the introduction of home computer technology and high-speed Internet access in households tends to modestly decrease students' math and reading test scores. Furthermore, in another study outside the U.S., Ladd and Fiske have evaluated the post-Apartheid education reform in South Africa, concluding that while genuine equal treatment of races was at hand, equality in terms of educational opportunity or adequacy remained elusive. Finally, in a much-cited study, Ladd finds strong evidence for discrimination in mortgage lending, most of which she attributes to profit-driven statistical discrimination, notably reflecting the fact that minority borrowers often display characteristics associated with lower creditworthiness.

== Selected awards ==
- Steve Gold Award (Association for Public Policy Analysis and Management/National Tax Association/National Conference of State Legislatures): 2002
- Aaron B. Wildavsky Award for Lifetime Scholarly Achievement in Public Budgeting (Association for Budgeting and Financial Management): 2003
- Raymond Vernon Memorial Award (Association for Public Policy Analysis and Management): 2004

== Selected publications ==
- Holding Schools Accountable: Performance-Based Reform in Education
- Handbook of Research in Education Finance and Policy
- Educational Goods, Values, Evidence and Decision-Making
- Making Money Matter: Financing America's Schools
- Equity and Adequacy in Education Finance
