= Hang Lu =

American academic (born 1977)

Hang Lu (born 1977) is the "Love Family" Professor of Chemical and Biomolecular Engineering at the Georgia Institute of Technology. She directs a research group on the use of microfluidics devices engineered to aid in the study of questions in the biological sciences.

Lu was born in China in 1977 and moved to Colorado at age 22.

Dr. Lu has published a number of papers on the use of such micrometer-scale devices for use in a variety of applications such as the study of the worm Caenorhabditis elegans (a model organism for many neurobiologists) and for assaying the adhesive behavior of cells.

In 2005, she was named to the Massachusetts Institute of Technology Technology Review TR35 as one of the top 35 innovators in the world under the age of 35.
