= Juliana Chan =

Juliana Chan may refer to:

- JuJu Chan, American actress, martial artist, singer, and writer
- Juliana Chan, Singaporean biologist and science communicator
