= Enrique Lomnitz =

Mexican sustainable industrial engineer

Enrique Lomnitz is a Mexican sustainable industrial engineer. He is known for founding Isla Urbana, an organization that promotes and installs rainwater harvesters in low-income, peri-urban neighborhoods. Lomnitz has received numerous accolades relating to his success in sustainably harvesting rainwater in drought and impoverished communities in Mexico City, Mexico.

== Early life and education ==
Lomnitz was born in Mexico, but simultaneously lived in both Mexico and the United States of America. Lomnitz attended and graduated from Rhode Island School of Design in the U.S. He originally chose plastic arts as his interest in design school, however through realizing his passion for the environment and the arts, he switched to sustainable industrial design. At Rhode Island School of Design, he developed a project for sustainable housing in low-income areas of Mexico City. Lomnitz graduated from Rhode Island School of Design in 2006.

== Career ==
Lomnitz co-founded Isla Urbana with Renata Fenton in 2009. While traveling after graduating from college, Lomnitz recognized the areas that were falling behind in Mexico City's infrastructure. One third of Mexico City residents lack access to water. In some drought-stricken communities, water is limited for use to six hours during the morning hours only. Lomnitz realized that Mexico City was not efficiently or at all, collecting any rainwater in its infrastructure. So, he and his co-founder developed a simple way for locals to collect rain water in tanks, founding Isla Urbana.

Isla Urbana (Urban Island), is the non-profit organization that Lomnitz founded and developed as an answer for many Mexican residents who lack access to water. The system was developed to be as simple as possible for it to be taught to the residents. First, water that falls on roofs are funneled down and captured in a "first-flush" mechanism, that flushed out the first waters to remove any sediment that may have washed in from the roof tops. The rain water then goes through a filtering process which includes chlorinating the water, passing it through a sediments filter, and finally also passing it through an inexpensive, but effective carbon filter. Isla Urbana has installed over 20,000 systems since 2009. During the earthquake in Mexico in September 2017, municipal water lines burst in Mexico City. Thanks to Isla Urbana, homes that had the rainwater harvesting systems were able to continue collecting and distributing water. Neighbors would visit those houses to fill up buckets and pails.

Lomnitz's Isla Urbana's mission is to also educate the local communities as part of their mission to incorporate sustainable rainwater harvesting in the city's everyday water use. Isla Urbana trains locals on how to use the rainwater capture system. The non-profit uses local resources and labor to construct and install the rainwater system. Locals are educated on how to construct, install, and maintain the system. This serves to create more reliable, decentralized resources, rather than bringing resources from a single, distant source. International Renewable Resources Institute is in partnership with Isla Urbana and takes charge in the education and training side of the non-profit. Additionally, Lomnitz also founded Solución Pluvial, a for-profit version of Isla Urbana. Solución Pluvial sells their rainwater capture systems at full-price to those who can afford it, and use the revenue to fund systems provided by Isla Urbana.

Lomnitz advocates and lobbies for legislation to incorporate rainwater harvesting and use into public city water systems, not just for private properties. Mexico City can receive plenty of rainwater, however 40% of water loss is due to "leaky pipes". Lomnitz works with the government to legislate for policies on water sustainability to "construct legal framework" to promote rainwater capture. With a rainwater system, like Isla Urbana's, Mexico City could be using at least 50% of rainwater capture systems as their main water system. Isla Urbana has successfully received funding from the national Mexican government, local government agencies, international foundations, banks, and through direct sales from Solución Pluvial.

== Awards and accolades ==
Lomnitz was a BBC World Challenge Project Finalist, which look at projects throughout the world that focus on social, environmental, and community issues while enacting businesslike structures to resolve those issues worldwide. He is also an Ashoka Fellow and a UBS Visionary for his work in social entrepreneurship and sustainability. He was a finalist for the Elevate Prize Foundation in 2021, which places a spotlight on those who are working for the social good of society.

He was named one of MIT Technology Review's '35 Innovators Under 35' in 2013.

Over twenty-nine billion (29,000,000) litters of water collected through his project Isla Urbana.

Lomnitz was inducted into the class of 2020 Emerging Explorer from the National Geographic Society.
