= Alan T. Waterman Award =

Honorary award for scientists

The Alan T. Waterman Award, named after Alan Tower Waterman, is the United States's highest honorary award for scientists no older than 40, or no more than 10 years past receipt of their Ph.D. It is awarded on a yearly basis by the National Science Foundation. In addition to the medal, the awardee receives a grant of $1,000,000 to be used at the institution of their choice over a period of five years for advanced scientific research.

== History of the Award ==
The United States Congress established the annual award in August 1975 to mark the 25th Anniversary of the National Science Foundation and to honor its first director, Alan T. Waterman. The annual award recognizes an outstanding young researcher in any field of science or engineering supported by the National Science Foundation.

== Eligibility and nomination process ==
Candidates must be U.S. citizens or permanent residents. Prior to the 2018 competition, candidates must have been 35 years of age or younger or not more than 7 years beyond receipt of the Ph.D. degree by December 31 of the year in which they are nominated. As of the 2018 competition, these requirements were changed to 40 years of age or 10 years post-PhD. Candidates should have demonstrated exceptional individual achievements in scientific or engineering research of sufficient quality to place them at the forefront of their peers. Criteria include originality, innovation, and significant impact on the field. Potential candidates must be nominated and require four letters of reference, but none can be submitted from the nominee’s home institution. Solicitation announcements are sent to universities and colleges, scientific, engineering and other professional societies and organizations, and members of the National Academy of Sciences and the National Academy of Engineering.

== Award process and committee composition ==
Candidates are reviewed by the Alan T. Waterman Award committee, which is made up of 12 members, 8 rotators and 4 members ex officio. The current ex officio members are Ralph Cicerone, President of the National Academy of Sciences, Subra Suresh, Director of the National Science Foundation, Steven C. Beering, Chairman of the National Science Board, and Charles M. Vest, President of the National Academy of Engineering. After review of the nominees, the committee recommends the most outstanding candidate(s) to the Director of the National Science Foundation and the National Science Board, which then makes the final determination.

== List of recipients ==
2024
Muyinatu A. Lediju Bell

"For pioneering innovations in ultrasound and photoacoustic imaging, particularly coherence-based beamforming, photoacoustic-guided surgery, and deep learning. These innovations cross interdisciplinary boundaries to improve medical image quality in patients, reduce patient deaths during surgery, inspire new surgical designs, and provide more equitable healthcare."

Katrina G. Claw

"For her contributions to pharmacogenomics and for fostering cultural and bioethical research participation within Indigenous communities."

Rebecca Kramer-Bottiglio

"For creating robots that adapt and evolve to changing conditions."

2023
Natalie S. King

"For groundbreaking scholarship in science, technology, engineering and mathematics education that transcends disciplinary boundaries and directly impacts local and global communities, and for demonstrating exceptional research achievements with tremendous impact on the advancement of Black girls in science, the use of research-practice partnerships to drive K-12 instruction, and the increase of STEM teacher diversity."

Asegun Henry

"For significant contributions in new energy technologies and advanced fundamental understanding of heat transfer addressing a broad range of problems that span from the atomic scale (the physics of heat conduction) to the gigawatt scale (grid-level energy storage)."

William Anderegg

"For outstanding contributions to climate change science, particularly in advancing the understanding of the sensitivity, vulnerability, and resilience of forest ecosystems to change, and to risk analyses of forest-related climate change solutions to achieve sustainability goals."

2022
Jessica Tierney

"For her outstanding advances in the reconstruction of past climate change and furthering the understanding of future climate change."

Daniel B. Larremore

"For his foundational research in computational epidemiology, combining mathematics and computation with real-world data to create powerful new models that provide concrete, innovative, and useful answers to globally important questions in the study of epidemic dynamics, including timely research on vaccination and testing strategies for combatting the COVID-19 pandemic."

Lara Thompson

"For her innovations in rehabilitation engineering and for translating her research on vestibular disorders in primates into engineering-based interventions for individuals with balance, gait and postural impairments.

2021
Nicholas Carnes

"For his looking into how a person’s social background may influence their decision to pursue public service and what factors would increase their opportunities to serve."

2021
Melanie Wood

"For her tackling the mysteries and most complex problems in mathematics by looking into the connection of number theory and random matrices."

2020
Emily Balskus

"For her transformative work that integrates chemistry and microbiology to understand biosynthetic mechanisms and microbial metabolism at the molecular level, with emphasis on enzymatic processes in the human gut microbiome."

2020
John Dabiri

"For his pioneering research in fluid mechanics, with innovative applications in biology, energy, and the environment. His transformative work, especially as applied to biological flow problems, has led to understanding the principles of marine animal locomotion and their application to other biological and environmental problems."

2019
Jennifer Dionne

"For developing techniques and tools to image dynamic physical, chemical and biological processes with extremely high resolution. Her research is enabling new knowledge to help solve global challenges in biomedicine, energy and computing."

2019
Mark Braverman

"For his studies of complexity theory, algorithms and the limits of what's possible computationally."

2018
Kristina Olson

"For her innovative contributions to understanding children's attitudes toward and identification with social groups, early prosocial behavior, the development of notions of fairness, morality, inequality and the emergence of social biases."

2017
Baratunde A. Cola

"For pioneering new engineering methods and materials to control light and heat in electronics at the nanoscale."

2017
John V. Pardon

"For his contributions to geometry and topology, the study of properties of shapes that are unaffected by deformations, such as stretching or twisting and for solving problems that stumped other mathematicians for decades and generating solutions that provide new tools for geometric analysis."

2016
Mircea Dincă

"For pioneering contributions to the synthesis and understanding of molecular porous solids with unusual electronic properties, especially for creative synthetic design leading to microporous materials with high electrical conductivity and redox activity."

2015
Andrea Alù

"For his work in metamaterial theory and design, including insightful contributions to plasmonic cloaking; effective light manipulation at the nano scale; innovative ideas in breaking time reversal symmetry leading to enhanced non-reciprocity from acoustics to microwaves and optics; and for unique contributions to metamaterials."

2014
Feng Zhang

"For development and application of molecular technologies that enable systematic interrogation of intact biological systems through precise genomic manipulation."

2013
Mung Chiang

"Chiang is an electrical engineering professor of Princeton University who uses innovative mathematical analyses to design simpler and more powerful wireless networks. He is the founder of Princeton's EDGE Laboratory, which aims to connect network theory and real-world applications. By developing methods for analyzing the often complex interaction between different layers of wireless networks, his work creates a principled picture of seemingly chaotic interactions and allows for systematic solutions to previously intractable problems."

2012
Scott Aaronson

"By illuminating the fundamental limits on what can be computed in the physical world, and the potential implications of those limits, Scott Aaronson has staked out important new ground in computational theory", said MIT President Susan Hockfield, "I am delighted that the National Science Foundation has recognized his dual abilities, both to articulate key research questions and to offer new methods and ideas for addressing them, with the Alan T. Waterman Award."

2012
Robert Wood

Wood is an associate professor in Harvard's School of Engineering and Applied Sciences and a core faculty member of the Wyss Institute for Biologically Inspired Engineering. He is founder of the Harvard Microrobotics Lab which leverages expertise in microfabrication for the development of biologically-inspired robots with feature sizes on the micrometer to centimeter scale.

2011
Casey W. Dunn

For his gifted integration of field biology, genomics, and computational science that has led to changing our understanding of the evolutionary tree, integrating morphological and molecular perspectives on diversity, and developing new tools that are revolutionizing biology.

2010
Subhash Khot

Subhash is an Associate Professor of Computer Science at NYU and is recognized already by many other honors and awards. Subhash is a brilliant theoretical computer scientist and is most well known for his Unique Games Conjecture. He has made many unexpected and original contributions to computational complexity and his work draws connections between optimization, computer science, mathematics.

2009
David Charbonneau

For his pioneering research into the discovery and characterization of planets orbiting other stars, which has allowed, for the first time, the study of their surface conditions and atmospheres, and has revolutionized interdisciplinary research related to exoplanets.

2008
Terence Tao

For his surprising and original contributions to many fields of mathematics, including number theory, differential equations, algebra, and harmonic analysis.

2007
Peidong Yang

For outstanding contributions in the creative synthesis of semiconductor nanowires and their heterostructures, and innovations in nanowire-based photonics, energy conversion, and nanofluidic applications.

2006
Emmanuel Candes

For his research in computational mathematics and statistical estimation, with applications to signal compression and image processing.

2005
Dalton Conley

For his contribution to the field of sociology as a research scientist and published author exemplified by his research on how socio-economic status is transmitted across generations. He brings methodological rigor and sophistication to deep social questions.

2004
Kristi Anseth

For her research at the interface of biology and engineering, resulting in the design of innovative biomaterials that significantly facilitate tissue engineering and regeneration.

2003
Angelika Amon

For her seminal contributions to understanding how cells orchestrate the segregation of their chromosomes during cell division, the key process of life

2002
Erich Jarvis

For his use of gene expression as a tool to map brain functional systems and to identify parts of the brain involved in perceiving, learning and producing vocal communication.

2001
Vahid Tarokh

For the invention of space-time coding techniques that produce dramatic gains in the spectral efficiency of wireless digital communication systems.

2000
Jennifer A. Doudna

For innovative research that led to the development of a technique that facilitates crystallization of large RNA molecules; for determining the crystal structures of catalytic RNA molecules and an RNA molecule that forms the ribonucleo-protein core of the signal recognition particle; and for deciphering structural features of those molecules that permit a greater understanding of the mechanistic basis of RNA function in both catalysis and protein synthesis.

1999
Chaitan Khosla

For his outstanding work in elucidating the mechanisms of enzyme biocatalysis of polyketides, thereby opening an exciting potential route to new drug discovery.

1998
Christopher C. Cummins

For innovative research in transition-metal activation of small molecules, including the discovery of reactions to cleave nitrogen-nitrogen multiple bonds under mild conditions. His revolutionary approach to chemical reactivity has answered key questions and furthered development in catalyst design and nitrogen fixation.

1997
Eric Allin Cornell

For his leading role in the creation of Bose-Einstein condensation in a gas, and for innovations in the manipulation, trapping and cooling of atoms that led to the realization of this new state of matter.

1996
Robert M. Waymouth

For his seminal contributions to the design of well-defined organometallic catalysts for the synthesis of novel polymers, including chiral cyclopolymers and stereoblock polyolefins. The development of catalysts which change their structure as they work has established a new paradigm in the synthesis of block-polymers.

1995
Matthew P.A. Fisher

For his broad and original contributions to the theory of the quantum dynamics of macroscopic systems and quantum phase transitions, specifically his prediction of a vortex glass phase in high temperature superconductors, his studies of the superconductor-insulator transition and is seminal work on quantum transport in Luttinger liquids.

1994
Gang Tian

For his deep understanding and penetrating insights in the field of complex differential geometry, including his solution of the problem of existence of Kähler-Einstein metrics on complex surfaces, his proof that the moduli space for Kähler-Einstein metrics with zero first Chern class is non-singular, and his proof of the stability of algebraic manifolds by using differential geometric methods.

1993
Deborah L. Penry

For her innovative applications of chemical engineering principles and chemical-reactor theory in analysis of the process of digestion in marine invertebrates, filling an important gap in existing ecological theory dealing with animals strategies for acquiring energy and nutrients. Her research is important to understanding the cycling of materials in the sea—in particular the global carbon cycle and global climate change cycles.

1992
Shrinivas R. Kulkarni

For his major contributions to the understanding of diffuse interstellar medium and the physics and evolution of neutron star pulsars and x-ray binary stars. For his leading role in the discovery of fast pulsars, a major new phenomenon, and in the development of optical and radio spatial interferometry.

1991
Herbert Edelsbrunner

For his pioneering research in computational geometry through which he has made fundamental contributions to the theory of computer science and to discrete mathematics.

1990
Mark E. Davis

For his pioneering work in catalytic materials, catalysis, and reaction engineering, including the first synthesis of a molecular sieve with pores larger than 1 nanometer and the invention of supported aqueous-phase catalysts; each of these accomplishments opens up a new and potentially important area in catalytic science and technology, and also has implications for separations technology and environmental control.

1989
Richard H. Scheller

For his work leading to the development of recombinant DNA technologies, and for his current research which has illuminated cellular and molecular mechanisms used to regulate animal behavior. These basic studies will lead to a better understanding of the molecular basis of brain function and should, in the future, help in the understanding of major psychiatric illnesses.

1988
Peter Schultz

For innovative research at the interface of chemistry and biology, both in the development of new approaches for the study of molecular recognition and catalysis and in the application of these studies to the design of selective biological catalysts.

1987
Lawrence H. Summers

For outstanding contributions to economic research on unemployment, taxation of capital, savings behavior and macroeconomic activity. His work combines powerful analytic insights and imaginative econometric methods aimed at subjects of fundamental National importance.

1986
Edward Witten

For path-opening contributions to the physics of elementary particles and gravity, to the search unification, and to the imaginative pursuit of the implications for cosmology.

1985
Jacqueline Barton

For her imaginative and significant work in bioinorganic chemistry. Her use of small inorganic molecules to recognize and modify DNA sites in very specific ways has led to two major discoveries—enantiomeric selectivity in binding to DNA helices of different handedness, and Z-DNA "punctuation" at the end of genes—with important implications for drug design and for the theory of gene expression.

1984
Harvey Friedman

For his revitalization of the foundations of mathematics, his penetrating investigations into the Godel incompleteness phenomena, and his fundamental contributions to virtually all areas of mathematical logic.

1983
Corey S. Goodman (de)

For his contributions to our understanding of the development of the nervous system. His imaginative choice of model systems and modern technologies are enabling him to discover how individual nerve cells acquire their unique identities and interact with the appropriate cells during embryogenesis.

1982
Richard Axel

For devising a novel procedure for introducing virtually any gene into mammalian cells. Gene transfer now permits the analysis of the mechanisms regulating the expression of genes in an appropriate cellular environment. This information is prerequisite to a rational approach towards gene therapy.

1981
W. Clark Still

For showing that fundamental conformational principles can be used in organic synthesis to describe nonrigid molecular arrays and for the design of chemical reactions which use such arrays to control the three-dimensional structure of flexible molecules.

1980
Roy Schwitters

For his contributions to the understanding of the basic structure of matter through experiments that discovered and explored an entirely new collection of subatomic particles. The experiments led to the interpretation of the new particles as being composed of simpler constituents, possessing a new property of matter.

1979
William Thurston

In recognition of his achievements in introducing revolutionary new geometrical methods in the theory of foliations, function theory and topology.

1978
Richard A. Muller

For his original and innovative research, which has led to important discoveries and inventions in diverse areas of physics, including astrophysics, radioisotope dating and optics.

1977
J. William Schopf

For his outstanding research on Precambrian biotas. His work on these delicate and ancient fossil microorganisms will contribute significantly to the knowledge of the origin of life and the evolution of the earliest known biotas of the world.

1976
Charles Fefferman

For his research in Fourier analysis, partial differential equations and several complex variables which have brought fresh insight and renewed vigor to classical areas of mathematics and contributed signally to the advancement of modern mathematical analysis.
