= Asian Scientist =

Singaporean English-language magazine

- Editors: Juliana Chan, Ph.D.
- Categories: Science
- Frequency: Weekly (online) and biannual (print)
- Founder: Juliana Chan
- First issue: March 16, 2011; 15 years ago
- Company: Wildtype Media Group Pte Ltd
- Country: Singapore
- Language: English
- Website: www.asianscientist.com
- ISSN: 2345-7333

Asian Scientist is an English language science and technology magazine published in Singapore.

== History and profile ==
Asian Scientist was launched as a blog in March 2011 by Juliana Chan. The blog's popularity eventually led to a partnership with the publishing house World Scientific Publishing, enabling Chan to turn Asian Scientist into a magazine and serve as its editor-in-chief.

Based in Singapore, Asian Scientist is maintained by a team of professional science and medical journalists, with active contributors from the science, technology and medical communities.

The magazine's launch reflects the growing demographic of scientists, engineers and doctors from Asia, and caters to this community with news stories that are both timely and of interest to them. According to the 2010 U.S. National Science Foundation Key Science and Engineering Indicators report, one-quarter of the world's publications are from Asia and one-third of all scientific researchers worldwide are Asian, representing a shift of the world's scientific center of gravity to Asia.

According to the Science and Engineering Indicators 2012 released by the U.S. National Science Board, the largest global science and technology gains in recent years occurred in the "Asia-10″ – China, India, Indonesia, Japan, Malaysia, Philippines, Singapore, South Korea, Taiwan and Thailand. Between 1999 and 2009, for example, the U.S. share of global R&D dropped from 38 to 31 percent, whereas Asia's share grew from 24 to 35 percent during that period.

On April 16, 2013, the company accepted seed funding from international science publisher World Scientific Publishing Company to expand operations at its Singapore headquarters. In January 2014, it launched its flagship print magazine targeted at scientists, healthcare professionals and students. The magazine's inaugural issue focused on the biomedical sciences and was featured by media outlets in Singapore and Malaysia as Asia's first science magazine.

On April 2, 2015, it launched the inaugural Asian Scientist Writing Prize, co-organized with Science Centre Singapore and with prizes sponsored by World Scientific Publishing Company. The competition received close to 400 entries and gave out SGD$21,000 in cash and prizes. The competition returned for its second installment in 2017, this time with Dr. Jorge Cham of Piled Higher and Deeper as its invited guest speaker.

In August 2015, it published a book called Singapore's Scientific Pioneers, with the goal of highlighting the contributions of 25 pioneering scientists from Singapore. The book was made possible by a Singapore50 Celebration Fund grant from the Ministry of Community Development, Youth and Sports.

At the start of 2017, the company launched Supercomputing Asia, a new biannual print title dedicated to tracking the latest developments in high performance computing across the region and making supercomputing accessible to the layman.

On May 4, 2018, the company was relaunched as Wildtype Media Group, a STEM-focused media company spanning digital, print, custom publishing and events. It works with academic and industry media partners in Asia on their communication strategies with key stakeholders and the public.

== Content ==
The magazine covers science, medical and technology news updates from the Asia and Australasia regions. It devotes categories to research and development, health, medicine, new media and education. The site has been indexed by Google News since July 22, 2011.

== Notable coverage ==
The magazine regularly features peer-reviewed basic and applied research from Asia, and carries out one-on-one interviews with notable Asian scientists. Prominent interviewees include:

- Dr. Kōsuke Morita of the RIKEN Nishina Center for Accelerator-Based Science, who discovered element 113 (nihonium), the first-ever element discovered in Asia to be added to the periodic table. Dr. Morita discussed the process and challenges that led up to this scientific achievement, and shared advice to young scientists in Asia.
- Dr. Yongyuth Yuthavong, the deputy prime minister of Thailand. Dr. Yuthavong, who has a PhD in organic chemistry, shared his vision for science in Thailand and the ASEAN region, and the need for scientists to get involved in politics.
- Ms. Kiran Mazumdar-Shaw, who is one of Forbes magazine's 100 most powerful women in the world, and chairman and managing director of Biocon Limited, a billion-dollar Indian biotech company. Ms. Mazumdar-Shaw discussed the challenges to innovation and entrepreneurship that Asia faces.
- 2012 Nobel laureate in Physiology or Medicine, Dr. Shinya Yamanaka, who candidly discussed his early career, what inspires him, and the challenges he faced leading up to the 2012 Nobel Prize.
- Former Beijing Genomics Institute (BGI) Executive Director Dr. Wang Jun, who explained why the kung fu panda best describes the Chinese world leader in human, plant and animal genetics research. In 2016, Dr. Wang gave a second interview as co-founder of Chinese genomics biotech startup iCarbonX.
- Dr. David Ho, CEO of the Aaron Diamond AIDS Research Center, who discussed HIV/AIDS research in China. Dr. Ho previously won the U.S. Presidential Citizen's Medal and was TIME magazine's 1996 Person of the Year.
- Dr. Zhang Feng, inventor of optogenetics and CRISPR gene editing, and youngest core member at the Broad Institute.
- Dr. Sania Nishtar, founder of Pakistan NGO and think-tank, Heartfile, and also Pakistan's first female cardiologist.
- Dr. Shuji Nakamura, winner of the 2006 Millennium Technology Prize and co-recipient of the 2014 Nobel Prize in Physics for inventing efficient blue light-emitting diodes (LEDs).
- Dr. Dennis Lo, inventor of a non-invasive blood test called non-invasive prenatal testing (NIPT), which detects cell-free placental DNA present in maternal blood.
- Ms. Yeo Bee Yin, Malaysia's Minister of Energy, Science, Technology, Environment and Climate Change, on her ministry's efforts to stem the deluge of plastic waste entering Malaysia.

== Asian Scientist 100 ==
On March 30, 2016, Asian Scientist released the inaugural Asian Scientist 100 list. The Asian Scientist 100 list is an annual handpicked selection of 100 prize-winning Asian researchers, academicians, innovators and business leaders from across the Asia-Pacific region. This list of accomplished personalities included Tu Youyou, Kazutoshi Mori, K. Radhakrishnan and Nancy Ip. The list was subsequently mentioned by the Manila Bulletin, Philippine Daily Inquirer, GMA News Online, The Nation, and VietNamNet Bridge.

On May 22, 2019, the Philippine Senate adopted a resolution commending eight Filipino scientists on the Asian Scientist 100 list (2018 edition). The resolution was introduced by Senator Bam Aquino, chair of the Senate committee on science and technology, to congratulate the scientists for "bringing pride and prestige to the country".
