= William Anderegg =

American scientist researching climate change

William R. L. Anderegg is an American scientist and researcher, who has contributed to the fields of climate change and ecology. His research examines the impacts of climate change on Earth’s forests, and includes studies on the scientific consensus on climate change, the physiology of tree and forest drought responses, climate change impacts on pollen seasons, and climate risks to forests and nature-based climate solutions. Anderegg is a professor of biology and former director of the Wilkes Center for Climate Science and Policy at the University of Utah. He won the National Science Foundation's Alan T. Waterman Award in 2023.

== Early life and education ==
Anderegg was born and grew up in Colorado. He received a B.A. and completed a Ph.D. in biology at Stanford University. His dissertation work examined the physiology of how trees die from drought and climate stress through damage to the water transport system and the scientific consensus around climate change. He completed a postdoctoral fellowship at Princeton University.

== Research ==
Anderegg’s research examines how climate change affects forests, ecosystems, and society in the western US and around the world. He has conducted research to quantify the scientific consensus around human-caused climate change, examine how climate stress and drought kill trees through disruption of the water transport system, examine how climate change affects pollen seasons in North America, and quantify climate risks like wildfires to human communities and to forests.

== Awards ==
- Presidential Early Career Award for Scientists and Engineers (2025)
- NSF’s Alan T. Waterman Award (2023)
- Blavatnik National Laureate in Life Sciences (2023)
- David and Lucile Packard Foundation Science and Engineering Fellowship (2018-2023)
- CAREER Award, National Science Foundation (2021-2026)
- Early Career Fellow of the Ecological Society of America (2018-2022)
- Tansley Medal from the New Phytologist Trust (2014)

== Selected publications ==
- Anderegg, W.R.L.; Prall, J. W.; Harold, J.; Schneider, S. H. (2010-04-09). "Expert credibility in climate change". Proceedings of the National Academy of Sciences. 107 (27): 12107–12110. Bibcode:2010PNAS..10712107A. doi:10.1073/pnas.1003187107. PMC 2901439. PMID 20566872.
- Anderegg, W.R.L.; Konings, A.G.; Trugman, A.T.; Yu, K.; Bowling, D.R.; Gabbitas, D.; Karp, D.; Pacala, S.; Sperry, J.S.; Sulman, B.; Zenes, N. (2018). "Hydraulic diversity of forests regulates ecosystem resilience during drought". Nature. 561 (7724): 538–541. Bibcode:2018Natur.561..538A. doi:10.1038/s41586-018-0539-7. PMID 30232452.
- Anderegg, W.R.L.; Abatzoglou, J.; Anderegg, L.D.L.; Bielory, L.; Kinney, P.; Ziska, L. (2021). "Anthropogenic climate change is worsening North American pollen seasons". Proceedings of the National Academy of Sciences. 118 (7) e2013284118. Bibcode:2021PNAS..11813284A. doi:10.1073/pnas.2013284118. PMC 7896283. PMID 33558232.
- Anderegg, W.R.L.; Wu, C.; Acil, N.; Carvalhais, T.A.M.; Pugh, J.P.; Sadler, R.; Seidl, R. (2022). "A climate risk analysis of Earth's forests in the 21st century". Science. 377 (6610): 1099–1103. Bibcode:2022Sci...377.1099A. doi:10.1126/science.abp9723. PMID 36048937.
