= Lara Thompson =

Biomedical engineer

- Education: Massachusetts Institute of Technology
- Awards: Alan T. Waterman Award
- Scientific career
- Workplaces: University of the District of Columbia
- Thesis: A study of the effects of sensory state on rhesus monkey postural control (2013)

Lara A. Thompson is a biomedical engineer at the University of the District of Columbia. She is known for her work in human mobility and was a 2022 recipient of the National Science Foundations Alan T. Waterman Award.

== Biography ==
Thompson went to high school in New Hampshire, has a BS in mechanical engineering from the University of Massachusetts Lowell (2003), and an MS in aeronautical and astronautical engineering from Stanford University (2005). She earned a PhD in biomedical engineering from the Harvard University / Massachusetts Institute of Technology Program in Health Sciences and Technology(2013). Following her PhD she joined the faculty at the University of the District of Columbia and, as of 2022, she is an associate professor in mechanical engineering.

Thompson is known for her work on human mobility in impaired and unimpaired populations. Her PhD work was on Vestibular implants, where she examined the importance of postural control and the impact of invasive vestibular implants on posture. With funding from the National Science Foundation, Thompson established a biomedical engineering lab to assess balance and movement in people.

== Selected publications ==
- Thompson, Lara A.; Haburcakova, Csilla; Gong, Wangsong; Lee, Daniel J.; Wall, Conrad; Merfeld, Daniel M.; Lewis, Richard F. (2012-06-08). "Responses evoked by a vestibular implant providing chronic stimulation1". Journal of Vestibular Research. 22 (1): 11–15. doi:10.3233/VES-2012-0442. PMC 4041130. PMID 22699148.
- Thompson, Lara A.; Badache, Mehdi; Cale, Steven; Behera, Lonika; Zhang, Nian (2017). "Balance Performance as Observed by Center-of-Pressure Parameter Characteristics in Male Soccer Athletes and Non-Athletes". Sports. 5 (4): 86. doi:10.3390/sports5040086. ISSN 2075-4663. PMC 5969037. PMID 29910446.
- Thompson, Lara A.; Haburcakova, Csilla; Lewis, Richard F. (2016). "Vestibular ablation and a semicircular canal prosthesis affect postural stability during head turns". Experimental Brain Research. 234 (11): 3245–3257. doi:10.1007/s00221-016-4722-5. ISSN 0014-4819. PMC 5108089. PMID 27405997.

== Awards and honors ==
In 2019 Thompson was honored at the Black Engineer of the Year Awards as an innovator in STEM at Historically Black Colleges and Universities. In 2022 Thompson received the Alan T. Waterman Award from the United States' National Science Foundation, which included $1 million in prize money to be received over a five year period to continue research in her field.
