= Charles T. Clotfelter =

American economist

Charles T. Clotfelter (born August 20, 1947) is an economist and the Z. Smith Reynolds Professor of Public Policy Studies and Professor of Economics and Law at the Sanford School of Public Policy at Duke University in Durham, North Carolina, where he has taught since 1979. He is also director of the Center for the Study of Philanthropy and Voluntarism at Duke and is a research associate for the National Bureau of Economic Research. His primary research interests include the economics of education, the nonprofit sector, tax policy and public finance.

During his time at Duke, Clotfelter has served as vice provost for academic policy and planning (1983–1985), vice chancellor (1985–1988) and vice provost for academic programs (1993–1994). He also has served as president of the Southern Economic Association and was a visiting scholar at the Russell Sage Foundation for the 2005-06 year. He was ranked among the most influential scholars in the nation's dialogue on education in the 2014 RHSU Edu-Scholar Public Influence List.

Prior to teaching at Duke, Clotfelter taught at the University of Maryland from 1974 to 1979, spending his last year on leave as a Brookings Economic Policy Fellow at the U.S. Treasury Department's Office of Tax Analysis.

Born in Birmingham, Alabama, Clotfelter grew up in Atlanta, Georgia. He graduated summa cum laude from Duke University with a B.A. in 1969. He then studied at Harvard University, receiving an M.A. in 1972 and PhD in economics in 1974.

== Books ==
- Unequal Colleges in the Age of Disparity. 2017. Harvard University Press.
- Big-Time Sports in American Universities. 2011. Cambridge University Press.
- After Brown: The Rise and Retreat of School Desegregation. 2004. Princeton University Press.
- Buying the Best: Cost Escalation in Elite Higher Education. 1996. Princeton University Press.
- Economic Challenges in Higher Education. 1991. University of Chicago Press. (with Ronald G. Ehrenberg, Malcolm Getz, and John J. Siegfried)
- Selling Hope: State Lotteries in America. 1989. Harvard University Press. (with Philip J. Cook).
- Federal Tax Policy and Charitable Giving. 1985. University of Chicago Press.

== Op-Eds ==
- "It's Madness as universities play for pay" Raleigh News and Observer (March 11, 2011). Also published as "March Madness: Universities in the entertainment business" Seattle Times (March 11, 2011), "March Madness: Sports' stranglehold on education" Sun-Sentinel (March 13, 2011) and "The NCAA bracket racket" The Globe and Mail (March 9, 2011).
- "Stop the Tax Deduction for Major College Sports Programs" Washington Post (December 31, 2010).
- "Is Sports in Your Mission Statement?" The Chronicle of Higher Education (October 24, 2010).
- "Hold That Line? For 80 Years, Universities Haven’t” Raleigh News and Observer (October 22, 2009). Also published as "College Athletics under Fire" Pittsburgh Post-Gazette (October 25, 2009) and "80 Years of Trade-Offs in College Sports" Atlanta Journal-Constitution (November 27, 2009).
- "The Death of Desegregation" (with Erwin Chemerinsky) Raleigh News and Observer (July 3, 2007). Also published as "Abandoning the Promise" Baltimore Sun (July 5, 2007).
- "What If The Lottery Were Run For Lottery Players?" (with Philip J. Cook) Raleigh News & Observer (March 1, 2007).
- "Surprising Progress Among Hispanic Students" (with Helen F. Ladd and Jacob Vigdor) Raleigh News and Observer (June 5, 2006). Also published as "Latinos’ School Performance Progressive, Not Stagnant, Study Suggests" Contra Costa Times (June 4, 2006).
- "The Decline of Diversity in Our Schools" Washington Post (May 15, 2004).

== Awards ==
- Co-winner, Gladys M. Kammerer Prize, awarded by the American Political Science Association for the best political science publication in 2004 in the field of U.S. national policy. For "After Brown: The Rise and Retreat of School Desegregation".
- Raymond Vernon Memorial Prize for best article published in Journal of Policy Analysis and Management, 2004. For Clotfelter, Helen Ladd, Jacob Vigdor, and Aliaga Diaz, “Do School Accountability Systems Make it More Difficult for Low Performing Schools to Attract and Retain High Quality Teachers?” Vol. 23 (Spring 2004).
