= Katrina G. Claw =

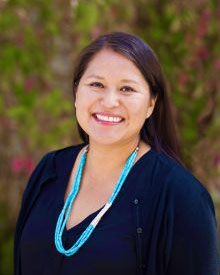
- Claw in 2024
- Occupation: Associate professor

Academic work
- Institutions: University of Colorado Anschutz
- Main interests: Bioinformatics

Katrina G. Claw is an associate professor at the University of Colorado Anschutz whose research focuses on bioinformatics, particularly in the area of personalized medicine.

She was previously a post-doctoral researcher at the University of Washington's School of Pharmacy.

== Awards and honors ==
Claw was one of the recipients of the National Human Genome Research Institute's 2020 Genomic Innovator Awards.

Claw was one of the three recipients of the Alan T. Waterman Award in 2024 for her "contributions to pharmacogenomics and for fostering cultural and bioethical research participation within Indigenous communities."
