= Aaron Dollar =

American mechanical engineer and material scientist

Aaron Dollar is a professor of Mechanical Engineering & Materials Science and Computer Science at Yale University, where he serves as the lead investigator of the GRAB Lab. His research focuses on analysis, design, and control of compliant mechanisms. In 2010, he was recognized as an innovator by being included in the MIT Technology Review's TR35 list.

== Education ==
- Ph.D., Harvard University Engineering Science
- M.S., Harvard University
- B.S., University of Massachusetts at Amherst, Mechanical Engineering
