= Kristin Goss =

American political scientist

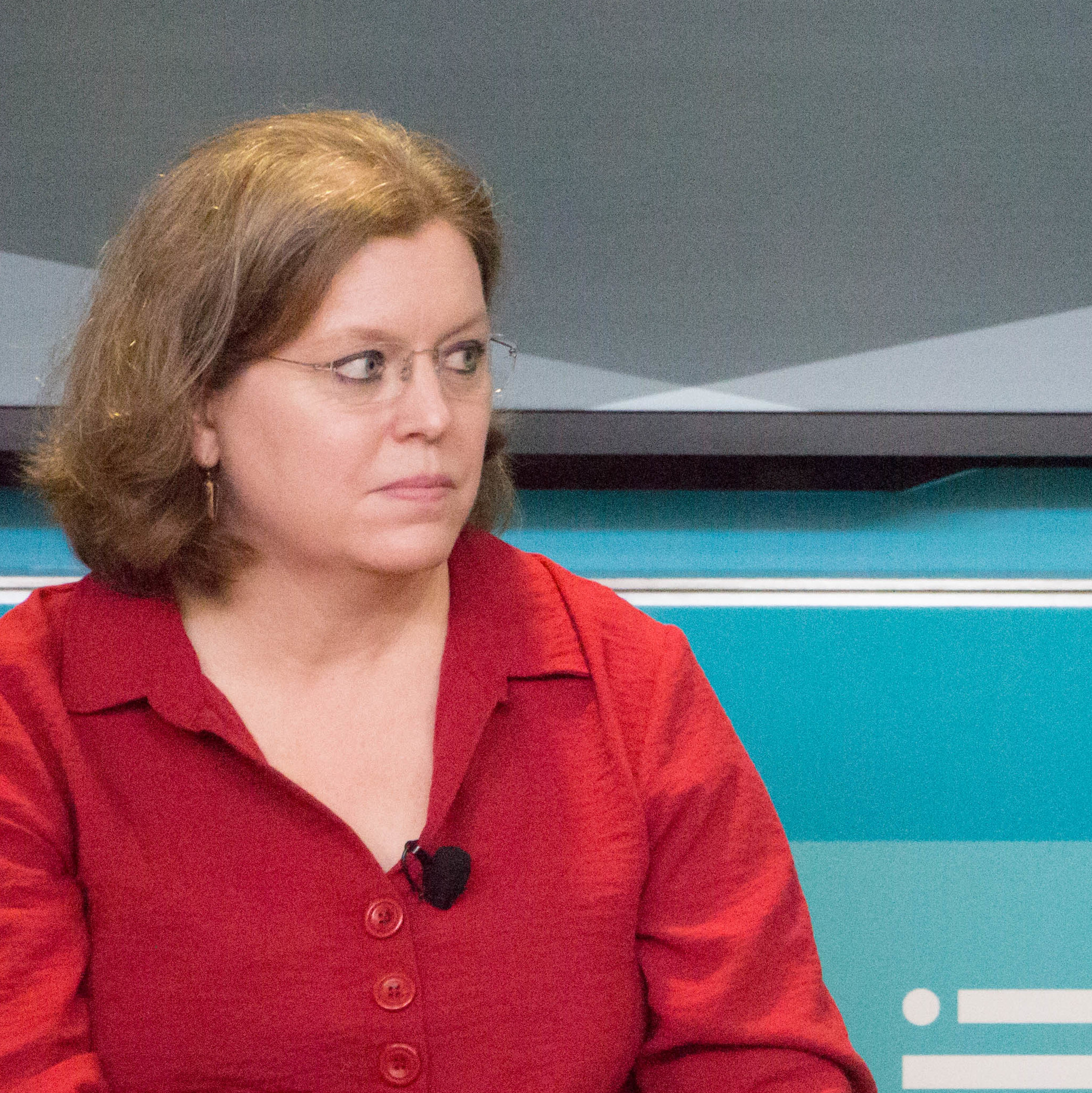
- Goss in 2017
- Born: Denver, Colorado, US
- Education: Harvard University; Duke University
- Awards: Harold D. Lasswell Award, APSA; Bass Society of Fellows, Duke University
- Scientific career
- Fields: Political science
- Workplaces: Georgetown University, Duke University
- Doctoral advisors: Robert D. Putnam, Theda Skocpol, Philip J. Cook, Mark H. Moore

Kristin Anne Goss is an American political scientist. She is the Susan B. King Distinguished Professor of Public Policy and Professor of Political Science in the Sanford School of Public Policy at Duke University. She specializes in the politics of gun control, advocacy by women's organizations, the formation of political movements, philanthropy and public policy, and civic engagement in the United States.

== Early work and education ==
Goss studied Latin American history and literature at Harvard University, graduating with a BA (magna cum laude) in 1987. She then received an MPP degree from Duke University in 1996, before returning to Harvard and earning an AM in government in 1999 and a PhD in government in 2003. Goss's dissertation, Disarmed: The Real American Gun Control Paradox, won the 2003 Harold D. Lasswell Award from the American Political Science Association, which recognizes "the best doctoral dissertation in the field of public policy" every year. From 2003 to 2005 she was a visiting adjunct/assistant professor at Georgetown University, and in 2005 she joined the public policy faculty at Duke University.

== Career ==
Goss started her career as a newspaper reporter on the founding staff of The Chronicle of Philanthropy. In her academic life, Goss has been the author, co-author, co-editor of four books. She was the sole author of Disarmed: The Missing Movement for Gun Control in America, which was first published in 2006 and released in a paperback edition in 2009. The book studies why political movements do or do not form by examining the lack of a movement where one might expect a movement to exist. In this case, she investigated why high levels of gun violence and broad support for gun regulation in America had not translated into a mass mobilization. Harry L. Wilson wrote that Disarmed made a contribution to each of two separate fields: both the theory of social movements and the topic of gun control. Supreme Court Justice John Paul Stevens cited Disarmed in a dissenting opinion on a case related to gun control.

Goss was also the sole author of the 2013 book The Paradox of Gender Equality: How American Women's Groups Gained and Lost Their Public Voice, which was published in a second edition in 2020. The book is based on an original database of testimony before the United States Congress by women's organizations from 1880 to 2000. Certain historical accounts of women's political engagement in the United States argued that this activity has risen and fallen, with crests that coincide with certain notable victories like women's suffrage. Instead, Goss shows that, after suffrage, women's groups became increasingly active and powerful on topics such as health care and foreign affairs, declining after a series of victories in the 1960s and 1970s. HuffPost named The Paradox of Gender Equality one of the best political science books in 2013.

In addition to the four books, Goss has been the author or co-author of many journal articles, book chapters, newspaper articles, and op-eds. She has been on the editorial board of several political science journals, including Politics & Gender and PS: Political Science & Politics. Goss's work has been cited in news outlets including NPR, PolitiFact, The Guardian, and The Christian Science Monitor, and she has published articles on gun control in The Washington Post and CNN.

== Selected works ==
- "Volunteering and the Long Civic Generation". Nonprofit and Voluntary Sector Quarterly (1999)
- Disarmed: The Missing Movement for Gun Control in America (2006)
- The Paradox of Gender Equality: How American Women's Groups Gained and Lost Their Public Voice (2013)
- The Gun Debate: What Everyone Needs to Know (with Philip J. Cook) (2014; 2nd ed. 2020)
- Gun Studies: Interdisciplinary Approaches to Politics, Policy, and Practice (with Jennifer Carlson and Harel Shapira) (2018)

== Selected awards ==
- Harold D. Lasswell Award, American Political Science Association (2003)
- Bass Society of Fellows, Duke University (2017)
