= Jure Leskovec =

Slovene computer scientist

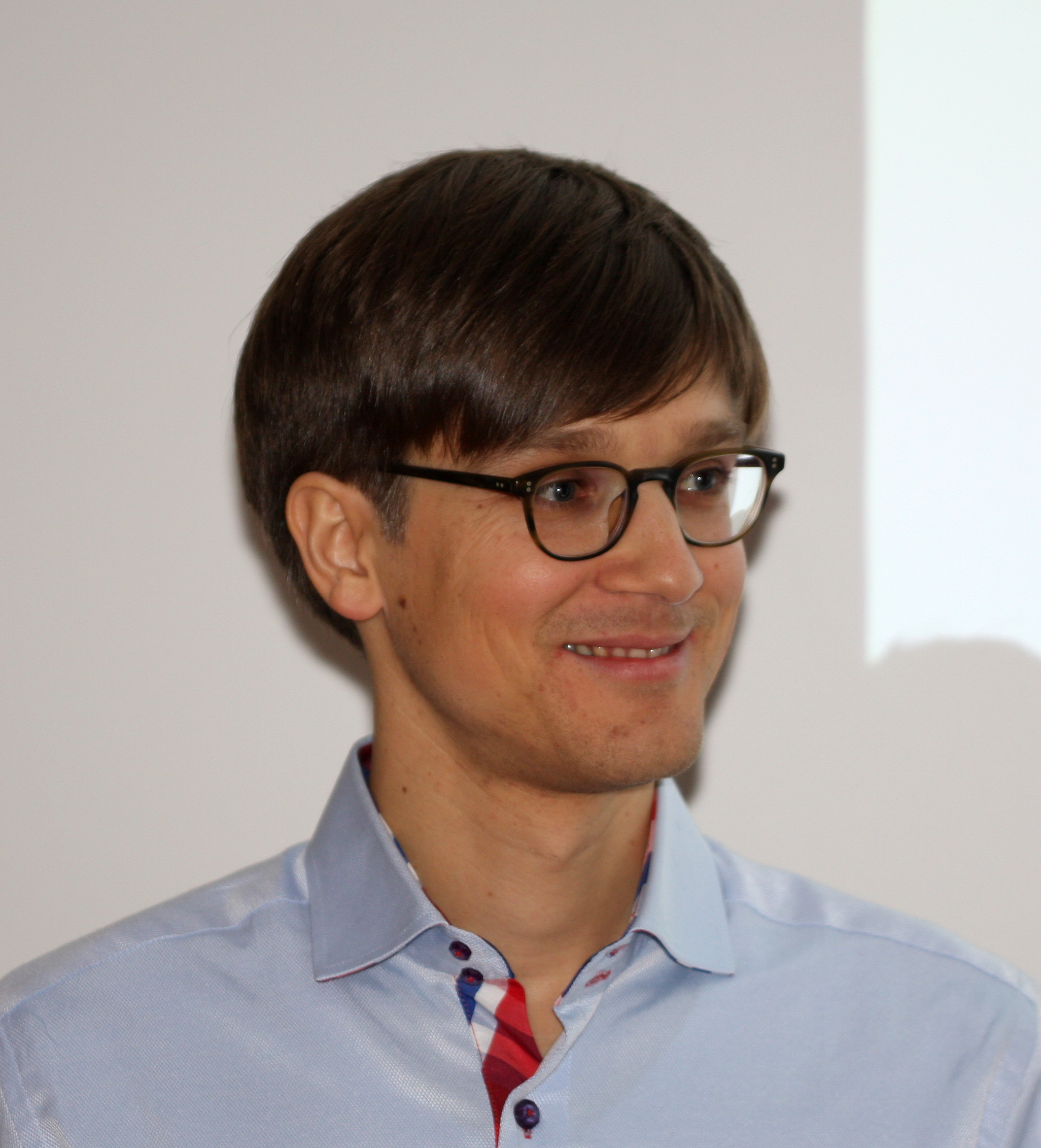
- Born: May 1980 (age 46); Ljubljana, Slovenia
- Education: University of Ljubljana
- Awards: Lagrange Prize; Alfred P. Sloan Fellowship
- Scientific career
- Fields: Computer Science
- Workplaces: Stanford University
- Thesis: Dynamics of Large Networks (2008)
- Doctoral advisor: Christos Faloutsos
- Notable students: Himabindu Lakkaraju; Emma Pierson

Jure Leskovec (born May 1980) is a Slovenian computer scientist, entrepreneur and professor of Computer Science at Stanford University focusing on networks. He was the chief scientist at Pinterest and co-founder / chief scientist AI graph-ML startup Kumo.

== Early life and education ==
Leskovec was born in May 1980 in Ljubljana, Slovenia. In 2004, Leskovec received a Diploma in Computer Science from the University of Ljubljana, Slovenia, researching semantic networks-based creation of abstracts, using machine learning; in 2008 he received a PhD in Computational and Statistical Learning from the Carnegie Mellon University.

After finishing his PhD, Leskovec worked as a postdoctoral fellow at Cornell University for a year. During this time, he was advised by Jon Kleinberg.

== Research and career ==
After his postdoctoral stint at Cornell University, Leskovec joined the faculty of Stanford University as an assistant professor in the Department of Computer Science in 2009. He was promoted to associate professor with tenure in 2016.

His general research area is applied machine learning and data science for large interconnected systems. His work focuses on modeling complex, richly-labeled relational structures, graphs, and networks for systems at all scales, from interactions of proteins in a cell to interactions between humans in a society. His research finds applications in a variety of settings including commonsense reasoning, recommender systems, computational social science, and computational biology with an emphasis on drug discovery.

Leskovec co-founded a startup called Kosei in 2014 that was acquired by Pinterest in 2015.

As of 2025, Leskovec is working on another startup called Kumo AI, which helps Data Scientists ship predictive models faster and more accurately.

== Awards and honors ==
- Microsoft Research Faculty Fellowship, 2011.
- Alfred P. Sloan Fellowship, 2012.
- Lagrange Prize, 2015.
- SIGKDD Innovation Award, 2023.

== Select publications ==
- Jon Kleinberg; Himabindu Lakkaraju; Jure Leskovec; Jens Ludwig; Sendhil Mullainathan (26 August 2017). "Human Decisions and Machine Predictions". The Quarterly Journal of Economics. 133 (1): 237–293. doi:10.1093/qje/qjx032. ISSN 0033-5533. PMC 5947971. PMID 29755141. Zbl 1405.91119. Wikidata Q54963122.
- Aditya Grover; Jure Leskovec (August 2016). "node2vec: Scalable Feature Learning for Networks". Proceedings of the ACM SIGKDD international conference on Knowledge discovery and data mining. 2016: 855–864. arXiv:1607.00653. doi:10.1145/2939672.2939754. ISSN 2154-817X. PMC 5108654. PMID 27853626. Wikidata Q28595865.
- William L. Hamilton; Rex Ying; Jure Leskovec (2017). "Inductive Representation Learning on Large Graphs" (PDF). Advances in Neural Information Processing Systems 30. Advances in Neural Information Processing Systems. arXiv:1706.02216. doi:10.48550/arxiv.1706.02216. Wikidata Q44546984.
