= Erich Jarvis =

American neuroscientist

Erich D. Jarvis
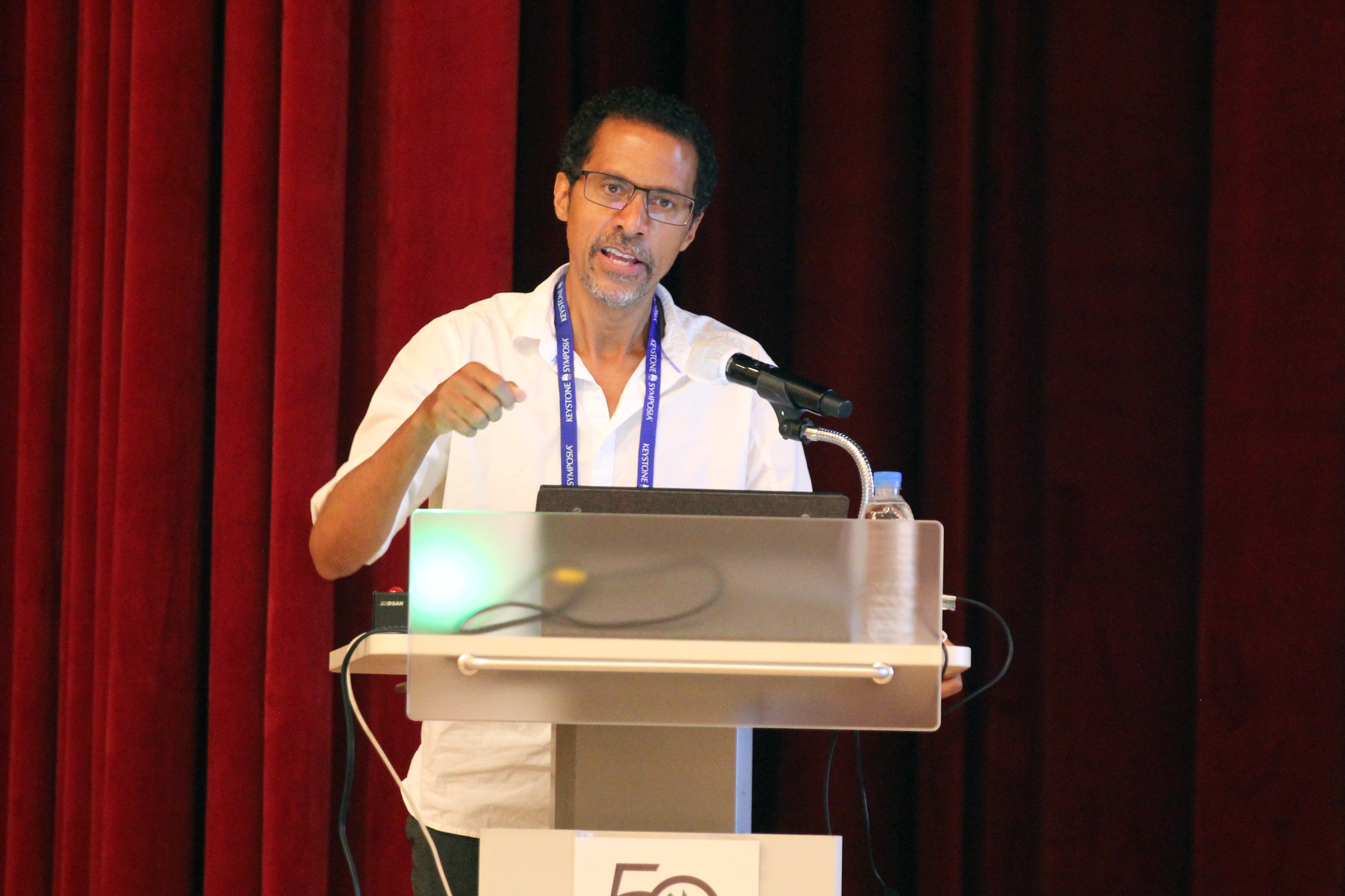
- Born: May 6, 1965; Harlem, New York City, NY, US
- Education: Hunter College; Rockefeller University
- Known for: Birdsong, language
- Scientific career
- Fields: Neuroscience
- Workplaces: Duke University Medical Center; Rockefeller University

Erich Jarvis is an American professor at Rockefeller University. He is the head of a team of researchers who study the neurobiology of vocal learning, a critical behavioral substrate for spoken language. By studying animals including songbirds, parrots, and hummingbirds, his research attempts to show that bird groups have similar learning abilities to humans in the context of sound, such as learning new sounds and then passing on vocal repertoires from one generation to the next. Jarvis focuses on the molecular pathways involved in the perception and production of learned vocalizations, and the development of brain circuits for vocal learning.

In 2002, the National Science Foundation awarded Jarvis the Alan T. Waterman Award. In 2005 he was awarded the National Institutes of Health Director's Pioneer Award providing funding for five years to researchers pursuing innovative approaches to biomedical research. In 2008, Jarvis was selected as Investigator for the Howard Hughes Medical Institute.

== Life and career ==
Erich Jarvis was born in Harlem, New York in 1965. Jarvis was one of four children of Sasha McCall, and James Jarvis, a musician and amateur scientist. Since the age of six, he was primarily raised by his mother, after his parents divorced in 1970. Jarvis credits his family, and primarily his father's mind and enthusiasm for science, for his interest in biology. His father had drug-induced schizophrenia and was homeless, living in various parks, prior to becoming the victim of a fatal shooting in 1989. Jarvis attended the High School for the Performing Arts in Manhattan, where he studied ballet. Jarvis turned down an Alvin Ailey American Dance theater audition to study at Hunter College, where he received a B.A. in Biology and Mathematics in 1988. During his undergraduate years at Hunter, he had six scientific publications. He continued his education at Rockefeller University, earning a Ph.D. in Animal Behavior and Molecular Neurobehavior under Fernando Nottebohm in 1995. He continued his postdoctoral education at Rockefeller University until 1998.

Jarvis became an assistant and an adjunct assistant professor at Rockefeller University from 1995 to 2002. He then was an associate professor of neurobiology at Duke University Medical Center until December 2016, when he returned to Rockefeller University, where he is professor and head of the Laboratory of Neurogenetics of Language. He is also the director of the Vertebrate Genome Lab.

The focus of Jarvis' research is the vocal learning capabilities in birds and how they learn to mimic sounds. His research with songbirds is being used to show the evolution of human language capacity and speech disorders. His research combines behavioral, anatomical, electrophysiological, molecular biological, and genomic techniques. The discoveries of Jarvis and his collaborators include the first findings of natural behaviorally regulated gene expression in the avian brain, social context dependent gene regulation, convergent vocal learning systems across distantly related animal groups, the FOXP2 gene in vocal learning birds, and the finding that vocal learning systems may have evolved out of ancient motor learning systems.

His research identifies the neurological basis of birdsong at the tissue, cellular and genetic levels. A recent project seeks to transform birds without songs such as pigeons into birds that sing by genetic neuro-engineering, e.g. injecting new genes into the forebrain. If successful, this could have implications for treating patients with loss of speech after stroke.

== Awards and honors ==
- 1986 First Place Award for Excellence in Biomedical Research, NIH-MBRS Annual Symposium
- 1988 MARC-NIGMS Pre-doctoral National Research Service Award
- 1988 FORD Foundation Pre-Doctoral Fellowship
- 2000 Esther & Joseph Klingenstein Award in Neuroscience
- 2000 Whitehall Foundation Award in Neuroscience
- 2000 David and Lucille Packard Foundation Award
- 2001 Duke University Provost Bioinformatic Award
- 2002 Duke University Provost Computational Biology Award
- 2002 Hall of Fame: Alumni Association of Hunter College
- 2002 Human Frontiers in Science Program Young Investigators Award
- 2002 NSF Alan T. Waterman Award. NSF's highest award for young investigators given annually to one scientist or engineer who under the age of 35 made a significant discovery/impact in science. Awarded for molecular approach and findings to map brain areas involved in behavior.
- 2003 The 2003 Distinguished Alumni Award of the City University of New York.
- 2005 Dominion Award: Strong Men and Women of Excellence: African American Leaders. Prior awardees include Arthur Ashe, Maya Angelou, Oprah Winfrey, and Michael Jordan.
- 2005 NIH Director's Pioneer Award
- 2006 Discover magazine top 100 science discoveries of 2005; avian brain nomenclature listed at #51
- 2006 Diverse magazine's top 10 emerging scholars of 2006
- 2006 Popular Science Magazine: Named in Fifth Annual Brilliant Ten
- 2008 HHMI Investigator Award
- 2014 Summit Award with NSF and NINDS from the American Society of Association Executives for successes of the Society for Neuroscience's Scholars Program
- 2015 Ernest Everett Just Award, American Society for Cell Biology
