= Ahmad Nabeel =

Kuwaiti Scientist

- Born: Kuwait
- Education: Imperial College London
- Occupations: Entrepreneur; Physician; Scientist

Ahmad Nabeel is a Kuwaiti physician, scientist, and entrepreneur.

== Biography ==
=== Early life and education ===
Ahmad Nabeel was born in Kuwait. He received his early education from a government program known as The Enrichment Program for Gifted Students. He received a scholarship to study medicine in Ireland. He eventually finished his Bachelor of Medicine, Bachelor of Surgery (MBBCh) degree in Cairo. After completing his medical studies in Cairo in 2015, he spent three years at Al-Amiri Hospital, having secured a place in a joint training program between the Royal College of Surgeons in Ireland and Kuwait. Later, he attended Imperial College London and earned a master's degree in surgical innovations. He also holds a postgraduate diploma in obesity medicine and metabolic surgery. He is currently doing his PhD at Imperial in surgery and cancer.

=== Career ===
Nabeel invented and developed an automated lens-cleaning technology for laparoscopic and robotic surgery called Klens while working as a junior doctor in Kuwait. The device cleanses the laparoscope lens within 0.4 to 0.8 seconds, eliminating the need to retract and clean the camera manually. Klens has the potential to improve approximately 15 million surgeries annually.

In 2017, Nabeel reached the final rounds on Stars of Science's Season 9, presenting his invention, Klens, to the public. He ended up winning 2nd place during that season. Since then, he has been invited back to the show as a guest judge multiple times.

In 2018, Nabeel joined the inaugural Arab Innovation Academy, a startup event by Qatar Science & Technology Park and the European Innovation Academy. Leading a team, he developed "GoGather", an event organization app, achieving second place. In the same year, Nabeel was honored with a Young Innovator Award at the World Innovation Summit for Health for his Laparoscope. Additionally, he has been the recipient of the Best Innovation Award from the International Federation of Inventors’ Association in Geneva and the Kuwait Award for Innovation.

In October 2019, Nabeel received recognition as an Innovator Under 35 by MIT Technology Review for his work on Klens technology. Later in the same year, he was appointed as the ambassador for Kuwait Vision 2035.

In 2021, Nabeel developed HealthPass, a contact-tracing software for Kuwait, utilizing AI and real-time epidemiological analysis to predict COVID-19 transmission trends. Previously, he had developed an app named Wain Darby that aggregated data from users to provide live traffic updates and assist with user-guided travel planning.

Nabeel's achievements have been included into the Arabic language curriculum in all of Kuwait's schools. He is now based in London where he works as a physician and researcher at St Mary's Hospital with IGHI Co-Director Professor Lord Ara Darzi and Clinical Lecturer in Surgery Hutan Ashrafian at Imperial College London. His work is focused on translational medicine, bariatric surgery, and the applications of artificial intelligence in healthcare.

In 2023, Nabeel delivered a TED talk titled "Does Social Media Really Represent Public Opinion?" where he presented his app, Rayna, at the TEDinArabic Summit 2023. Rayna is a social media platform designed to accurately measure public opinion.

== Awards and recognition ==
- Innovators Under 35 by MIT Technology Review (2019)
- HH the Emir of Kuwait Sheikh Sabah Al-Ahmad Al-Sabah's Youth Excellence Award in Health
- Young Innovator Award from the World Innovation Summit for Health (WISH)
- Stars of Science Award
- Arab Innovation Academy Award
- International Federation of Inventors' Associations (IFIA) Best Invention Award
