= Kristina Olson =

American psychologist

- Education: Washington University in St. Louis; Harvard University
- Occupations: psychologist and professor
- Employer(s): Yale University; University of Washington; Princeton University
- Awards: MacArthur Fellowship (2018), NSF Waterman Award (2018), APS Janet Taylor Spence Award (2016)

Kristina Reiss Olson is a psychologist and a professor at Princeton University. She is known for her research on the development of social categories, transgender youth, and variation in human gender development. Olson was recipient of the 2016 Janet Taylor Spence Award from the Association for Psychological Science for transformative early career contributions, and the 2014 SAGE Young Scholars Award. Olson received the Alan T. Waterman Award from the National Science Foundation in 2018, and was the first psychological scientist to receive this prestigious award honoring early-career scientists. Olson is a member of the 2018 cohort of MacArthur fellows.

== Biography ==
Kristina Olson received her B.A. in Psychology and African and African-American Studies from Washington University in St. Louis in 2003. She completed her PhD from Harvard University in 2008, where she worked with Elizabeth Spelke, Mahzarin Banaji, and Carol S. Dweck. After graduating from Harvard, Olson joined the faculty of Yale University. In 2013, she subsequently moved to the Department of Psychology at the University of Washington where she directs the Social Cognitive Development Lab. Olson's research has been funded through the National Science Foundation, the National Institutes of Health, and the Arcus Foundation. In 2020, Olson joined Princeton University to lead the Human Diversity Lab as a professor in the department of Psychology.

== TransYouth Project ==
Olson directs The TransYouth Project, which is the largest-to-date longitudinal research study of transgender children, with over 300 children enrolled from across the United States and Canada. The children in the study group underwent social transition between the ages of 3 and 12, with an average of 6.5 years old. The TransYouth Project "aims to help scientists, educators, parents, and children better understand the varieties of human gender development." Recent findings from this project indicate that transgender children are not confused, delayed, pretending, or oppositional with regards to their gender identity. On tasks, such as the Implicit Association Test (IAT), which measure social knowledge, attitudes, and stereotypes about gender, transgender children respond similarly to "typical" cisgender children who match their gender identity (i.e., their expressed gender). Such findings suggest that the gender identity of transgender children is stable and deeply held.

In research examining mental health outcomes, Olson and colleagues have observed typical rates of depression and only marginally elevated rates of anxiety in transgender children when compared to control groups of children. Such findings contrast with reports of poor mental health outcomes among transgender adults, who frequently experience discrimination and marginalization. In interviews, Olson has emphasized the importance of supportive parents and families in helping transgender youth feel accepted, safe, and secure, especially as they transition through adolescence to adulthood.

== Representative publications ==
- Olson, Kristina R.; Banaji, Mahzarin R.; Dweck, Carol S.; Spelke, Elizabeth S. (2006). "Children's Biased Evaluations of Lucky Versus Unlucky People and Their Social Groups". Psychological Science. 17 (10). SAGE Publications: 845–846. doi:10.1111/j.1467-9280.2006.01792.x. ISSN 0956-7976. PMID 17100783. S2CID 10976727.
- Olson, Kristina R.; Dweck, Carol S. (2008). "A Blueprint for Social Cognitive Development". Perspectives on Psychological Science. 3 (3). SAGE Publications: 193–202. doi:10.1111/j.1745-6924.2008.00074.x. ISSN 1745-6916. PMID 26158935. S2CID 13107146.
- Olson, Kristina R.; Durwood, Lily; DeMeules, Madeleine; McLaughlin, Katie A. (1 March 2016). "Mental Health of Transgender Children Who Are Supported in Their Identities". Pediatrics. 137 (3). American Academy of Pediatrics (AAP): e20153223. doi:10.1542/peds.2015-3223. ISSN 0031-4005. PMC 4771131. PMID 26921285.
- Olson, Kristina R.; Spelke, Elizabeth S. (2008). "Foundations of cooperation in young children". Cognition. 108 (1). Elsevier BV: 222–231. doi:10.1016/j.cognition.2007.12.003. ISSN 0010-0277. PMC 2481508. PMID 18226808.
- Newheiser, Anna-Kaisa; Olson, Kristina R. (2012). "White and Black American children's implicit intergroup bias". Journal of Experimental Social Psychology. 48 (1). Elsevier BV: 264–270. doi:10.1016/j.jesp.2011.08.011. ISSN 0022-1031. PMC 3241011. PMID 22184478.
