= Philip J. Cook =

American economist and criminologist

- Born: Philip Jackson Cook; October 15, 1946 (age 80); Buffalo, New York U.S.
- Education: University of California at Berkeley (Ph.D., 1973)
- Known for: Research on the economics of gun violence, alcohol abuse, and other subjects
- Awards: Member of the Institute of Medicine since 2001, honorary fellow of the American Society of Criminology
- Scientific career
- Fields: Economics, criminology
- Workplaces: Sanford School of Public Policy at Duke University
- Doctoral advisor: Daniel McFadden
- Doctoral students: Jens Ludwig (economist)

Philip Jackson Cook (born October 15, 1946) is an American economist. He is Terry Sanford Professor Emeritus of Public Policy and Professor Emeritus of Economics at Duke University. He is best known for his research on the economics of crime, particularly gun violence, and for The Winner-Take-All Society, his 1995 book with Robert H. Frank, which remains his most cited work and the only one of his books to reach a wide general readership. His other major research areas include health and safety regulation, including alcohol taxation and the societal costs of drinking; the economics of state lotteries; and income distribution.

== Education and career ==
Cook received a bachelor's degree from the University of Michigan in 1968 and a Ph.D. in economics from the University of California, Berkeley in 1973. While a graduate student at Berkeley, he found a proof of the Slutsky equation considerably shorter than the standard derivation then in use, and published it as a short note in The American Economic Review in 1972, his first academic publication.

Cook joined the Duke faculty as an assistant professor in 1973, shortly after the founding of the university's Sanford Institute of Public Policy, which he later led as director, first from 1985 to 1989 and again from 1997 to 1999. Since 2017 he has held the titles of Terry Sanford Professor Emeritus of Public Policy and Professor Emeritus of Economics at Duke.

== Research ==
Cook's scholarship applies the tools of economic analysis to crime, violence, and other social harms that are more commonly left to sociologists and criminologists. Across four decades he has turned that lens on firearms markets, alcohol consumption, gambling, policing, education and, in his best-known departure from criminology, the structure of reward itself. Duke describes his principal research focus as the economics of crime, but his influence extends well past it.

=== Economics of crime ===
A central strand of Cook's scholarship concerns the economic logic of criminal opportunity: how the availability and cost of weapons, alcohol, policing, and other circumstantial factors shift the likelihood and severity of crime. He has also examined the part played by private actors in prevention, including business improvement districts and other market-driven responses to disorder.

His longest-running intellectual partnership has been with the economist Jens Ludwig, with whom he has published more than 40 papers on crime prevention, firearms, policing, juvenile offending, and prisoner reentry. Duke has called Ludwig his most frequent collaborator, a partnership that has shaped much of the empirical literature on urban violence over the past two decades.

His books Controlling Crime: Strategies and Tradeoffs and Lessons from the Economics of Crime: What Reduces Offending? survey the evidence behind competing approaches to crime control, weighing what has actually been shown to reduce offending against what merely sounds as though it should.

=== Gun violence and firearms ===
Few subjects have occupied Cook longer, or more centrally, than firearms. His research has traced the relationship between gun availability and violent crime, priced the social and economic costs of firearm injury, and mapped the illegal markets through which weapons move from lawful commerce into criminal hands.

His 2000 book with Ludwig, Gun Violence: The Real Costs, built an economic framework for pricing gun violence that went well beyond medical bills and lost wages, incorporating the costs Americans absorb simply living with the risk of it: money spent avoiding danger, insurance against it, and the willingness to pay for a safer alternative that never has to be used.

Later work extended this into the private-sale market for firearms, the paths by which legally purchased guns end up in criminal use, firearm theft, and how a weapon's own characteristics shape the severity of the injuries it causes. A parallel strand has examined the role of police investigative work in solving and deterring shootings.

His most recent book, Policing Gun Violence: Strategic Reforms for Controlling Our Most Pressing Crime Problem (2023), with Anthony Braga, examines how police departments investigate and, ideally, prevent gun violence before it recurs.

As of 2026, his ongoing work at Duke includes research into illegal firearms transactions, tracing how guns move through informal markets and where those pathways intersect with criminal misuse.

=== Alcohol policy ===
Cook's second sustained research program concerns the economics of alcohol control: taxation, availability, drinking-age law, and the relationship between consumption and crime, injury, and mortality. In a 1982 paper with George Tauchen, written when the case for alcohol taxes was politically unfashionable, Cook used differences in state tax rates as a natural experiment and showed that higher liquor taxes were followed by less heavy drinking and fewer deaths from liver cirrhosis.

With Michael J. Moore, he later examined how beer taxes affect youthful drinking, and separately studied the link between alcohol taxation and fatal automobile crashes.

This body of work culminated in Paying the Tab: The Costs and Benefits of Alcohol Control (Princeton University Press, 2007; paperback, 2016), which argues that American legislators have persistently neglected supply-side tools, chiefly higher excise taxes, in favor of politically easier but less effective measures.

=== Lotteries and gambling ===
With Charles Clotfelter, Cook co-authored Selling Hope: State Lotteries in America (1989), an economic dissection of how state lottery systems are designed, marketed, and consumed. Later research extended this into consumer demand for lottery products and the fiscal logic of state-sponsored gambling, work that was subsequently drawn on in the deliberations of the National Gambling Impact Study Commission.

=== Public safety, policing and criminal justice ===
Cook has served on National Academies panels addressing school shootings, juvenile justice, the deterrent effect of capital punishment, underage drinking, and proactive policing, and as vice chair of the National Research Council's Committee on Law and Justice.

His policing research has examined how technology reshapes investigation, including a study of Chicago's Area Technology Centers, built to give investigators fast access to video evidence in shooting cases. A related line of work has looked at prisoner reentry, including an experimental evaluation of an employment-focused reentry program, and interventions aimed at disadvantaged youth before they enter the criminal justice system at all.

=== Education and youth policy ===
Cook's interest in social outcomes extends into education: school starting age, academic performance, truancy, and their relationship to juvenile delinquency. A later research strand has asked whether childhood exposure to environmental lead, including from private well water, leaves a measurable trace in academic and behavioral outcomes years afterward. This work included a Department of Education-funded Truancy Prevention Project running from 2012 to 2016.

== The Winner-Take-All Society ==
Cook's most cited work, and the only one of his books to reach an audience well beyond academic economics, is The Winner-Take-All Society: Why the Few at the Top Get So Much More Than the Rest of Us (1995), written with Robert H. Frank.

Frank and Cook's central argument is that a compensation structure once confined to sports and entertainment, where a tiny margin of talent separates the champion who takes almost everything from the runner-up who takes almost nothing, had begun colonizing law, finance, corporate management, publishing, and much of the rest of the economy. As returns to being merely very good collapse relative to the returns for being the best, the book contends, an increasing share of national income concentrates in the hands of a small number of "superstars" in every field, not because their output has grown a thousand times more valuable, but because markets have grown large enough, and communication cheap enough, for a slight edge to be amplified into an outsized fortune. The authors go further, warning that the pull of these markets can misallocate talent itself, drawing more capable people than any field actually needs into a handful of glamorous, winner-take-all professions, on the strength of the same overconfidence that keeps casinos and lottery counters in business.

The book was reviewed in The New York Times within weeks of its release, and its title supplied the vocabulary that much of the subsequent debate over rising inequality would borrow. "Winner-take-all" has since become one of the more durable shorthand terms in American economic and political commentary, invoked well outside the fields Frank and Cook originally studied.

That vocabulary surfaced in national politics within weeks of the book's publication. Addressing a Democratic Party dinner in Iowa on October 20, 1995, President Bill Clinton framed the choice facing the country in nearly identical terms, asking whether America would be "a society in which everybody has a chance to win, or become a winner-take-all country." Clinton would return to the phrase repeatedly over the following two decades, and the same framing has since recurred across the political spectrum whenever the subject turns to inequality and opportunity.

== National research and government service ==
Cook has consulted for the U.S. Department of Justice's Criminal Division and the U.S. Department of the Treasury's Enforcement Division, and has served on National Academies studies addressing alcohol-abuse prevention, violence, school shootings, underage drinking, capital punishment, and policing.

Taken together, his research sits at the intersection of economics, criminology, public policy, and public health, united by a consistent method: applying empirical and economic reasoning to problems most often treated as purely moral or purely criminological, and letting the data settle disputes that rhetoric alone tends only to inflame.

== Awards and honors ==
Cook was elected to the National Academy of Medicine in 2001, when it was still known as the Institute of Medicine. In 2008 he received the Raymond Vernon Memorial Prize for the year's best article in the Journal of Public Administration Research and Theory, together with the Richard A. Stubbing Teacher Mentor Award from the Sanford Institute of Public Policy.

He was elected a Fellow of the Academy of Experimental Criminology in 2012, in recognition of his contributions to rigorous, quantitative criminology.

In 2020, Cook and criminologist Franklin E. Zimring received the Stockholm Prize in Criminology, the field's most prestigious international award, for their research on gun violence and its prevention; the prize was formally presented in Stockholm in June 2021, honoring work spanning the consequences of gun violence, firearm access among offenders, and strategies for both preventing and investigating shootings.

== Selected works ==
- 2023, with Anthony Braga: Policing Gun Violence: Strategic Reforms for Controlling Our Most Pressing Crime Problem. ISBN 9780199929283
- 2014, 2020 (2nd edition), with Kristin A. Goss: The Gun Debate: What Everyone Needs to Know. ISBN 9780199338993, ISBN 9780190073466
- 2007: Paying the Tab: The Economics of Alcohol Policy. ISBN 9780691125206
- 2002, with Jens Ludwig: Gun Violence: The Real Costs. ISBN 9780195153842
- 1996, with Robert H. Frank: The Winner-Take-All Society. ISBN 9780140259957
- 1989, 1991 (paperback), with Charles T. Clotfelter: Selling Hope: State Lotteries in America. ISBN 0674800982, ISBN 978-0674800984
