= Robert H. Frank =

American professor (born 1945)

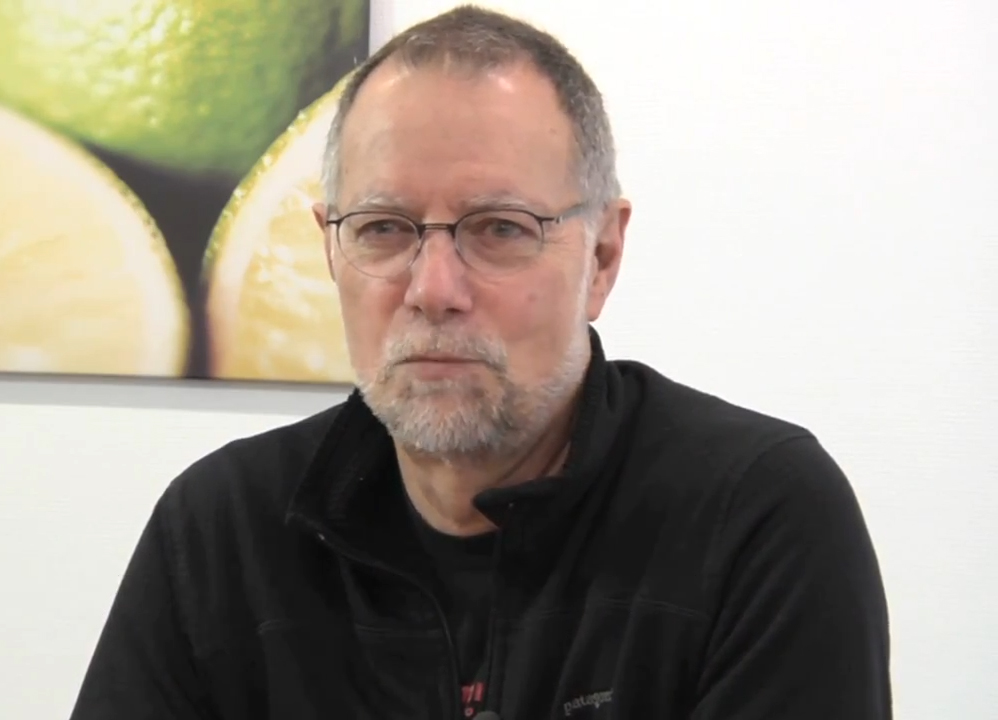
- Frank in 2013
- Born: 2 January 1945 (age 81); Coral Gables, Florida, U.S.
- Occupation: Economist
- Awards: Leontief Prize; 2004

Academic background
- Education: Georgia Institute of Technology; University of California, Berkeley

Academic work
- Institutions: Cornell University
- Website: Official website

Robert Harris Frank (born January 2, 1945) is the Henrietta Johnson Louis Professor of Management Emeritus and a professor of economics at the Cornell Johnson Graduate School of Management at Cornell University. He contributes to the "Economic View" column, which appears every fifth Sunday in The New York Times. Frank has published on the topic of wealth inequality in the United States.

== Early life and education ==
Born in Coral Gables, Florida, in 1945. Frank graduated from Coral Gables Senior High School in 1962. Frank received a B.S. in mathematics from the Georgia Institute of Technology in 1966, M.A. in statistics from the University of California, Berkeley in 1971, and Ph.D. in economics from UC Berkeley in 1972.

== Career ==
Until 2001, he was the Goldwin Smith Professor of Economics, Ethics, and Public Policy in the Cornell University College of Arts and Sciences. For the 2008–09 academic year, Frank was a visiting professor at the New York University Stern School of Business.

Frank has also been a Peace Corps volunteer in rural Nepal, the chief economist for the Civil Aeronautics Board, a fellow at the Center for Advanced Study in the Behavioral Sciences (1992 to 1993), and a professor of American Civilization at École des hautes études en sciences sociales in Paris (2000–01).

In 2008, Frank received an honorary doctorate in economics from the University of St. Gallen

== Notable theories ==
=== Positional arms race ===
This theory is an analytical examination of the socioeconomic concept of keeping up with the Joneses and conspicuous consumption. His book Choosing the Right Pond discusses the importance of status, and how much people pay for status. Frank argues that the race for status is bad for society as a whole, as there cannot be improvement in overall status available, because every time person A rises above person B, the sum of their status remains the same. The only thing that changes is which person is where in the hierarchy.

He reasons that this race for status explains partly why increases in wealth do not increase well-being, or do not increase it much. According to Frank, if most earnings are spent on pursuing status, there will not be much improvement in intrinsic quality of life.

=== Winner take all ===
In their book The Winner-Take-All Society, Frank and Philip J. Cook discuss the contemporary trend toward concentration of wealth. They argue that more and more of the current economy and other institutions are moving toward a state where very few winners take very much, while the rest are left with little. They attributes this, in part, to the modern structure of markets and technology.

=== The strategic role of emotions ===
In various economic papers and in the book Passions Within Reason, he discusses the idea that emotions have important roles in decision making and personal interactions, even when they seem to be irrational. For example, the emotions of love give more value to long term romantic commitment. A "rational" person would dump his partner as soon as he found a better partnership. Emotional attachment gives more long term meaning to the relationship. Put poetically: "Those sensible about love are incapable of it." Similarly, anger can be used as a precommitment device. Frank states that envy can be useful in that it enforces more fair distributions. By acting "irrationally" when treated unfairly, a person can obtain better results in situations which resemble the ultimatum game if their opponent anticipates their emotional response and adjusts their strategy accordingly.

=== Prisoner's dilemma and cooperation ===
Frank, Gilovich, and Regan (1993) conducted an experimental study of the prisoner's dilemma. The subjects were students in their first and final years of undergraduate economics, and undergraduates in other disciplines. Subjects were paired, placed in a typical game scenario, then asked to choose either to "cooperate" or to "defect". Pairs of subjects were told that if they both chose "defect" the payoff for each would be 1. If both cooperated, the payoff for each would be 2. If one defected and the other cooperated, the payoff would be 3 for the defector and 0 for the cooperator. Each subject in a pair made his choice without knowing what the other member of the pair chose.

First year economics students, and students doing disciplines other than economics, overwhelmingly chose to cooperate. But 4th year students in economics tended to not cooperate. Frank et al. concluded, that with "an eye toward both the social good and the well-being of their own students, economists may wish to stress a broader view of human motivation in their teaching."

=== Negative effects of studying economics ===
In a highly cited work, Frank showed that the study of economics reduces cooperation in games. The idea is that much of the time cooperation and consideration of other's perspective are irrational in the narrow sense of the word. Thus, learning that cooperation is irrational in some situations is influencing the behavior of the students towards less cooperation, presumably to the negative.

== Publications ==
=== Books ===
- Choosing the Right Pond: Human Behavior and the Quest for Status. New York: Oxford University Press 1985
- Passions Within Reason: The Strategic Role of Emotions. New York: W.W. Norton 1988
- with Philip J. Cook: The Winner-Take-All Society: Why the Few at the Top Get So Much More Than the Rest of Us. New York: Martin Kessler Books at The Free Press (1995) ISBN 0-14-025995-3
- Luxury Fever: Money and Happiness in an Era of Excess. Princeton: Princeton University Press (2000)
- What Price the Moral High Ground? Ethical Dilemmas in Competitive Environments. Princeton: Princeton University Press (2004)
- with Ben Bernanke: Principles of Economics. New York: McGraw-Hill (2003) ISBN 0-07-121459-3
- with Ben Bernanke: Principles of Macroeconomics. New York: McGraw-Hill (2006) ISBN 0-07-319397-6
- The Economic Naturalist: In Search of Solutions to Everyday Enigmas. New York: Basic Books (2007) ISBN 978-0465002177
- Falling Behind: How Rising Inequality Harms the Middle Class. Berkeley: University of California Press (2007)
- The Return of the Economic Naturalist. How Economics Helps Make Sense of Your World. London: Virgin Books (2009) ISBN 978-0-7535-1966-0
- The Darwin Economy: Liberty, Competition, and the Common Good. Princeton: Princeton University Press (2011) ISBN 0-691-15319-1
- Success and Luck: Good Fortune and the Myth of Meritocracy. Princeton: Princeton University Press (2016) ISBN 9780691167404
- Microeconomics and Behavior. 10th ed. New York: McGraw-Hill (2017) ISBN 978-1259394034
- Under the Influence: Putting Peer Pressure to Work. Princeton: Princeton University Press (2020) ISBN 978-0691193083

=== Articles ===
- Robert Frank, Thomas Gilovich & Dennis Regan: Does Studying Economics Inhibit Cooperation? in: Journal of Economic Perspectives. Volume 7, Number 2. Spring 1993. pp. 159–71 (PDF; 788 KB)
