= Rebecca Kramer-Bottiglio =

American engineer

- Born: Rebecca Krone Kramer
- Education: Harvard University
- Scientific career
- Thesis: Soft Active Materials for Actuation, Sensing, and Electronics (2012)

Rebecca Kramer-Bottiglio is an engineer and professor at Princeton University who is known for her work on robotics. She received the Alan T. Waterman Award in 2024.

== Education and career ==
Kramer-Bottiglio received her B.S. from Johns Hopkins University in 2007. In 2008 she received an M.S. from the University of California, Berkeley. She earned a Ph.D. from Harvard University in 2012. After Harvard University she moved to Purdue University as an assistant professor before moving to Yale University in 2017. In 2019 Kramer-Bottiglio was named the John J. Lee Professor of Engineering at Yale University. As of July 2026 she is a professor at Princeton University in the department of mechanical and aerospace engineering.

== Research ==
Kramer-Bottiglio is known for her work on robotics, specifically focusing on robots that change their structure depending on the task needed. She led the development of a robot that is able to move in the water and on land. She has also worked on robots that can remove portions of their structure, if needed.

== Awards and honors ==
Kramer-Bottiglio received a PECASE award in 2019. In 2024 Kramer-Bottiglio received the Alan T. Waterman Award from the United States' National Science Foundation.

== Selected publications ==
- Kramer, Rebecca K.; Boley, J. William; Stone, Howard A.; Weaver, James C.; Wood, Robert J. (2014-01-21). "Effect of Microtextured Surface Topography on the Wetting Behavior of Eutectic Gallium–Indium Alloys". Langmuir. 30 (2): 533–539. doi:10.1021/la404356r. ISSN 0743-7463.
- Kramer, Rebecca K.; Majidi, Carmel; Wood, Robert J. (2013-11-13). "Masked Deposition of Gallium‐Indium Alloys for Liquid‐Embedded Elastomer Conductors". Advanced Functional Materials. 23 (42): 5292–5296. doi:10.1002/adfm.201203589. ISSN 1616-301X.
- Shih, Benjamin; Shah, Dylan; Li, Jinxing; Thuruthel, Thomas G.; Park, Yong-Lae; Iida, Fumiya; Bao, Zhenan; Kramer-Bottiglio, Rebecca; Tolley, Michael T. (2020-04-15). "Electronic skins and machine learning for intelligent soft robots". Science Robotics. 5 (41). doi:10.1126/scirobotics.aaz9239. hdl:11382/575157. ISSN 2470-9476.
- Woodman, Stephanie J.; Kramer-Bottiglio, Rebecca (2025-05-05). "Stretchable Shape Sensing and Computation for General Shape-Changing Robots". Annual Review of Control, Robotics, and Autonomous Systems. 8 (1): 1–23. doi:10.1146/annurev-control-030123-013355. ISSN 2573-5144.
