= Muyinatu Bell =

Professor of Biomedical Engineering

Muyinatu A. Lediju Bell
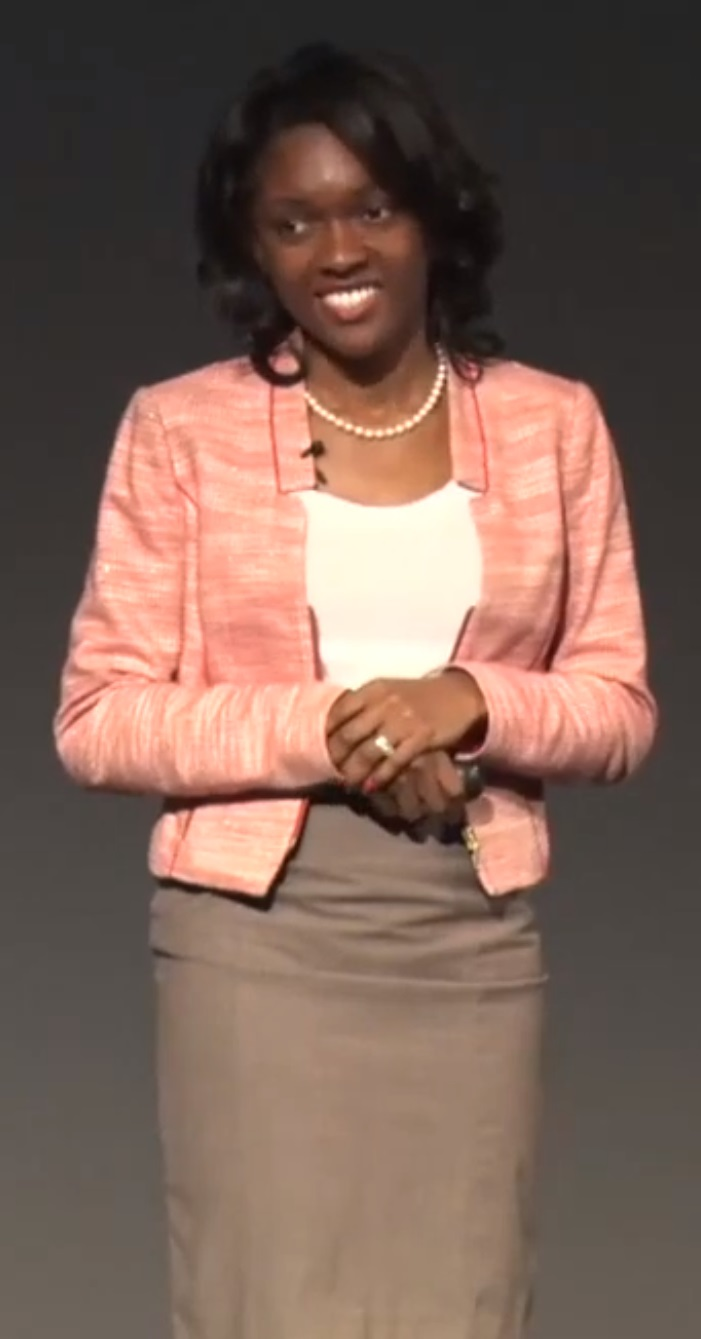
- Bell at the Medical Imaging and Deep Learning 2019 conference in London
- Born: United States
- Education: Massachusetts Institute of Technology (B.S.); Duke University (Ph.D.)
- Awards: Innovators Under 35 (2016); NSF CAREER Award (2018); Sloan Research Fellowship (2019); NSF Alan T. Waterman Award (2024)
- Scientific career
- Fields: Photoacoustic imaging; Medical ultrasound; Beamforming; Artificial intelligence
- Workplaces: Johns Hopkins University
- Website: pulselab.jhu.edu

Muyinatu "Bisi" A. Lediju Bell is the John C. Malone Associate Professor of Biomedical Engineering, Electrical and Computer Engineering, and Computer Science at Johns Hopkins University. She is also the director of the Photoacoustic and Ultrasonic Systems Engineering Laboratory.

She has received an Innovators Under 35 award, Sloan Research Fellowship, NSF CAREER Award, and the NSF Alan T. Waterman Award, which is the highest honor in the nation to early-career scientists and engineers.

== Early life and education ==
Bell grew up in Brooklyn, New York. She decided she was going to be a scientist at the age of six. She attended Brooklyn Technical High School and was selected to take part in a math and science program for successful women sophomores. She studied at Massachusetts Institute of Technology, graduating with a bachelor's degree in mechanical engineering in 2006. She was involved in several societies, including the Biomedical Engineering Society, the Black Women's Alliance, the Black Student Union, and the Women's Technology Program. She joined Duke University for her postgraduate studies. Bell received a Whitaker Foundation International Fellowship to lead a research project at the Institute of Cancer Research and Royal Marsden Hospital from 2009 to 2010.

In 2012, she finished her PhD and was also selected to take part in the University of Michigan NextProf workshop. Her graduate dissertation research was supported by a UNCF/Merck Graduate Dissertation Fellowship. Bell became a postdoctoral fellow at Johns Hopkins University, working in the centre for Computer-Integrated Surgical Systems and Technology. Her postdoctoral appointment was supported by both UNCF/Merck and the Ford Foundation.

== Career and research ==
Bell joined the faculty of Johns Hopkins University as an interim assistant research professor. She works with the Laboratory for Computational Sensing and Robotics to develop systems that can control individual ultrasound and photoacoustic components. She is exploring various medical robots for treating and diagnosing medical conditions. She launched an online course, Introduction to Medical Imaging, on Udemy in 2015. That year she was awarded a National Institutes of Health K99/R00 Pathway to Independence Award. This allowed her to evaluate coherence-based photoacoustic image guidance for transsphenoidal surgery. She holds a patent in short-lag spatial coherence beamforming, which can be used for photoacoustic image guidance of medical procedures such as skull base surgery or prostate brachytherapy. She provided a free MATLAB toolbox UltraSound Toolbox to help process ultrasonic signals. In 2016, she founded PULSE, the Photoacoustic and Ultrasonic Systems Engineering Laboratory. She was included in the MIT Technology Review 2016 list of 35 Innovators Under 35.

Bell joined the faculty of biomedical engineering at Johns Hopkins University in January 2017. As an assistant professor, she was awarded a National Institutes of Health Trailblazer Award in 2018. The award uses machine learning to improve the quality of ultrasound images. She explored convolutional neural networks that input data and output readable images that are free from artefacts. She took part in the 2017 Deep Learning in Healthcare Summit in Boston. She was awarded a 2018 Johns Hopkins University Discovery Award, which allowed her to explore the use of photoacoustic image guidance in gynaecological surgeries. She was awarded an NSF CAREER Award in 2018 to allow her to advance photoacoustic-guided surgery. This will help surgeons avoid damaging vital structures during operations. She was invited by the National Academy of Engineering to participate in the U.S. Frontiers of Engineering Symposium in 2018. She was awarded a Sloan Research Fellowship and she was named Maryland's Outstanding Young Engineer by the Maryland Academy of Sciences and the Maryland Science Center in 2019.

Bell is the 2021 winner of the SPIE Early Career Achievement Award, in recognition of her pioneering contributions to photoacoustic imaging for surgical guidance, including innovative technology designs, novel deep learning applications, informative spatial coherence beamforming theory, and visionary clinical possibilities. She was elected as a 2022 Fellow of the American Institute for Medical and Biological Engineering for pioneering contributions to development of ultrasonic and photoacoustic medical imaging systems, including coherence-based beamforming, photoacoustic-guided surgery, and deep-learning applications. Bell was later promoted to associate professor with tenure in July 2022.

In 2024, Bell received the highest honor in the nation to early-career scientists and engineers: the NSF Alan T. Waterman Award. In 2025, she was awarded the Benjamin Franklin NextGen Award from the Franklin Institute, which places her on a roster of more than two centuries of the greatest minds in science and engineering who have received Franklin Institute Awards.

Bell is a senior member of both the Institute of Electrical and Electronics Engineers (IEEE) and SPIE. She is also a fellow of AIMBE, SPIE, and Optica. She regularly attends IEEE and SPIE conferences, she is active in the IEEE Women in Engineering community, and she supports SPIE women in optics activities.

== Awards and honors ==
Bell's awards and honors include:

- 2025 Benjamin Franklin NextGen Award from the Franklin Institute
- 2024 NSF Alan T. Waterman Award
- 2024 Fellow of Optica
- 2023 Fellow of SPIE
- 2022 Fellow of AIMBE
- 2021 SPIE Early Career Achievement Award
- 2019 Sloan Research Fellowship
- 2019 Maryland's Outstanding Young Engineer Award
- 2019 Alan C. Davis Medal from the Maryland Academy of Sciences
- 2018 NSF CAREER Award
- 2018 National Institutes of Health Trailblazer Award
- 2018 National Academy of Engineering, U.S. Frontiers of Engineering Symposium, Invited Participant
- 2018 Johns Hopkins Discovery Award
- 2016 MIT Technology Review 35 Innovators Under 35
- 2015 National Institutes of Health K99/R00 Pathway to Independence Award
- 2015 UNCF/Merck Postdoctoral Fellowship
- 2015 Ford Foundation Postdoctoral Fellowship
- 2011 UNCF/Merck Graduate Science Research Dissertation Fellowship
- 2009 Whitaker International Fellowship
