= Natalie S. King =

American professor

- Education: University of Florida
- Scientific career
- Thesis: Awakening and Elevating the Voices of African American Girls : Counterstories of Informal and Formal STEM Learning Experiences (2016)

Natalie S. King is an associate professor at Georgia State University. She is known for her work on curriculum development and learning in K - 12 education with a particular focus on science education for Black girls. She was a 2023 recipient of the Alan T. Waterman Award.

== Education and career ==
King received her B.S. and M.Ed. from the University of Florida. She went on to teach at Eastside High School (Gainesville, Florida) for three years before returning to the University of Florida for her Ph.D. As of 2026 she is an associate professor at Georgia State University.

== Research ==
King's goal is to prepare educators to teach science, with a particular focus on encourage Black and Brown students to participate science. She works in the classrom and outside the classroom, and in 2012 King established a summer camp, I AM STEM, that is designed to introduce Black girls to STEM.

== Awards and honors ==
King received the Alan T. Waterman Award in 2023.

== Selected publications ==
- King, Natalie S.; Wade-Jaimes, Katherine; Morgan, Patricia Dunac (2018). "DECODING CAREERS IN DNA: Genetic coding lesson brings computational biology and STEM careers to life". The Science Teacher. 85 (5): 54–59. ISSN 0036-8555.
- King, Natalie S.; Pringle, Rose M. (2019). "Black girls speak STEM: Counterstories of informal and formal learning experiences". Journal of Research in Science Teaching. 56 (5): 539–569. doi:10.1002/tea.21513. ISSN 0022-4308.
- Wade‐Jaimes, Katherine; King, Natalie S.; Schwartz, Reneé (2021). ""You could like science and not be a science person ": Black girls' negotiation of space and identity in science". Science Education. 105 (5): 855–879. doi:10.1002/sce.21664. ISSN 0036-8326.
- King, Natalie S.; Upadhyay, Bhaskar (2022). "Negotiating mentoring relationships and support for Black and Brown early‐career faculty". Science Education. 106 (5): 1149–1171. doi:10.1002/sce.21755. ISSN 0036-8326.
- King, Natalie S.; Peña-Telfer, Laura; Earls, Shaeroya (2023-07-22). ""The Work I Do Matters": Cultivating a STEM Counterspace for Black Girls through Social-Emotional Development and Culturally Sustaining Pedagogies". Education Sciences. 13 (7): 754. doi:10.3390/educsci13070754. ISSN 2227-7102.
