= Jens Ludwig (economist) =

American economist (born 1968)

- Born: 1968 (age 57–58); Frankfurt, Germany
- Education: Rutgers University, Duke University
- Known for: Research on gun violence and crime
- Awards: 2006 David Kershaw Prize from the Association for Public Policy Analysis and Management
- Scientific career
- Fields: Economics
- Institutions: University of Chicago
- Thesis: Information and inner city educational attainment (1994)
- Doctoral advisor: Philip J. Cook

Jens Ludwig is a German-American economist. He is the Edwin A. and Betty L. Bergman Distinguished Service Professor at the University of Chicago’s Harris School of Public Policy, Pritzker Director of the University of Chicago Crime Lab, and co-director of the Education Lab.

Ludwig is also Project Director for the long-term evaluation of the Moving to Opportunity (MTO) randomized housing mobility experiment at the National Bureau of Economic Research (NBER), where he is also co-director of the Working Group on Economics of Crime and a Research Associate in the Program on Children and the Health Economics Program.

Among a variety of other current and previous posts, in 2012 Ludwig was also elected as Vice President of Association for Public Policy Analysis and Management and as a member of the National Academy of Medicine. In 2006 he received the David N. Kershaw Prize for contributions to public policy. His research focuses on social policy, particularly urban issues such as poverty, crime, and education.

== Select publications ==
- J. Ludwig; D. L. Miller (1 February 2007). "Does Head Start Improve Children's Life Chances? Evidence from a Regression Discontinuity Design". The Quarterly Journal of Economics. 122 (1): 159–208. doi:10.1162/QJEC.122.1.159. ISSN 0033-5533. Wikidata Q106638299.
- J. Ludwig; G. J. Duncan; P. Hirschfield (1 May 2001). "Urban Poverty and Juvenile Crime: Evidence from a Randomized Housing-Mobility Experiment". The Quarterly Journal of Economics. 116 (2): 655–679. doi:10.1162/00335530151144122. ISSN 0033-5533. Zbl 0996.91552. Wikidata Q106638303.
- Jon Kleinberg; Himabindu Lakkaraju; Jure Leskovec; Jens Ludwig; Sendhil Mullainathan (February 2017). "Human Decisions and Machine Predictions" (PDF). National Bureau of Economic Research Working Paper Series. National Bureau of Economic Research Working Paper Series (23180). National Bureau of Economic Research. doi:10.3386/W23180. ISSN 0898-2937. Wikidata Q105835173.
