= Evaluation Review =

- Discipline: Research Methods
- Language: English
- Edited by: Jacob Klerman

Publication details
- History: 1977-present
- Publisher: SAGE Publications
- Frequency: Bimonthly
- Impact factor: 1.436 (2017)

Standard abbreviations
- ISO 4: Eval. Rev.

Indexing
- ISSN: 0193-841X (print); 1552-3926 (web)
- LCCN: 80643924
- OCLC no.: 5267706

Links
- Journal homepage; Online access; Online archive

Evaluation Review is a peer-reviewed academic journal that publishes papers in the field of Social Sciences. The journal's editor is Jacob Klerman (Abt Associates). It was first published in 1977 by SAGE Publications, who continue to publish the journal today.

== Scope ==
Evaluation Review (ERX) aims to bring together applied evaluation methods used in a wide range of disciplines. The journal is an interdisciplinary forum for social science researchers, planners, and policy makers who develop, implement, and utilize studies designed to improve the human condition. Evaluation Review publishes papers on quantitative and qualitative methodological developments, as well as related applied research issues.

== Abstracting and indexing ==
Evaluation Review is abstracted and indexed in, among other databases: SCOPUS, and the Social Sciences Citation Index. According to the Journal Citation Reports, its 2017 impact factor is 1.436, ranking it 34 out of 98 journals in the category 'Social Sciences, Interdisciplinary'.
