= Innovators Under 35 =

- Awarded for: Exceptionally talented young innovators whose work has the greatest potential to transform the world.
- Country: United States
- Presented by: MIT Technology Review
- Hosted by: Emtech conference
- Formerly called: TR100; TR35
- First award: 1999
- Website: technologyreview.com/lists/innovators-under-35

The Innovators Under 35 is a peer-reviewed annual award and listicle published by MIT Technology Review magazine, naming the world's top 35 innovators under the age of 35.

== Background ==
They have 5 categories of innovators, Visionaries, Pioneers, Inventors, Humanitarians, Entrepreneurs. There are also subcategories, and although they change from year to year, they generally focus on biomedicine, computing, communications, business, energy, materials, and the web. Nominations are sent from around the world and evaluated by a panel of expert judges. In some years, an Innovator of the Year or a Humanitarian of the Year is also named from among the winners.

The purpose of the award is to honor "Exceptionally talented young innovators whose work has the greatest potential to transform the world."

== History ==
The award was started in 1999 as the TR100, with 100 winners, but was changed to TR35 (35 winners) starting in 2005. The awards are presented to the winners at the annual Emtech conference on emerging technologies, held in the fall at the Massachusetts Institute of Technology (MIT), where there is an awards ceremony and reception. There are several regional TR35 lists produced by Technology Review also, such as the list of the top 35 innovators under 35 in Europe, MENA, Latin America, Asia Pacific, China and India. The regional winners are automatically qualified as candidates for the global list.

In 2013, the list was renamed to Innovators Under 35.

=== Laureates ===
Laureates of the award include the co-founder of Facebook, Mark Zuckerberg, the co-founders of Google, Larry Page and Sergey Brin, the co-founder of Tesla, JB Straubel, co-founder of iRobot, Helen Greiner, Linus Torvalds, Muyinatu Bell, Ewan Birney, Katherine Isbister, Jay Shendure, Mandy Chessell, Eben Upton, Shinjini Kundu, Shawn Fanning, Amy S. Bruckman, Himabindu Lakkaraju, Ali Khademhosseini, Rediet Abebe, Ahmad Nabeel, Vivian Chu, Philip S. Low, Mike Horia Mihail Teodorescu, and Thomas Truong.

== Notable people ==
- Juliana Chan, Singaporean biologist and science communicator
- Aaron Dollar, Yale University professor of Mechanical Engineering & Materials Science and Computer Science
- Idoia Ochoa, electrical engineer.

== See also ==
- Forbes Magazine's 30 under 30
- Fortune's 40 Under 40
- WEF's Young Global Leaders
- Capital's Top 40 unter 40
- The Business Journal's Forty Under 40
