= Shinjini Kundu =

Indian American physician and computer scientist

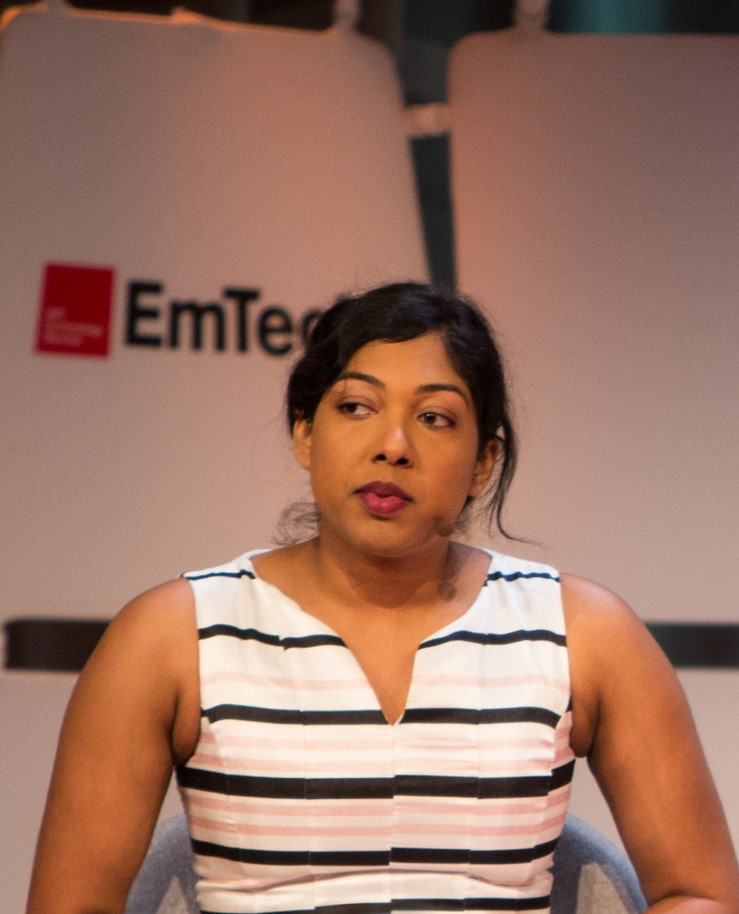
- Kundu at EmTech in 2018
- Education: Stanford University; Carnegie Mellon University; University of Pittsburgh
- Employer: Washington University in St. Louis

Shinjini Kundu (born 1990) is an Indian American physician and computer scientist at Washington University School of Medicine in St. Louis, Missouri. Her research focuses on designing artificial intelligence systems to detect diseases that may be imperceptible to humans. She was named one of Forbes 30 under 30, MIT Technology Review's 35 innovators under 35, a World Economic Forum Young Global Leader, and a winner of the Carnegie Science Award.

== Early life and education ==
Before completing high school at 16, Kundu would help her father, a computer engineer, take apart computers. This influenced her studies at Stanford University, where she graduated with a bachelor's and master's degree in electrical engineering, and served as editor in chief of the university's undergraduate research journal. During this time, a class on medical imaging led Kundu into the medical field, where she believed she could use her expertise to diagnose patients faster. Kundu enrolled in the Medical Scientist Training Program conducted by Carnegie Mellon University and the University of Pittsburgh. Subsequently, she completed her residency and fellowship at Johns Hopkins Hospital in radiology and neuroradiology, respectively. Prior to her doctoral program, Kundu also trained as an Indian classical dancer and performed at Madison Square Garden.

== Research ==
Kundu's research focuses on "transport-based morphometry," or TBM, which applies machine learning techniques to identify latent disease not readily observable by humans reviewing traditional magnetic resonance imaging (MRIs). Kundu has authored or co-authored eighteen peer-reviewed articles, including in the journals Nature Medicine and Proceedings of the National Academy of Sciences and has presented at the International Conference on Acoustics, Speech, and Signal Processing.

In 2018, Kundu was a speaker at the United Nations A.I. for Good global summit in Geneva, Switzerland, where her input on transparent A.I. in medicine was adopted as a priority area under Sustainable Development Goal 3.

== Accolades ==
In 2018, Dr. Kundu was listed to Forbes 30 Under 30's 2019 list, recognizing her contributions in healthcare. She was also named one of MIT Technology Review's 35 innovators under 35 for her creation of "an artificial-intelligence system that can analyze them [medical images] to find patterns undetectable to the naked eye. Her innovation could have a fundamental impact on the way we detect and treat diseases." Dr. Kundu was also the winner of the 2018 Carnegie Science Award.

In 2017, Dr. Kundu was one of four academics recognized at NRI of the Year, Times Now's annually televised Indian awards show recognizing achievement by those of Indian descent. In 2017, an Elle magazine article remarked, “Not only is she one of the world’s youngest MD-PhD scientists, she has developed technology that could possibly diagnose diseases as early as three years before the symptoms manifest in the patient and she actively works towards the inclusion of more women in STEM (Science Technology Engineering and Math).”

In 2016, Dr. Kundu was recognized in Pittsburgh Magazine's "40 Under 40," which wrote "The lightning speed of Shinjini Kundu’s academic progress could test the laws of physics, much less those of probability."

== Selected publications ==
- S. Kundu, AI in medicine must be explainable (2021) in Nature Medicine 27(8): 1328-1328.
- S. Kundu, Measuring trustworthiness is crucial for medical AI tools (2023) in Nature Human Behaviour 7(11): 1812-1813.
- S. Kundu, J. Bryk and A. Alam, Resolution of Suicidal Ideation With Corticosteroids in a Patient With Concurrent Addison’s Disease and Depression (2014) in Primary Care Companion for CNS Disorders 16(6).
- S. Kundu et al., Enabling early detection of osteoarthritis from presymptomatic cartilage texture maps via transport-based learning (2020) in Proceedings of the National Academy of Sciences 117(40) 24709-24719.
- S.R. Park, S. Kolouri, S. Kundu, and G. Rodhe, The cumulative distribution transform and linear pattern classification (2017) in Applied and Computational Harmonic Analysis (forthcoming)
