= Asegun Henry =

American mechanical engineer

Asegun Sekou Famake Henry is the George N. Hatsopoulos Professor in Thermodynamics and Area Head for Energy Science and Engineering in the Department of mechanical engineering at Massachusetts Institute of Technology. His research is focused on energy storage, heat transfer, and phonons.

== Early life and education ==
Henry was born in Northampton Massacusetts, to Anthony Henry and Oare Dozier-Henry, both former professors at Florida A&M University (FAMU); his father was a middle school teacher and adjunct professor of political science and his mother was a professor of adult education. At a young age, his parents exposed him to West African and African-American culture. At ten years old, he started playing the djembe. Henry also excelled in school and was admitted into a state program for gifted children. After graduating from high school, he attended FAMU and graduated with a bachelor's degree in mechanical engineering. Working under Gang Chen, he earned his master's and doctorate degrees in mechanical engineering from Massachusetts Institute of Technology (MIT) in 2009.

== Career and research ==
After graduating from MIT, Henry worked as a postdoc in materials science at Oak Ridge National Laboratory, researching derivations of thermal conductivity from first principles, and later at Northwestern University, where he investigated the thermodynamic properties of oxides. He received research fellowships from the Lemelson Foundation, the Department of Energy, the UNCF, and Ford Foundation.

In 2011, Henry was a fellow of the Advanced Research Projects Agency–Energy before he joined Georgia Institute of Technology in April 2012 as assistant professor in the George W. Woodruff School of Mechanical Engineering.

In 2016, Henry earned the National Science Foundation’s Career Award with a grant to study heat conduction via vibrations referred to as phonons. Using sonification, his research hopes to create an educational app to represent the unique vibrations of the elements in the periodic table as sounds audible to the human ear and to study the interaction between the different modes of vibration.

On January 23, 2017, Henry’s team at Georgia Tech also achieved the highest recorded operating temperature, 1,200 °C (1,470 K), for a liquid pump which operated continuously for 72 hours. The achievement was recognized by the Guinness World Records. The pump is made entirely of ceramic materials and was able to pump molten tin heated to very high temperatures.

Henry also conducts research into cost-effective methods to store renewable energy. In a 2018 paper published Energy & Environmental Science, his team described a storage system, TEGS-MPV (thermal energy grid storage using multi-junction photovoltaics) and given the moniker "Sun in a box" in media sources. TEGS-MPV uses molten silicon as a battery to store energy as heat, ready to be delivered into an electrical grid on demand. The system is slated to have capital costs significantly lower than existing electrical energy storage systems.
