= Juliana Chan (science communicator) =

Singaporean biologist and science communicator

- Education: University of Cambridge (BA, MA); Massachusetts Institute of Technology (PhD)
- Occupations: Biologist, science communicator
- Known for: Founder and CEO of Wildtype Media Group

Juliana Chan is a Singaporean biologist, a science communicator, the founder of Asian Scientist, and the founder and CEO of Wildtype Media Group.

== Early life and education ==
Chan graduated from the University of Cambridge with both a BA and an MA in natural science. She graduated from MIT in 2010 with a PhD in biology. After graduation, Chan interned at Changi General Hospital before coming to the realization that medicine was not her calling. She sought out an education scholarship, receiving a fellowship from A*STAR, a Singaporean research institute, which led to a $750,000 startup grant; Chan was able to use this to start her own lab at Nanyang Technological University (NTU) and the Lee Kong Chian School of Medicine.

== Career ==
While working as a biomedical researcher at NTU, Chan started a blog called Asian Scientist. She cited the need to escape from the "insularity and isolation" of scientific research in starting the blog. The blog became popular enough to lead to a partnership with the publishing house World Scientific Publishing, enabling Chan to turn Asian Scientist into a magazine and serve as its editor-in-chief.

Chan founded Wildtype Media Group in 2018, leaving both her role as editor of Asian Scientist and running her research lab at NTU; Chan recognized the risk of taking on an entrepreneurial career but said she found a calling in helping to "make Asian scientists household names". Wildtype is described as the first "STEM-focused media company in Singapore that provides professional science communication services to government agencies, industry, and academia in Singapore as well as the broader Asian region".

Chan holds 4 patents in the United States and has designed nanoparticles for drug delivery and developed systems to grow blood capillaries in microfluidic devices. In 2015, Chan was appointed as a Young Global Leader, a program created by the World Economic Forum to recognize highly accomplished professionals in their field.

Chan transitioned Wildtype to full remote work in August 2023, citing the impacts from the COVID-19 pandemic and calling remote work "the future of work". She has also more recently transitioned into a being a LinkedIn coach, in order to help "executives build their professional brand".

== Awards and honors ==
- In 2011, Chan was the recipient of an L’Oréal For Women in Science National Fellowship award
- In 2013, Chan won the Singapore Youth Award
- In 2014, Chan was recognized by MIT Technology Review as one of the top 10 Innovators Under 35
- In 2018, Chan was recognized by Tatler Asia's Gen.T list which honors future Asian leaders
