= National Board for Professional Teaching Standards =

Body certifying teachers

The National Board for Professional Teaching Standards (NBPTS) is a nonpartisan, nonprofit organization in the United States. Founded in 1987, NBPTS develops and maintains advanced standards for educators and offers a national, voluntary assessment, National Board Certification, based on the NBPTS Standards. As of December 2017, more than 118,000 educators have become National Board Certified Teachers in the United States. Its headquarters is located in Arlington County, Virginia

== History ==
The board was formed in response to a 1986 report issued by the Task Force on Teaching as a Profession, a group funded by the Carnegie Forum on Education, of the Carnegie Corporation of New York. The report, entitled A Nation Prepared: Teachers for the 21st Century, called for the creation of a board to “define what teachers should know and be able to do” and to “support the creation of a rigorous, valid assessment to see that certified teachers do meet these standards.” Former governor of North Carolina, James B. Hunt Jr., served as the first chair of the NBPTS Board of Directors, and former Ford Foundation executive, James A. Kelly, became the National Board's first president.

In 1999, the NBPTS Board of Directors honored Kelly by establishing the James A. Kelly Award for Advancing Accomplished Teaching. The award is given “to recognize and honor individuals who provide clear, consistent and convincing evidence of their ability to foster Mr. Kelly’s legacy of accomplished teaching.” Recipients of the James A. Kelly Award include President Bill Clinton, Edward B. Rust, Senator Arlen Specter, Governor Roy Barnes, Linda Darling-Hammond, Governor Ted Strickland, Governor James B. Hunt Jr., Secretary Richard Riley, Barbara Kelley, Terry Holliday, Ronald Thorpe, Michael Kirst, President Barack Obama, Senator Herb Kohl, Mary Hatwood Futrell, and Barnett Berry.

== Standards ==
National Board's standards are based on "Five Core Propositions" and provide a reference that helps educators link teaching standards to teaching practice.

The Five Core Propositions consist of the following:

- Proposition 1: Teachers are committed to students and their learning
- Proposition 2: Teachers know the subjects they teach and how to teach those subjects to students
- Proposition 3: Teachers are responsible for managing and monitoring student learning
- Proposition 4: Teachers think systematically about their practice and learn from experience
- Proposition 5: Teachers are members of learning communities

The National Board publishes standards of “accomplished teaching” for 25 certificate areas and developmental levels for pre-K through 12th grade. These standards were developed and validated by representative councils of master teachers, disciplinary organizations and other education experts.

== National Board Certification ==
National Board Certification is a voluntary advanced professional certification based on the NBPTS standards. There are 25 different certificates available. Candidates for National Board Certification must complete four components: three portfolio entries, submitted online, and a computer-based assessment, which is administered at a testing center.

The assessment fee is $1900; however, financial support is available.

Each year, National Board Certified Teachers participate in a nationwide celebration entitled Team NBCT week. This celebration recognizes and acknowledges the achievement of all new and renewed National Board Certified Teachers, particularly those who achieved during the current candidate cycle.

== Research ==
Since its founding, the National Board has been the subject of academic research. The scope of this research has included such matters as a review of the impact of National Board Certification on student performance, the quality of teaching by National Board Certified Teachers in the classroom, and the influence of the process on teacher retention.

In 2008, the United States National Research Council a division of the National Academies published a report stating that "Students taught by NBPTS-certified teachers make greater gains on achievement tests than students taught by teachers who are not board-certified."

In 2008 it was found in LA Unified Schools that “the difference in impacts [on student achievement] between [Board-certified teachers] and unsuccessful applicants was statistically significant.”

In 2015, researchers found that in Washington State, “[Board-] certified teachers are more effective than non-certified teachers with similar experience.” Their findings suggest National Board Certified Teachers produce gains of up to “nearly 1.5 months of additional learning.”
