= Barnett Berry =

American academic

Barnett Berry, currently a senior researcher at the Learning Policy Institute and advisor for the Center for Reimagining Education at the University of Kansas, was a research professor at the University of South Carolina, where he is the founding director of Accelerating for Learning and Leadership for South Carolina (ALL4SC) — an initiative launched in 2019, to marshal the resources of an entire R1 institution of higher education in service of high need school communities. Barnett's career includes serving as a high school teacher, a social scientist at the RAND Corporation, a professor at UofSC (in the 1990s), a senior state education agency leader, and senior consultant with the National Commission on Teaching and America's Future, leading its state partnership network. From 1999 to 2018, Barnett led Center for Teaching Quality website, a non-profit he founded to conduct research and ignite teacher leadership to transform the teaching profession and public education for more equitable outcomes for students. Barnett has authored a wide array of over 120 policy and research reports, journal articles, and commissioned papers. His two books, TEACHING 2030 and Teacherpreneurs: Innovative Teachers Who Lead But Don't Leave, frame a bold vision for the profession's future. He is the 2021 recipient of the James A. Kelly Award for Advancing Accomplished Teaching from the National Board for Professional Teaching Standards and is a policy advisor for the Learning Policy Institute.

== Education ==
Barnett Berry received his B.A. in sociology from the University of South Carolina in 1977 and continued there to receive his M.Ed. in curriculum in 1978. He received his Ph.D. in educational administration and policy studies from the University of North Carolina at Chapel Hill in 1984.

== Career ==
Barnett Berry began his career as a public high school social studies teacher in Columbia, SC where he taught for three years. After completing his doctorate at the University of North Carolina at Chapel Hill, Berry joined the RAND Corporation as an associate social scientist where he worked with Linda Darling-Hammond.

In 1987, Berry became the associate director of the South Carolina Educational Policy Center at the University of South Carolina before moving on to become senior executive in the Division of Policy at the South Carolina State Department of Education in 1991. From 1992 to 1999, he served as associate professor in the College of Education at the University of South Carolina.

In 1998, Berry was named Director, Policy and State Relations, for the National Commission on Teaching and America's Future (NCTAF) at Teachers College, Columbia University where he then became Interim Director (2001-2002).

Berry founded the Southeast Center for Teaching Quality in 1999 at the University of North Carolina at Chapel Hill, which would later become known as the Center for Teaching Quality (CTQ). Over its 16-year history, CTQ has evolved from a think tank supporting teaching as a profession to an action tank for teacher leadership. In 2003, CTQ launched the nation's first virtual network of teacher leaders. The CTQ Collaboratory now welcomes teachers (and all who support teachers as leaders) to connect, learn, and collaborate to drive change.

== Publications ==
Books

- Berry, B., Byrd, A., & Wieder, A. (2013). Teacherpreneurs: Innovative teachers who lead but don't leave. Jossey-Bass.
- Berry, B., & The TeacherSolutions 2030 Team (Barnett, J., Betlach, K., C'de Baca, S., Highley, S., Holland, J., Kamm, C., Moore, R., Rigsbee, C., Sacks, A., Vickery, E., Vilson, J., & Wasserman, L.) (2011). TEACHING 2030: What we must do for our students and our public schools... now and in the future. NY: Teachers College Press.

Book chapters

- Berry, B., Zeichner, N., & Evans, R. (forthcoming, 2015). Teacher leadership for a reinvented teaching profession. In Jelmer Evers & Rene Kneyber (eds.), Flip the System. New York: Routledge.
- Berry. B. (forthcoming, 2015). Teacherpreneurs: Cultivating and scaling up a bold brand of teacher leadership. In Ann Lieberman, Teacher Leadership in the International Context.
- Berry, B. (2013). Good schools and teachers for all students: Dispensing myths, facing evidence, and pursuing the right strategies. In Kevin Welner & Prudence Carter (eds.), Closing the opportunity gap: What America must do to give all children an even chance (pp. 181–194). New York: New Press.
- Berry, B. & Byrd, A. (2012). New teacher induction—In and out of cyberspace. In Desimone, L, Smith, T., & Porter, A (eds.), Issues in Induction and Mentoring. 2012 National Society for the Study of Education (NSSE) Yearbook, 111(2).
- Berry, B. (2010). Creating and sustaining urban teacher residencies. In Curtis, R.E., & Wurtzel, J. (eds.), Teaching talent: A visionary framework for human capital in education (pp. 129–150). Cambridge: Harvard Education Press.
- Berry, B., & Norton, J. (2006). America's teaching profession and the Teacher Leaders Network. In R. Ackerman & S. V. Mackenzie, Uncovering teacher leadership (pp. 351–356). Thousand Oaks, CA: Corwin Press.
- Berry, B. (2006). Teacher quality and the teaching profession: New messages, new messengers. In K. Jones (ed.), Raising schools: A democratic model for school accountability (pp. 79–106). Lanham, MD: Scarecrow Press.
- Berry, B., Hoke, M., & Hirsch, E. (2004). No Child Left Behind, “highly qualified” teachers, and the teaching profession: Lessons from the field. In D. M. Moss, W. J. Glenn, & R. L. Schwab (eds.), Portrait of a profession: Teaching and teachers in the 21st Century (pp. 175–206). Westport, CT: Praeger Publishers.
- Berry, B. (2003). Teacher supply, demand, and quality. In James W. Guthrie (ed.), Encyclopedia of Education, second edition. New York: Macmillan Press, 2002.
- Berry, B., Darling-Hammond, L., & Haselkorn, D. (1999). Transforming teacher recruitment, selection, and induction: Strategies for transforming the teaching profession. In L. Darling-Hammond & G. Sykes (eds.), The Heart of the Matter: Teaching as a Learning Profession (pp. 183–232). San Francisco: Jossey-Bass.
- Ginsberg, R. & Berry, B. (1998). Expanding responsibility to enhance accountability. In R.J.S. MacPherson (ed.), The Politics of Accountability: Educative and International Perspectives (pp. 43–61). Thousand Oaks, CA: Corwin Press.
- Ishler, R., Edens, K., & Berry, B. (1996). Teacher education curriculum: Elementary education. In J. Sikula, T. Buttery, & E. Guyton (eds.), Handbook of Research on Teacher Education (pp. 348–377). New York: MacMillan.

Selected journal and magazine articles

- Berry, B. (Forthcoming, 2015). Teacherpreneurs: Cultivating and scaling up a bold brand of teacher leadership. The New Educator, 11(2).
- Berry, B. (2014). Clearing the way for teacher leadership. Education Week, 34(9), 20–21.
- Berry, B. (2014). Going to scale with teacherpreneurs. Phi Delta Kappan, 95(7), 8–14.
- Berry, B. & Hess, F. (2013). Expanded learning, expansive teacher leadership. Phi Delta Kappan 94(5), 58–61.
- Berry, B. (2013). Teacherpreneurs and the future of teaching and learning. International Journal of Innovation, Creativity and Change, 1(2).
- Berry, B. (2013). Teacherpreneurs: A bold brand of teacher leadership for 21st-century teaching and learning. Science, 340(6130), 309–310.
- Berry, B. & Hess, R. (2013). Expanding learning, expansive teacher leadership. Phi Delta Kappan, 94(5), 58–61.
- Berry, B. & Hess, R. (2012). Expanding learning time: An avenue to greater change. Education Week commentary, 32(14), 26–27.
- Berry, B. (2011). Creating the teaching profession that 21st-century students deserve. AdvancED Source, Fall 2011, 5–6.
- Berry, B. (2011). Teacherpreneurs: A more powerful vision for the teaching profession. Phi Delta Kappan, 92(6), 28- 33.
- Berry, B. (2011). We can create the profession students need. Education Week commentary, 30(17), 20–22.
- Berry, B. (2010). Getting “real” about teacher effectiveness and teacher retention. Journal of Curriculum and Instruction, 4(1), 1–15.
- Berry, B. & Moore, R. (2010). The teachers of 2030. Educational Leadership, 67(8), 36–40.
- Berry, B. (2009). Ending the battles over teaching. Education Week commentary, 28(32), 24, 28.
- Berry. B. (2008). The future of the teaching profession. Phi Delta Kappan International EDge, 4(2), 1-20.
- Berry, B., Wade, C. & Trantham, P. (2008). Using data, changing teaching. Educational Leadership. 66(4), 80–84.
- Berry, B., Montgomery, D., Curtis, R., Hernandez, M., Wurtzel, J., & Snyder, J. (2008). Urban teacher residencies: A new way to recruit, prepare, develop, and retain effective teachers for high-needs districts. Voices in Urban Education, Issue 20, 13–23.
- Berry, B. (2008). Staffing high-needs schools: Insights from the nation’s best teachers. Phi Delta Kappan, 89(10), 766–771.
- Berry, B., Norton, J., & Byrd, A. (2007). Lessons from networking. Educational Leadership, 65(1), 48–52.
- Darling-Hammond, L. & Berry, B. (2006). Highly qualified teachers for all. Educational Leadership, 64(3), 14–20.
- Berry, B., & Norton, J. (2006). Learn from the masters. Edutopia magazine, 45–48.
- Berry, B. (2005). Recruiting and retaining board certified teachers for hard-to-staff schools: Creating policies that will work. Phi Delta Kappan, 87(4), 290–297.
- Berry, B. (2005). Teacher quality and the question of preparation: It is time to get over the battle between teacher education and alternative certification. Education Week commentary, 25(8), 32, 34–35.
- Berry, B. (2005). The future of teacher education. Journal of Teacher Education, 56(3), 272–279.
- Berry, B., Johnson, D., & Montgomery, D. (2005). The power of teacher leadership. Educational Leadership, 62(5), 56–61.

Selected commissioned reports and papers

- Berry, B. & Hess, R. (2012). Extended learning opportunities & teacher leadership. New York: Ford Foundation.
- Berry, B. (2011). Creating teacher incentives for school excellence and equity. National Education Policy Center. Boulder, CO: University of Colorado-Boulder.
- Berry, B, (2011). Past as Prologue: A historical overview of teaching in America. Carrboro, NC: Center for Teaching Quality.
- Berry, B, (2011). New student assessments and advancing teaching as a results-oriented profession. A white paper developed for the Race to the Top Assessment Consortia. Seattle, WA: Gates Foundation.
- Berry, B. (2010). Teacher education for tomorrow. Washington, DC: National Council for Accreditation of Teacher Education.
- Berry, B., Daughtrey, A. & Wieder, A. (2010). Teacher leadership: Leading the way to effective teaching and learning. New York: Teachers Network.
- Berry, B., Daughtrey, A. & Wieder, A. (2010). Collaboration: Closing the effective teaching gap. New York: Teachers Network.
- Berry, B., Daughtrey, A. & Wieder, A. (2010). Preparing to lead an effective classroom: The role of teacher training and professional development programs. New York: Teachers Network.
- Berry, B., Daughtrey, A. & Wieder, A. (2010). A better system for schools: Developing, supporting and retaining effective teachers. New York: Teachers Network.
- Berry, B., Daughtrey, A., 7 Wieder, A. (2010, March). Teacher effectiveness: The conditions that matter most and a look to the future. Hillsborough, NC: Center for Teaching Quality for the National Council of State Legislatures.
- Berry, B. (2009). Children of poverty deserve great teachers: One union’s commitment to challenge the status quo. Washington DC: The National Education Association.
- Berry, B. (2009). The Strategic Management of Human Capital: Making the smart investments in teachers and principals. The Legacy Foundation and the Colorado Department of Education. Hillsborough, NC: Center for Teaching Quality.
- Berry, B., Smylie, M. & Fuller, E. (2008). Understanding teacher working conditions: A review and look to the future. Hillsborough, NC: Center for Teaching Quality.
- Berry, B. et al. (2008). Creating and Sustaining Urban Teacher Residencies: A new way to recruit, prepare, and retain effective teachers in high-needs districts. Washington DC: Aspen Institute.
- Berry, B. (2007). The National Board for Professional Teaching Standards and the future of a profession. Prepared for the National Board for Professional Teaching Standards 2020: Clarifying a vision for quality teaching. Racine, WI.
- Darling-Hammond, L., Berry, B., & Thoreson, A. (2001). Does teacher certification matter? Evaluating the evidence. Educational Evaluation and Policy Analysis, 23(1), 57–77.
- Berry, B. & Ginsberg R. (1990). Creating lead teachers: From policy to implementation. Phi Delta Kappan 71(8), 616–621.
- Berry, B. (1986). Why bright college students won't teach. Urban Review 18(4), 269–280.
