= Leon Sullivan =

Presidential Medal of Freedom recipient (1922–2001)

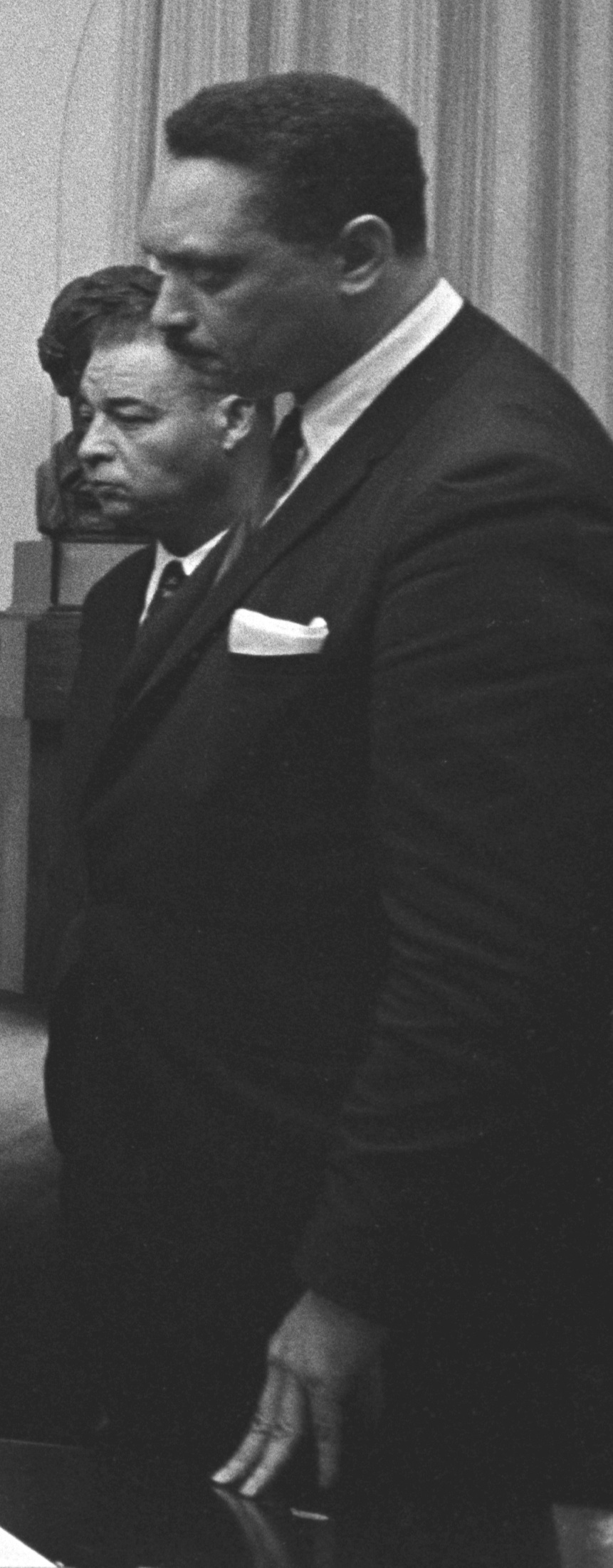
- Born: Leon Howard Sullivan; October 16, 1922; Charleston, West Virginia, U.S.
- Died: April 24, 2001 (aged 78); Scottsdale, Arizona, U.S.
- Education: West Virginia State University; Union Theological Seminary (BA); Columbia University (MA)
- Movement: Civil Rights Movement; Anti-Apartheid Movement

Leon Howard Sullivan (October 16, 1922 – April 24, 2001) was a Baptist minister, a civil rights leader and social activist focusing on the creation of job training opportunities for African Americans, a longtime General Motors Board Member, and an anti-Apartheid activist. Sullivan died of leukemia in a Scottsdale, Arizona hospital at the age of 78.

== Early life ==
Born to Charles and Helen Sullivan in Charleston, West Virginia, he was raised in a small house on a dirt alley called Washington Court--one of Charleston's poorest communities. His parents divorced when he was three years old and he grew up an only child. At the age of twelve, he tried to purchase a Coca-Cola in a drugstore on Capitol Street. The proprietor refused to sell him the drink saying: "Stand on your feet, boy. You can't sit here." This incident inspired Sullivan's lifetime pursuit of fighting racial prejudice.

Sullivan also attributed much of his early influence to his grandmother:

... my grandmother Carrie, a constant and powerful presence in my life who taught me early on the importance of faith, determination, faith in God, and especially self-help.

As a teenager, Sullivan — who as an adult stood 6 ft 5 in tall — attended Garnet High School, a school for African Americans in Charleston, West Virginia. He received both a basketball and a football scholarship to West Virginia State College where, in 1940, he was initiated into the Tau chapter of Kappa Alpha Psi fraternity. A foot injury that ended his athletic career and scholarships forced Sullivan to pay for the remainder of his college by working in a steel mill.

== Baptist minister ==
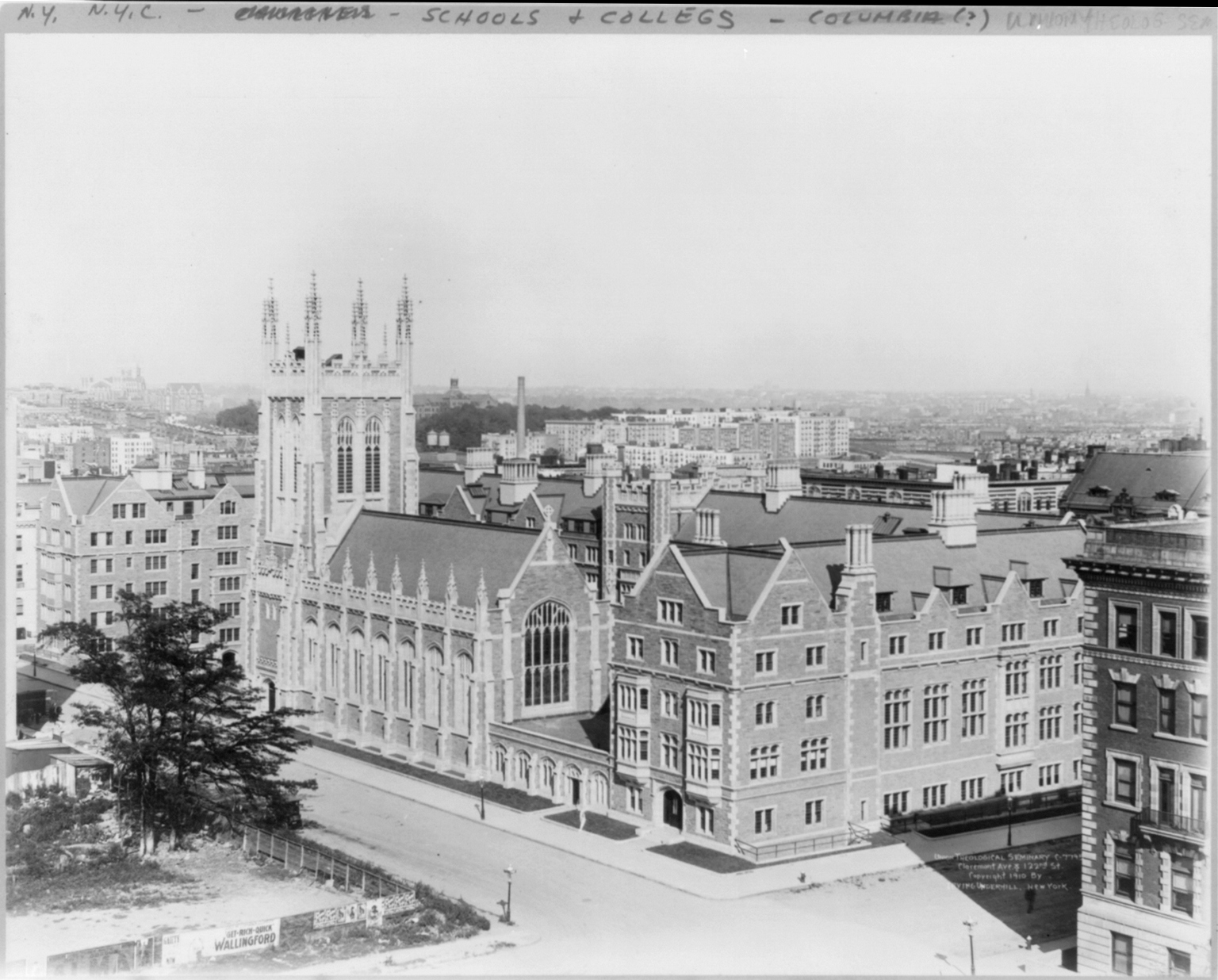
Union Theological Seminary in the City of New York

Sullivan became a Baptist minister in West Virginia at the age of 18. In 1943, Adam Clayton Powell, a noted black minister, visited West Virginia and convinced Sullivan to move to New York City where the latter attended the Union Theological Seminary (1943–45) and later Columbia University (Master's in Religion 1947). He also served as Powell's assistant minister at the Abyssinian Baptist Church. During this period, Sullivan met his wife Grace, a woman whom he referred to as "Amazing Grace." The couple would eventually have three children, Hope, Julie and Howard. One of Sullivan's greater achievements during his time in New York was the recruitment of a hundred colored men for the police force in Harlem with Mayor Fiorello LaGuardia's support and encouragement.

In 1945 Leon and Grace Sullivan moved to South Orange, New Jersey where Sullivan became pastor at the First Baptist Church. Five years later, the two moved to Philadelphia and Leon took on the role of pastor at the Zion Baptist Church. There, he became famously known as "the Lion of Zion".

== Selective Patronage Movement ==
Sullivan took his first active role in the civil rights movement by helping to organize a march on Washington, D.C., in the early 1940s. He believed that jobs were the key to improving African American lives. In 1958, he asked Philadelphia's largest companies to interview young blacks, and only two companies responded positively. Then, in collaboration with other ministers, Sullivan organized a boycott of various businesses which he referred to as "Selective Patronage." The slogan was "Don't buy where you don't work" and the boycott was extremely effective since blacks constituted about 20% of Philadelphia's population. Sullivan estimated the boycott produced thousands of jobs for African Americans in a period of four years. The New York Times featured the program with a front-page story, and later, Fortune magazine brought the program to greater public attention on a national scale. By 1962, the effectiveness of Sullivan's boycotts came to the attention of Dr. Martin Luther King Jr. and the SCLC who persuaded Sullivan to share information with them on his success. The exchange led to SCLC's economic arm, Operation Breadbasket, in 1967, headed by Jesse Jackson.

== Self-help movement ==
Sullivan's work was built on the principle of "self-help," which provided people with the tools to overcome barriers of poverty and oppression on their own. African-Americans had been excluded from training for better paying jobs. Sullivan realized that simply making jobs available was not enough and said,

I found that we needed training. Integration without preparation is frustration.

In 1964, Sullivan founded Opportunities Industrialization Centers (OIC) of America in an abandoned jail house in North Philadelphia. The program took individuals with little hope and few prospects, offered them job training and instruction in life skills, and then helped place them into jobs. The movement quickly spread around the nation. With sixty affiliated programs in thirty states and the District of Columbia, OIC has grown into a movement, which has served over two million disadvantaged and under-skilled people. This approach also led to the formation of the Opportunities Industrialization Centers International (OICI) in 1969.

Around the same time, Sullivan established the Zion Investment Association (ZIA), a company which invested in and started new businesses. Sullivan also helped to establish more than 20 programs under the International Foundation for Education and Self-Help (IFESH) (now headed by his daughter Dr. Julie Helen Sullivan), including the Global Sullivan Principles initiative. Other IFESH programs include the African American Summit (now renamed the Leon H. Sullivan Summit), the Peoples Investment Fund for Africa, the Self-Help Investment Program, Teachers for Africa, and Schools for Africa. IFESH has placed teachers in Africa, trained African bankers, built schools, developed small businesses, disseminated books and school supplies, created literacy programs, distributed medicines to prevent river-blindness, and helped to combat the spread of HIV/AIDS.

== 10-36 Plan ==
Sullivan used the church to organize the black community, and to create a local economic base that would self-perpetuate. In 1962, during a sermon, he proposed his vision of self-help to the community through investment. "One day I preached a sermon at Zion about Jesus feeding the five thousand with a few loaves and a few fish", he recalls. "Everybody put in their little bit and you had enough to feed everybody, and a whole lot left over. So I said, that is what I am going to do with the church and the community. I said, I am going to ask 50 people to put $10 down for 36 months of loaves and fishes and see if we could accumulate resources enough to build something that we would own ourselves."

The 10-36 Plan was designed to create two legal entities between a split stretch of donation periods; "For the first 16 months of the subscription period, investors would contribute to the Zion Non-Profit Charitable Trust (ZNPCT), a Community Development Corporation (CDC) that would support education, scholarships for youth, health services and other programs aimed at social uplift. For the remaining 20 months of the subscription period, investors would make payments to a for-profit corporation, Progress Investment Associates (PIA), which would undertake income-generating projects. At the end of 36 months, subscribers would receive one share of common voting stock and would be entitled to participate in yearly shareholders meetings. As William Downes, the treasurer of the 10-36 Plan and the executive director of ZNPCT explains, the idea of the voting system was to encourage community involvement in the plan."

In Sullivan's philosophy, to cultivate the idea of "giving before receiving", the community would need to help the non-profit side of the program. To see the 10-36 Plan as an investment, members of the community would need to understand basic economic concepts. Stockholders were warned not to expect immediate results from their investment. Their most immediate monetary benefit would be a tax deduction for their contributions to the nonprofit. In being a part of the Plan, stockholders and investors would need to trust the idea of making their money work for those that would come after them within their community. Rev. Sullivan's vision was to use the tools of the free enterprise system to foster something that is vital to community progress - a sense of ownership and a stake in the common good.

Funds accumulated rapidly under the 10-36 Plan, and were soon used to invest in numerous housing and economic development initiatives. In 1964, PIA made its first investment in an 8-unit apartment building in an all-white community. The rationale for buying this property was that it would help address a long-standing problem facing blacks - racial discrimination in housing. The leaders of the Progress Movement believed that money often has the power to speak louder than words in the struggle to improve race relations. One year after its first investment in housing, PIA built Zion Gardens, a middle-income garden apartment complex in North Philadelphia. The $1 million project was financed by using 10-36 funds to leverage a loan from the Federal Housing Administration and a grant from the United States Department of Housing and Urban Development (HUD).

While pursuing these development projects, Zion continued to build an equity base through the 10-36 Plan. In 1965, the plan was opened to new subscribers from Zion's congregation, and another 450 joined. Over the years, the Progress Movement has had great success with its strategy of using equity accumulated under the 10-36 Plan to leverage funds from public and private sources, including commercial banks and insurance companies.

== Progress Plaza ==
After establishing the OIC in the mid-1960s, Zion's next major undertaking was the fulfillment of Rev. Sullivan's dream of building the nation's first black-owned and developed shopping center, to be named "Progress Plaza". In addition to addressing his concern about the lack of black ownership of major businesses in America, the project would deal with the problem of unemployment in North Philadelphia by generating a substantial number of jobs. After convincing the city's Redevelopment Authority to donate land for the project, Sullivan set out to raise the capital needed to build the shopping center. "So I went to the chairman of the bank and I said, I want a construction loan", he recounts. "He said, well Reverend, you need some equity for something like this. Think about it and come back later in two, three or four years, and let's see what we can do." Sullivan was already prepared for that challenge, however. "Give me the sack", he told Zion's treasurer, William Downes. "I opened it up and $400,000 worth of equities came out", he describes. "The man's eye glasses fell off his eyes. He came around the table and took my hand and said, Reverend, we can work together." Sullivan's theory about the power of money to deal with persistent racial inequalities was proving to be correct. As he concludes:

I found that $400,000 makes a difference in race relations in America!

Progress Plaza, which is located on Broad Street, one of Philadelphia's main thoroughfares, was dedicated in 1968 before a crowd of 10,000 well-wishers. In some sense, the shopping center was the culmination of the Progress Movement's multiple goals. Because it was a major construction project, it created a large number of construction jobs for participants in the OIC program. Through an agreement negotiated with Progress Plaza's chain store tenants, the shopping center also made numerous management job opportunities available to African Americans. To fulfill another one of the Progress Movement's primary goals - to encourage the development of black-owned businesses - ZNPCT created an Entrepreneurial Training Center at Progress Plaza. With major funding from the Ford Foundation, the center was able to offer managerial and entrepreneurial skills training to hundreds of area residents. Today, over half of the 16 stores in Progress Plaza are black-owned businesses.

Another one of the Progress Movement's major goals was to address the social needs of North Philadelphia's community residents. To this end, ZNPCT built a comprehensive Human Services Center that centralizes essential services so that they are easily accessible to area residents. Zion's role was to develop the property and lease it at below-market rent to nonprofit and governmental entities whose programs fulfill ZNPCT's charitable mission. Located adjacent to Progress Plaza, the center currently houses a Social Security Administration office, an unemployment compensation office, a police training academy, and a health service center run by Temple University.

In the 1980s, Progress Plaza was taken over by Wendell Whitlock of Progress Investment Associates, who is now the chairman emeritus. In 2018, Progress Plaza celebrated its 50-year anniversary with commemorations from local politician Congressman Dwight Evans who was influenced by Sullivan's thinking in his book "Build, Brother, Build."

== Sullivan Principles as a response to apartheid ==
In 1971, Sullivan joined the General Motors Board of Directors and became the first African-American on the board of a major corporation. He went on to serve on General Motors' board for over 20 years. In 1977, Sullivan developed a code of conduct for companies operating in South Africa called the Sullivan Principles, as an alternative to complete disinvestment. As part of the board of directors at General Motors, Sullivan lobbied GM and other large corporations to voluntarily withdrawal from doing business in South Africa while the system of apartheid was still in effect.

In 1988, Sullivan retired from Zion Baptist Church. Sullivan was determined to provide a model of self-help and empowerment to the people of Africa. He began using his talent for bringing world leaders together to find solutions to international issues through the establishment of the International Foundation for Education and Self-Help (IFESH) in order to establish and maintain programs and activities in the areas of agriculture, business and economic development, democracy and governance, education and health. These programs would in turn help governments in sub-Saharan Africa reduce poverty and unemployment and build civil societies. To further expand human rights and economic development to all communities, Sullivan created the Global Sullivan Principles of Social Responsibility in 1997. In 1999, the Global Sullivan Principles were issued at the United Nations. This expanded code calls for multinational companies to take an active role in the advancement of human rights and social justice. Then United Nations Secretary-General Kofi Annan had this to say about Sullivan's contributions:

It shows how much one individual can do to change lives and societies for the better ... He was known and respected throughout the world for the bold and innovative role he played in the global campaign to dismantle the system of apartheid in South Africa.

== Leon H. Sullivan Summit ==
Sullivan organized the first Summit in Abidjan, Côte d'Ivoire in 1991 as a result of a number of requests and conversations he had with African leaders seeking an honest dialog among and between leaders of African countries and government officials and leaders from developed countries. Since then, the biennial Leon H. Sullivan Summit has brought together the world's political and business leaders, delegates representing national and international civil and multinational organizations, and members of academic institutions in order to focus attention and resources on Africa's economic and social development. Their mission was inspired by Rev. Leon H. Sullivan's belief that the development of Africa is a matter of global partnerships. It was particularly important to Rev. Sullivan that Africa's Diaspora and Friends of Africa are active participants in Africa's development.

The Leon H Sullivan Summit is now organized by the Leon H Sullivan Foundation, an organization dedicated to expanding Leon Sullivan's vision of empowering the underprivileged, which is headed by Leon Sullivan's daughter Hope Masters.

== Awards and honors ==
Sullivan was the recipient of the following awards:

- The Ten Outstanding Young Americans Award, 1955
- The Afro-American Achievement Award, 1956
- The Freedom Foundation Award, 1960
- Life Magazine cited Sullivan as one of the 100 outstanding young adults in the United States, 1963
- The Russwurm Award, 1963
- The Philadelphia Bok Award, 1966
- The William Penn Award, 1967
- The Edwin T. Dahlberg Peace Award, 1968
- The Spingarn Award by the NAACP, 1971
- The Silver Buffalo Award by the Boy Scouts of America, 1971
- The Award for Greatest Public Service Benefiting the Disadvantaged, an award given out annually by Jefferson Awards, 1975.
- William L. Dawson Award (Phoenix Award), 1977
- The Common Wealth Award of Distinguished Service, 1986
- The Four Freedoms Award by the Roosevelt Institute, 1987
- The Presidential Medal of Freedom, the highest civilian award that the American government can give, by President George H. W. Bush, 1991
- Harold Washington Award, (Phoenix Award), 1993
- The Bishop John T. Walker Distinguished Humanitarian Service Award by Africare, 1995
- The Eleanor Roosevelt Award for Human Rights by President Bill Clinton, 1999
- In August 2000, Charleston, West Virginia city leaders changed the name of Broad Street, near his boyhood home, to Leon Sullivan Way.
- The Reverend Dr. Leon H. Sullivan International Arrivals Hall in Terminal A of Philadelphia International Airport was named in his honor in 2022.

During his lifetime he was also awarded honorary doctorate degrees from over 50 colleges and universities and served as a board member of General Motors, Mellon Bank and the Boy Scouts of America.

== Books by Leon H. Sullivan ==
- America is theirs: And other poems (1948)
- Build Brother Build (1969)
- Alternatives to Despair (1972)
- Philosophy of a Giant (1979)
- Moving Mountains: The Principles and Purposes of Leon Sullivan (1998)
