= Opportunities Industrialization Center =

Nonprofit adult education and job training organization

- Type: Nonprofit
- Industry: Education
- Founded: January 26, 1964; 62 years ago in Philadelphia, Pennsylvania, United States
- Founder: Leon Sullivan
- Headquarters: Philadelphia, Pennsylvania, United States
- Number of locations: 26 (United States)
- Area served: United States
- Key people: Louis J. King II (President/CEO)
- Services: Science, technology, engineering, and mathematics education Job training Workforce development
- Website: www.oicofamerica.org

Opportunities Industrialization Center (usually shortened to “OIC” and doing business as OIC of America, Inc. and OIC International, Inc.) is a nonprofit adult education and job training organization headquartered in Philadelphia, Pennsylvania, with affiliates located in 15 U.S. states.

Founded in 1964, OIC of America positions the workers of today, tomorrow, and the future to harness their economic power into political power. With the right training and tools, historically oppressed people can use their talent to have the strongest influence on policy and cultural change.

Louis J. King II, President and CEO of OIC Philadelphia since 2022, has more than 30 years’ experience in education, youth and workforce development. In January 2022, King was hired as President & CEO of OIC of America (OICA), which include 27 affiliates in 16 states. He conceived and is leading a transformation of the OIC network, centered around establishing the Sullivan Training Network: CTE training for forgotten people in forgotten places. This new OICA endeavor will lead to economic power and freedom for low-income people nationwide and serve as a solution to America’s labor crisis. Prior to assuming the role of CEO of OIC of America, King was CEO of Summit Academy OIC since its founding in 1996. He grew Summit from a small, two-person shop to a $15 million/year powerhouse delivering education and career training to more than 1,000 adults annually. King was also the key driver behind the Northside STEM District in the Twin Cities, an initiative designed to create a K-12 pipeline into STEM careers via early exposure and multi-leveled community involvement. He has added STEM programming to the OICA portfolio and is expanding STEM education and career pathways throughout the OICA network.

== Programs ==
As of 2018, OIC website stated it operated "over 30 affiliated centers, 22 in the US and 20 international centers in Africa, Haiti and Poland". A November 1999 article in the New York Times stated it operated "70 branches nationwide and 46 in 18 other countries." The 2021 website of OIC America listed five programs:

- Vocational training – "a core element of OIC's mission"; for both unemployed and those who have a job and want a better one; "helps lower-skilled workers learn new skills and earn industry-recognized credentials".
- Work readiness – "effective communication, problem solving, resume building, interviewing, and job search skills".
- SOAR (skills and opportunities for achievement and responsibility) program to reintegrate into society people released from prison and prevent recidivism. Provides "relationship development to intensive case management, academic support, vocational training and credentialing, job placement, and long-term follow-up services". A "structured, yet holistic approach".
- Education – offers "adult basic education, GED preparation and/or testing services" for students such as " over-age, under-credentialed students" who never got a high school diploma but need GED for a job or further training.
- Youth development – "engaging" youth "to recognize, utilize, and enhance their strengths."
- Healthcare – OIC offers vocational training in employment areas such as certified nursing assistant, but also offers "comprehensive, affordable, healthcare".

Its affiliates usually have OIC in the name, such as "Summit Academy OIC", "American Indian OIC".

== History ==
=== Origins ===
OIC was founded in 1964, by Leon Sullivan, a civil rights leader and pastor of the Zion Baptist Church in Philadelphia with an education and job training facility to help African Americans. Its first facility was a converted former jailhouse on 19th and Oxford Streets in North Philadelphia. The program was developed to provide job training and instruction in life skills to disadvantaged and disenfranchised peoples with few prospects, and helped place participants into the workforce. Sullivan discovered that thousands of African Americans and other Philadelphia residents in lower-income communities were unemployed, despite a surplus in job vacancies during that time. This led to the launch of a "selective patronage" campaign, i.e. a boycott against Philadelphia-area companies that were not practicing equal opportunity in employment.

Expansion

Renovations to the dilapidated building were funded through donations from community organizers and citizens, and through a grant given by an anonymous donor. The programs provided by the Philadelphia center were replicated in other American cities, which provided employment training and job placement for economically disadvantaged, unemployed and unskilled people of all races. In 1969, Sullivan's concept led to the formation of the Opportunities Industrialization Centers International (OICI), which would expand its services to international communities based on the "self-help" philosophy that Sullivan founded OIC upon. In 1970, Sullivan established OIC of America, Inc. to serve as a national organization that would associated with OIC affiliate campuses across the United States and provide technical assistance centers for areas where the OIC model was replicated.

=== Programs in Africa ===
Although OIC does not serve Black people exclusively, its history as part of the civil rights protests of the 1960s and a boycott to help desegregate white businesses in Philadelphia, was continued in the 1970s with a Pan-African effort to help establish facilities in several African countries, "with the collective cultural capital and philanthropy raised by the people themselves in Nigeria, Ghana, Ethiopia, Kenya, and other nations".
