= Mary Hatwood Futrell =

American educator

- Born: Mary Alice Franklin Hatwood; May 24, 1940 (age 86); Altavista, Virginia
- Education: Virginia State College, 1962, BA; George Washington University, 1968, MA; 1992, Ed.D.
- Occupations: Educator and professor
- Years active: 1962–
- Employer: George Washington University
- Organization: National Education Association
- Spouse: Donald Futrell

Mary Hatwood Futrell (born May 24, 1940) is an American educator, professor, and pioneer in women's rights education. In her six-year-term as president of the National Education Association, she worked to advocate for students in poorer and lower-achieving schools.

== Early life ==
Mary Alice Franklin Hatwood was born on 24 May 1940 in Altavista, Virginia. After her father, a construction worker, died when she was four, she and her three sisters were raised in relative poverty by a single mother, Josephine Hatwood Austin, who worked in a factory and as a domestic. By the time she was eight, Hatwood was joining her mother work "dusting church pews and offices." A few years later, she worked during her summers as a babysitter and housekeeper at the beach. Even though Josephine only had a sixth grade education herself, she was very involved in her daughters' educations.

Hatwood attended segregated Lynchburg before transferring to Dunbar High School, where she was a cheerleader and participated in the student government, Future Business Leaders of America, and the National Honor Society. Though her teachers knew she was bright, Hatwood was put into the vocational track as they knew her family would be unable to afford to send her to college. However, due to her academic success, Hatwood was switched to the more rigorous college-track program. Upon graduating from high school, her teachers, who had collected money from local businesses, churches, and sororities, presented her with a "scholarship" of $1,500 for college. She completed her BA from Virginia State College, where she majored in business, in 1962 and MA from George Washington University in 1968. Later, she attended the University of Maryland, University of Virginia, and Virginia Polytechnic Institute for further education.

== Career ==
Hatwood started her career as a high school teacher and worked as a business education teacher at the all-black Parker Gray High School, Alexandria, Virginia between 1962 and 1964. She then worked as a business teacher at George Washington High School (Alexandria, Virginia), where she worked to integrate the faculty and condemn the lingering racism among school community members.

In 1967, Hatwood joined the Virginia Education Association. She was blocked from joining the board by her school district, who refused to distribute her campaign literature. After successfully challenging the district in court, she became the president of the Education Association of Alexandria in 1973. In 1976, she ran for president of the VEA, becoming the first African American to hold the position. Around this time, she married Donald Futrell, a coach and physical education teacher with two children from a previous marriage, and took a leave of absence from teaching.

In 1978, Futrell joined the board of directors of the National Education Association. In 1980, Futrell was elected secretary–treasurer and later elected as its president in 1983, and continued to serve the organization until 1989, becoming the longest-reigning president in the organization's history.

During her tenure, she worked to lower the student dropout rate by increasing the use of technology in the classroom and supporting families of children. She worked to fight the impression that organizations like the NEA protected the jobs of teachers at the cost of students. Futrell was also instrumental in the NEA's collaboration with the American Federation of Teachers, forming the National Board for Professional Teaching Standards. Under her leadership, the NEA increased in size from 1.6 to 2 million members. In 1983, People named her "one of the most powerful Black women in America." The National Education Association later established an award in her honor.

After earning her Doctor of Education from George Washington University in 1992, she joined the school faculty member and in 1995 became the dean of the Graduate School of Education and Human Development. Under her leadership, the program was consistently rated among the top American graduate schools for education.

In 1993, Futrell became the founding president of Education International. In 2005, Education International established an annual award in her honor.

== Awards ==
- American Black Achievement Award, 1984
- Distinguished Service Medal (Columbia University), 1987
- Phoenix Award (Congressional Black Caucus Foundation), 1992
- Jan Amos Comenius Medal (UNESCO), 2004
- Named President of Americans for UNESCO, 2010
- John Hope Franklin Award ( Diverse: Issues in Higher Education), 2013
- Over 20 honorary degrees, including Virginia State University; George Washington University (1984); Spelman College (1986); Central State University; Eastern Michigan University (1987); Adrian College
