= National Commission on Teaching and America's Future =

Non-profit organization

The National Commission on Teaching and America's Future (NCTAF) is a non-profit, non-partisan education policy advocacy organization based in Washington, D.C. Founded in 1994 by then-North Carolina governor Jim Hunt and Stanford University professor Linda Darling-Hammond, the NCTAF focuses its research on improving the teaching profession through recruitment, development, and retention of skilled teachers. In 2017, the NCTAF announced that it will merge with Learning Forward and will operate under the Learning Forward name.

== Background ==
In its 1996 report "What Matters Most: Teaching for America's Future," the NCTAF issued broad recommendations for education leaders and state policymakers to, among other things, overhaul teacher education programs, establish state boards of professional teaching standards, strengthen teacher licensure standards, implement teacher mentoring programs, and create teacher compensation policies that reward knowledge and expertise. The report had wide-reaching impact, with seven states, including Illinois, Indiana, Kentucky, Maine, Missouri, North Carolina, and Ohio, signing on to be partners in implementing the report's recommendations.

In 2001, the NCTAF appointed former US federal education official Tom Carrol its executive director. Carroll announced his retirement in 2014. He was succeeded by Melinda George.
