= Adelaide L. Sanford =

American educator and advocate (born 1925)

Adelaide Luvenia Sanford
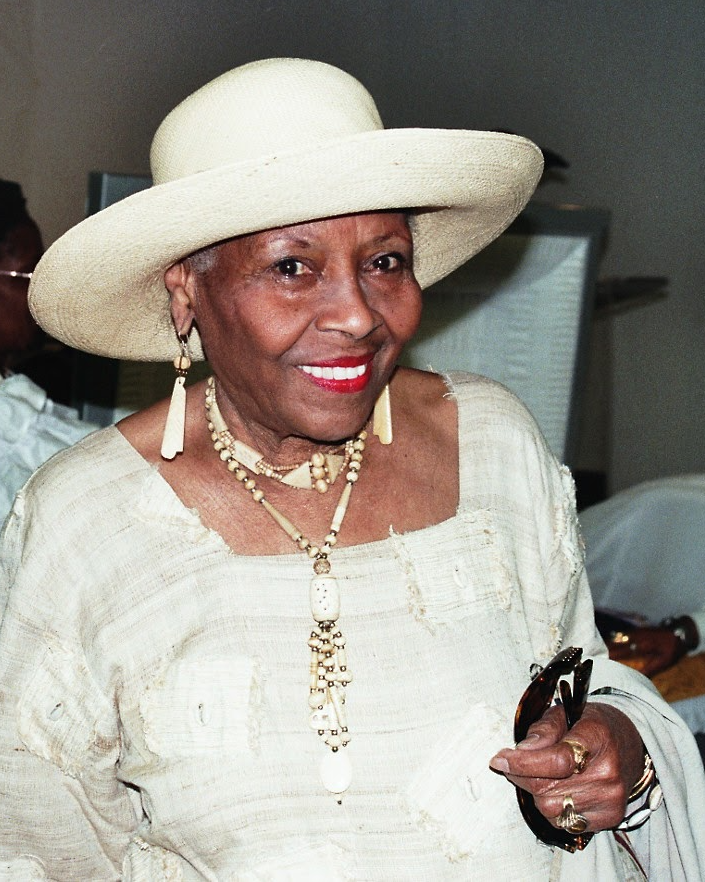
- Born: November 27, 1925 (age 100); New York City, U.S.
- Education: Brooklyn College (B.Ed.); Wellesley College (M.Ed.); Fordham University (Ph.D.)
- Occupations: Educator, education activist, public speaker

Adelaide Luvenia Sanford (born November 27, 1925) is an American activist administrator, public speaker and national advocate for African-centered education for students of African descent. She served on the Board of Regents of the University of the State of New York from 1986 to 2007.

Sanford is the founder of the Board of Education of People of African Ancestry, and was instrumental in its development and growth. She taught education courses at Baruch College, and at Fordham University.

== Career ==
Sanford attended Brooklyn College, graduating in 1947 with a bachelor's degree in education. She earned her master's in education at Wellesley College, graduating in 1950. She earned her Ph.D. in 1967 from Fordham University.

Her teaching career started at P.S. 28 in Bedford–Stuyvesant, Brooklyn. She has been a teacher, assistant principal, and principal at P.S. 21 Crispus Attucks School in Brooklyn, New York. She played an instrumental role in the development of Crispus Attucks School along with Renee Young, Harold Anderson, and Alice Uzoaga.

Sanford taught education courses at Baruch College, Mercy College (New York) and Fordham University in New York City. She was a visiting education practitioner and teaching fellow at the Principals' Center at Harvard University, Graduate School of Education. She has been a consultant for the boards of education in Niagara Falls, Connecticut, Indiana, and New Jersey. She has served on advisory committees for multicultural education for the National Associate of State Boards of Education. She has also served on the board of the Upper Manhattan Empowerment Zone.

In 1986 she became Member-At-Large for the Board of Regents of the State of New York. She was re-elected for a second term in 1993, and again in 2000 for a five-year term. In 2001 Adelaide was elected as Vice Chancellor of the Board of Regents.

In 1990 Adelaide founded the Board for The Education Of People Of African Ancestry (BEPAA), an organization that provides programs and services for students, parents and educators. When explaining her rationale for founding BEPAA, she said, "There was a Jewish Board, a Catholic Board, all these Boards—yet nothing to represent and stand for us. It had to be done."

Adelaide Sanford and her late husband, Dr. Jay Sanford, were organizers for the creation of the John Henrik Clarke House in Harlem and Elders House in Selma, Alabama. She is the founder of the Sanford and Hines Families Award for Study and Research in the African Experience in New York State, the Americas and the Diaspora, which was started in 2011. The first recipient of the award was Mandingo Tshaka in 2011.

=== Adelaide L. Sanford Institute ===
In 2006, over 1000 community leaders, educators, and residents in Central Brooklyn came together for a Black Brooklyn Empowerment Convention. The convention was held to address community issues related to education, employment, health, housing, and quality of life issues in Central Brooklyn. School and education disparities were a core concern at the convention. A recommendation to formulate an organization around this concern grew out of the meeting with the creation of the Adelaide Sanford Institute to honor Adelaide Sanford.

In 2012, the Adelaide L. Sanford Institute (ASI) started community-round table discussions in Central Brooklyn. The goal of the round-table discussions was to provide community based organizations, elected officials, parents, clergy, and community leaders with a forum for discussions and strategies around State Standards in New York City public schools.

== Personal life ==
Adelaide and Jay Sanford were married for 56 years. He died in 2011.

== Awards ==
- Congressional Black Caucus Foundation's George Thomas "Mickey" Leland Humanitarian Award
- Distinguished alumna award from Brooklyn College
- Distinguished alumna award from Wellesley College
- Josephine Shaw Lowell Award
- Ellen Lurie Award
- Honored in 2014 State of New York Resolution - Achievement Award
- Lifetime Achievement Award

== Honorary doctorate degrees ==
- Mercy College
- The Bank Street College of Education
- Five Towns College
- St. John's University
