= Phoenix Award (Congressional Black Caucus Foundation) =

American award for societal contributions

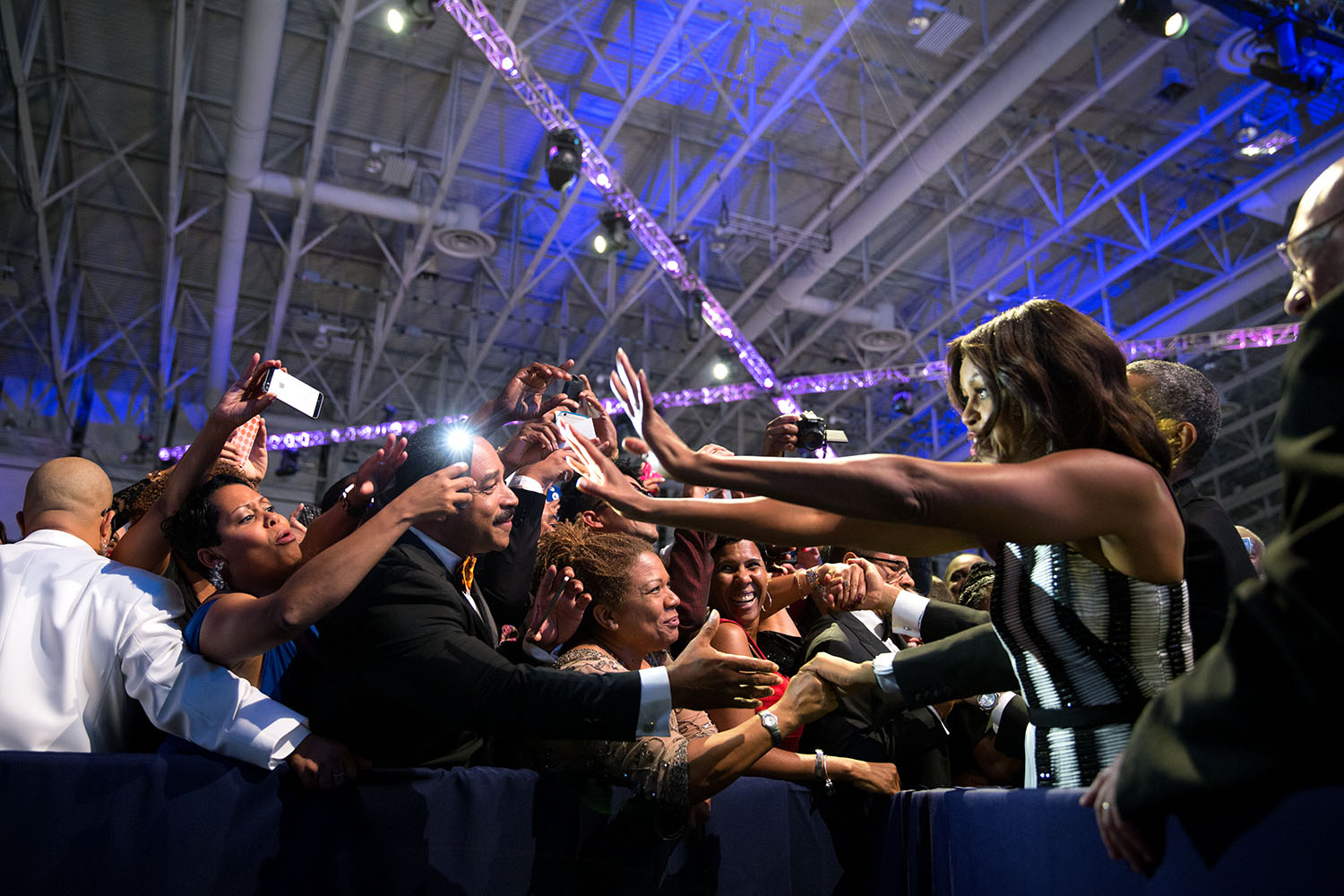
President Barack Obama and First Lady Michelle Obama greet audience members during the Congressional Black Caucus Foundation's 44th Annual Legislative Conference Phoenix Awards Dinner at the Walter E. Washington Convention Center in Washington, D.C., Saturday, Sept. 27, 2014.

The Phoenix Awards are conferred by the Congressional Black Caucus Foundation. This annual event recognizes individuals who have made significant contributions to society, while uplifting and empowering the global Black community. The Phoenix Awards are the apex of the Annual Legislative Conference. It is also the primary fundraising event for the CBCF. They are streamed on BET and BET Her.

== Awards ==
Specific awards given out as a part of the Phoenix Awards include:

- ALC Co-Chair's Award (ALC Co-Chair's Phoenix Award): "exemplifies corporate leadership and social responsibility on a national level"
- Barbara Jordan Award
- CBC Chair's Award (Congressional Black Caucus Chair's Phoenix Award): "presented each year to an individual who exhibits the highest standards of dedication, ability and creativity"
- CBC Co-Chair's Award (Congressional Black Caucus Co-Chair's Phoenix Award)
- CBC Body Award
- CBCF Chair's Award: "honors an individual whose work and accomplishments stand as a role model for the African-American community"
- Congressional Black Caucus Founder's Award
- John Lewis Legacy Award
- Lifetime Achievement Award
- Trailblazer Award: "recognizes a leader who is the first, in his or her chosen field, to make a global or national groundbreaking achievement and whose vision, perseverance and lifework has created opportunities for African Americans and minorities."
- Millennium Award: only given out in 2000
- CBC Member's Awards:
  - George Collins Award: "presented to an individual whose community service exemplifies the dedication and work style of the late congressman George W. Collins."
  - William L. Dawson Award: "presented... to an individual who has made significant research, organizational, and leadership contributions in the development of legislation that addresses the needs of minorities in the United States"
  - Charles C. Diggs Award for foreign affairs
  - George Thomas "Mickey" Leland Award (Humanitarian Award): "presented to a person displaying exceptional compassion and great commitment to championing the causes of the poor, underprivileged and the oppressed."
  - Ralph Metcalfe Award for Health: "presented to an individual or group that has excelled in providing extraordinary contributions to improve the health and wellbeing of African Americans"
  - Adam Clayton Powell Jr Award: "for outstanding contributions to the political awareness and empowerment of African Americans"
  - Harold Washington Award (Harold Washington Phoenix Award): "presented to an individual who has contributed immeasurably to African American political awareness, empowerment and the advancement of minorities in the electoral process."
- Congressional Black Caucus Foundation's Culture Icon Award
- Mission in Action Award
- Body Award

== Winners ==
Year	Awardee	Award	Reference
1972	A. Philip Randolph	Adam Clayton Powell Award	
1973	Clarence Mitchell Jr.	Adam Clayton Powell Award	
1973	E. Z. Jackson	George Collins Award	
1974	Dorothy Height	William L. Dawson Award	
1975	George L. Brown	Adam Clayton Powell Award	
1975	Kenneth Clark (doll test)	William L. Dawson Award	
1975	Mound Bayou Community Hospital	George Collins Award	
1977	Richard G. Hatcher	Adam Clayton Powell Award	
1977	Leon Sullivan	William L. Dawson Award	
1978	Andrew Young	Adam Clayton Powell Award	
1978	Augustus Hawkins	William L. Dawson Award	
1978	Bishop Elisha P. Murchinson Sr.; Dr. Joseph H. Jackson; Bishop Charles Golden; Rev. Thomas Kilgore; Rev. Dr. J. Oscar McCloud; Bishop Joseph O. Patterson; Dr. Joseph Evans; Bishop H. Thomas Primm; Dr. T.C. Sams; Bishop Herbert Bell Shaw; Right Rev. John T. Walker; Bishop Smallwood Williams	George Collins Award	
1979	Kent B. Amos, Abraham S. Venable, LeBaron Taylor	CBC Chair's Award	
1979	Edward Brooke	Adam Clayton Powell Award	
1979	Parren Mitchell	William L. Dawson Award	
1979	Sugar Ray Robinson	George Collins Award	
1980	Charles Diggs	CBC Chair's Award	
1980	H. Claude Hudson	Adam Clayton Powell Award	
1980	Louis Stokes	William L. Dawson Award	
1980	Sugar Ray Leonard	George Collins Award	
1981	Jesse Jackson and Joseph Lowery	CBC Chair's Award	
1981	Eddie Williams (activist)	Adam Clayton Powell Award	
1981	Robert McGlotten	William L. Dawson Award	
1981	Marva Collins	George Collins Award	
1982	Coleman Young	Adam Clayton Powell Award	
1982	Percy Sutton	Humanitarian Award	
1982	Shirley Chisholm	William L. Dawson Award	
1982	J. Lamar Hill	George Collins Award	
1983	Harold Washington	Adam Clayton Powell Award	
1983	Steve Pruitt	William L. Dawson Award	
1983	Julius Erving	George Collins Award	
1984	Jesse Jackson	Adam Clayton Powell Award	
1984	Lacy Clay	William L. Dawson Award	
1984	Tennessee Valley Center, Inc., Percy H. Harvey, Maxine Waters	George Collins Award	
1985	Marion Barry, Bill Cosby, LeBaron Taylor	CBCF Chair's Award	
1985	Harry Belafonte, Bob Geldof, Ted Koppell	CBC Chair's Award	
1985	Gilbert W. Lindsay	Adam Clayton Powell Award	
1985	Travers H.J. Bell	William L. Dawson Award	
1985	Marion "Rex" Harris	George Collins Award	
1986	Parren Mitchell	Adam Clayton Powell Award	
1986	Charles Rangel	William L. Dawson Award	
1986	Dorothy Height	George Collins Award	
1987	Douglas Wilder	Adam Clayton Powell Award	
1987	Adelaide Sanford	George Thomas "Mickey" Leland Award	
1987	Marian Wright Edelman	William L. Dawson Award	
1987	Milton Carroll	George Collins Award	
1988	David Dinkins	Adam Clayton Powell Award	
1988	Jesse Jackson	Harold Washington Award	
1988	Arthur Hill	William L. Dawson Award	
1988	Doug Williams (quarterback)	George Collins Award	
1989	William Gray	Adam Clayton Powell Award	
1989	Ron Brown	Harold Washington Award	
1989	Augustus Hawkins	William L. Dawson Award	
1989	John Thompson (basketball)	George Collins Award	
1990	Fannie Lou Hamer, Kent Amost, Christopher Edley Sr., Chief Bashorun, Moshood Abiola, Naythaniel Everett	CBCF Chair's Award	
1990	Willie Brown (politician)	Adam Clayton Powell Award	
1990	Douglas Wilder	Harold Washington Award	
1990	Cardiss Collins	William L. Dawson Award	
1990	Clara Hale	George Collins Award	
1991	Dan Blue	Adam Clayton Powell Award	
1991	Sharon Pratt Dixon	Harold Washington Award	
1991	Henry Kirksey	William L. Dawson Award	
1991	Bill Cosby and Camille Cosby	George Thomas "Mickey" Leland Award	
1991	Christopher Edley Sr.	George Collins Award	
1991	Thurgood Marshall	CBC Lifetime Achievement Award	
1992	Benjamin Hooks	Adam Clayton Powell Award	
1992	Jackie Joyner-Kersee	George Thomas "Mickey" Leland Award	
1992	Lane Kirkland	Harold Washington	
1992	Mary Hatwood Futrell	William L. Dawson Award	
1992	Magic Johnson	George Collins Award	
1992	Benjamin O. Davis Jr.	CBC Lifetime Achievement Award	
1993	Bill Clay	CBCF Chair's Award	
1993	Lani Guinier and Arsenio Hall	CBC Chair's Award	
1993	Maxine Waters	Adam Clayton Powell Award	
1993	Arthur Ashe	George Thomas "Mickey" Leland Award	
1993	Leon Sullivan	Harold Washington Award	
1993	Benjamin Chavis	William L. Dawson Award	
1993	Dick Gregory	George Collins Award	
1993	Berry Gordy	CBC Lifetime Achievement Award	
1995	Muhammad Ali	Harold Washington Award	
1995	Colin Powell	George "Mickey" Leland Award	
1996	Toni Fay and Ingrid Saunders Jones	CBCF Chair's Award	
1996	Mary Frances Berry	CBC Chair's Award	
1996	John Conyers	Adam Clayton Award	
1996	Donald Payne Jr.	George Thomas "Mickey" Leland Award	
1996	Andrew Young	Harold Washington Award	
1996	Wade Henderson	William L. Dawson Award	
1996	Elaine Jones	George Collins Award	
1997	William Brooks	CBCF Chair's Award	
1997	Myrlie Evers-Williams, Coretta Scott King, Betty Shabazz	CBC Chair's Award	
1997	John Hope Franklin	ALC Chairs' Award	
1997	Major Owens	Adam Clayton Powel Award	
1997	Eva Clayton	George Thomas "Mickey" Leland Award	
1997	Jason Charles	Youth Community Service Award	
1997	William Lucy (labor leader)	Harold Washington Award	
1997	Laura Murphy	William L. Dawson Award	
1997	Danny Bakewell	George Collins Award	
1998	Daniel Godfrey and Alice Balance	CBCF Chair's Award	
1998	Franklin Raines	ALC Chairs' Award	
1998	Charles Diggs	Adam Clayton Powell Award	
1998	Ossie Davis and Ruby Dee	George Thomas "Mickey" Leland Award	
1998	Bobby Rush	Harold Washington Award	
1998	Alexis Herman	William L. Dawson Award	
1998	Rodney E. Slater	George Collins Award	
1999	Alvin Brown	CBC Chair's Award	
1999	Julius L. Chambers	Adam Clayton Powell Award	
1999	Tom Joyner	George Thomas "Mickey" Leland Award	
1999	Evelyn J. Fields	Ralph Metcalfe Award	
2000	LeBaron Taylor	CBCF Chair's Award	
2000	William Kennard	CBC Chair's Award	
2000	Nelson Mandela	Millennium Award	
2000	Arthur Eve	Adam Clayton Powell Award	
2000	Rodney Carroll	George Thomas "Mickey" Leland Award	
2000	Tavis Smiley and Tom Joyner	Harold Washington Award	
2000	Kenneth Hill	William L. Dawson Award	
2001	Noah Samara	CBCF Chair's Award	
2001	Bill Clinton	CBC Chair's Award	
2001	Robert G. Clark	ALC Chairs' Award	
2001	Mel Foote	Diggs Award	
2001	David Satcher	Ralph Metcalfe Award	
2001	H. Carl McCall	William L. Dawson Award	
2002	Kenneth Chenault; Richard Parsons (businessman)	CBCF Chair's Award	
2002	Emmitt Smith	CBC Chair's Award	
2002	Festus Mogae	ALC Chairs' Award	
2002	Julian Dixon	Adam Clayton Powell Award	
2002	Carrie Meek	George Thomas "Mickey" Leland Award	
2002	Donna Brazile	Harold Washington Award	
2002	H. Carl McCall	William L. Dawson Award	
2003	Robert Johnson	CBCF Chair's Award	
2003	Jim Clyburn	CBC Chair's Award	
2003	Hugh Price	William L. Dawson Award	
2003	Ben Carson	Ralph Metcalfe Award	
2003	Charles Rangel	Lifetime Distinguished Service Award	
2003	John Conyers	Lifetime Distinguished Service Award	
2003	Eddie Bernice Johnson	Barbara Jordan Award	
2003	Marian Wright Edelman	ALC Chairs' Award	
2004	Ruth Simmons	CBCF Chair's Award	
2004	H. Patrick Swygert	CBC Chair's Award	
2004	Danny H. Cameron	ALC Chairs' Award	
2004	Tommy W. Dortch Jr.	ALC Chairs' Award	
2005	John H. Johnson	ALC Chairs' Award	
2005	Debra L. Lee	CBC Chair's Award	
2005	P. J. Patterson	Charles Diggs	
2005	Ndi Okereke-Onyiuke	Barbara Jordan Award	
2005	Hurricane Katrina Heroes	Katrina Heroes Award	
2006	Charles Ogletree	CBCF Chair's Award	
2006	Johnnetta Cole	CBC Chair's Award	
2006	Kwame Kilpatrick	ALC Co-Chair's Award	
2006	Ron Dellums	ALC Co-Chair's Award	
2006	Roscoe C. Brown Jr.	William L. Dawson Award	
2006	Kim Bondy	George Thomas "Mickey" Leland Award	
2007	William H. Gray III	CBCF Chair's Award	
2007	Anna Diggs Taylor	CBC Chair's Award	
2007	Jim Clyburn	ALC Co-Chair's Award	
2007	Kofi Annan	Members' Award	
2007	Rutgers Scarlet Knights	Members' Award	
2008	Kerry Washington	CBCF Chair's Award	
2008	Eleanor Josaitis	CBC Chair's Award	
2008	Deval Patrick	ALC Co-Chair's Award	
2008	David Paterson	ALC Co-Chair's Award	
2008	Karen Bass	CBC Members' Award	
2008	Barack Obama	CBC Members' Award	
2009	Calvin Smyre	CBCF Chair's Award	
2009	Danny Glover	CBC Chair's Award	
2009	Cicely Tyson	ALC Co-Chairs' Award	
2009	Sheryl Lee Ralph	ALC Co-Chairs' Award	
2009	Susan Rice	Charles C. Diggs Award	
2009	Ted Kennedy	George Thomas "Mickey" Leland Award	
2009	Wyclef Jean	George Collins Award	
2010	Sheila Oliver	CBCF Chair's Award	
2010	Judith Jamison	CBC Chair's Award	
2010	Simeon Booker	George Thomas "Mickey" Leland Award	
2010	Harry Belafonte	George Thomas "Mickey" Leland Award	
2011	John Lewis	CBCF Chair's Award	
2011	Lisa P. Jackson	CBC Chair's Award	
2011	George Foreman	ALC Co-Chairs' Award	
2011	Joseph Lowery	Members' Award	
2012	Eric Holder	CBCF Chair's Award	
2012	George Lucas for Red Tails	CBC Chair's Award	
2012	Harvey Gantt	Harold Washington Award	
2012	Corrine Brown	Harold Washington Award	
2013	Bill Clinton	CBCF Chair's Award	
2013	Elaine Jones	CBC Chair's Award	
2013	"The Spirit of 1963"	ALC Co-Chairs' Award	
2013	Elijah Cummings	Harold Washington Award	
2014	Cathy Hughes	Congressional Black Caucus Chair's Award	
2014	Muhammad Ali	Ralph Metcalf Award for Health	
2014	Susan L. Taylor	ALC Co-Chair's Phoenix Award	
2014	Wade Henderson	CBC Chair's Award	
2014	Dr. Robert Wright	ALC Co-Chair's Phoenix Award	
2015	William Barber II	CBC Chair's Award	
2015	Fred Gray (attorney)	ALC Co-Chair's Award	
2015	Juanita Abernathy	George Thomas "Mickey" Leland Award	
2015	Amelia Boynton Robinson	Harold Washington Award	
2015	Alpha Phi Alpha	CBCF Chair's Award	
2016	Hillary Clinton	Trailblazer Award	
2016	Charles Rangel	Congressional Black Caucus Founder's Award	
2016	Marcia Fudge	Barbara Jordan Award	
2016	Robert F. Smith (investor)	CBCF Chair's Award	
2016	Emanuel African Methodist Episcopal Church in honor of the Emanuel Nine	CBC Chair's Award	
2017	Ruby Bridges	Congressional Black Caucus Chair's Phoenix Award	
2017	Thomas Freeman (debate coach)	Congressional Black Caucus Chair's Phoenix Award	
2017	Ron Kirk	Congressional Black Caucus Co-Chair's Phoenix Award	
2017	Tamika Mallory	Congressional Black Caucus Co-Chair's Phoenix Award	
2017	Bennie Thompson	Harold Washington Phoenix Award	
2018	Jesse Jackson and Jacqueline Brown	CBCF Chair & Lifetime Achievement Award	
2018	Tommie Smith and John Carlos	CBC Chair's Award	
2018	Lee Porter	ALC Co-Chairs' Award	
2018	Bryan Stevenson	ALC Co-Chairs' Award	
2018	Stacey Abrams	Adam Clayton Powell Award	
2018	Aretha Franklin	John Lewis Legacy Award	
2019	Calvin Mackie	CBCF Chair's Award	
2019	Wanda Austin	CBC Chair's Phoenix Award	
2019	The Exonerated Five	ALC Co-Chair's Phoenix Award	
2019	Barbara Lee	ALC Co-Chair's Phoenix Award	
2019	Al Sharpton	Harold Washington Award	
2020	Lonnie Bunch	Phoenix Award	
2020	William "Larry" Lucas	Phoenix Award	
2020	Eddie Bernice Johnson	Phoenix Award	
2020	Benjamin Crump	Phoenix Award	
2020	Joe Biden	Phoenix Award	
2021	Stacey Abrams	CBC Body Awardee	
2021	Lloyd Austin	Co-Chair's Award	
2021	Dr. Joan Coker	Co-Chair's Award	
2021	Marcia Fudge	CBC Chair's Award	
2021	Cedric Richmond	CBCF Chair's Award	
2022	Michael Eric Dyson	CBC Chair's Phoenix Award	
2022	Lisa D. Cook	CBCF Chair's Award	
2022	Opal Lee	CBC Body Award	
2022	Bennie Thompson	Democracy Trailblazer Award	
2022	Ruth E. Carter	Honorary Co-Chairs Award	
2023	Karine Jean-Pierre	Honorary Co-Chairs Award	
2023	Karen Bass	CBCF Chair's Award	
2023	Hakeem Jeffries	CBC Body Award	
2023	Justin Jones (Tennessee politician)	CBC Chair's Phoenix Award	
2023	MC Lyte and LL Cool J	CBCF's Culture Icon Award	
2024	Joe Biden	Lifetime Achievement Award	
2024	Wes Moore	CBC's Annual Legislative Conference Honorary Co-Chairs' Award	
2024	Sheila Jackson Lee	CBC's Body Award	
2024	Carla Hayden	CBCF Chair's Award	
2024	Jaime Harrison	Mission In Action Award	
