= Linda Darling-Hammond =

American academic

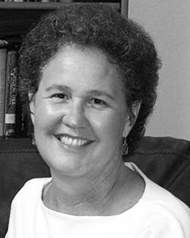

President of the California State Board of Education
- Incumbent
- Assumed office February 12, 2019
- Preceded by: Michael Kirst

Personal details
- Born: December 21, 1951 (age 74) Cleveland, Ohio, U.S.
- Party: Democratic
- Education: Yale University (BA); Temple University (MA, EdD)
- Awards: Yidan Prize for Education Research (2022)

Linda Darling-Hammond (December 21, 1951) is an American academic who is the Charles E. Ducommun Professor of Education Emeritus at the Stanford Graduate School of Education. She was also the president and CEO of the Learning Policy Institute. She is author or editor of more than 25 books and more than 500 articles on education policy and practice. Her work focuses on school restructuring, teacher education, and educational equity. She was education advisor to Barack Obama's 2008 presidential campaign and was reportedly among candidates for United States Secretary of Education in the Obama administration.

== Education ==
Darling-Hammond was born in Cleveland, Ohio. Darling-Hammond received her B.A. magna cum laude at Yale University in 1973, and an Ed.D. (Doctor of Education), with highest distinction, in urban education at Temple University in 1978.

== Career ==
Darling-Hammond began her career as a public school teacher in Pennsylvania, from 1973 to 1974.

In 1985, after completing her doctorate degree program, she began working as a social scientist for the RAND Corporation. Darling-Hammond was a senior social scientist and director of the RAND Education and Human Resources Program when she departed for academia in 1989. From 1989 to 1998, Darling-Hammond was a professor of education at Teachers College, Columbia University. She came to Stanford in 1998. In September 2015, Darling-Hammond launched the Learning Policy Institute, a research and policy think tank, with headquarters in Palo Alto, California, and an office in Washington, D.C. She served as president and chief executive officer until 2025. In 2019, California Governor Gavin Newsom appointed Darling-Hammond to succeed Michael Kirst as president of the California State Board of Education.

Darling-Hammond was president of the American Educational Research Association and a member of the National Board for Professional Teaching Standards. She has served on the boards of directors for the Spencer Foundation, the Carnegie Foundation for the Advancement of Teaching, and the Alliance for Excellent Education. In 2011, she received the Lifetime Achievement Award from the California Educational Research Association. On 14 December 2021 Darling-Hammond became an international fellow at the Royal Swedish Academy of Engineering Sciences (IVA).

=== Policy work on equity, quality, and teaching ===
Darling-Hammond has been engaged in efforts to redesign schools. As Chair of the Model Standards Committee of the Interstate New Teacher Assessment and Support Consortium (INTASC), she led the effort to develop licensing standards for beginning teachers. As Chair of the New York State Council on Curriculum and Assessment she oversaw the process of developing the state's learning standards, curriculum frameworks, and assessments during the early 1990s.

From 1994 to 2001, Darling-Hammond served as executive director of the National Commission on Teaching and America's Future, chaired by Governor James B. Hunt, a blue-ribbon panel whose work put the issue of teaching quality on the map nationally and led to sweeping policy changes affecting teaching and schooling. Under her leadership, the commission carried out a strategy to build understanding and action for leveraging major improvements. The commission developed a national coalition as well as state and local partnerships in more than 25 states that built engagement and commitment to the issue of teacher quality, leading both to legislative changes and organizational reforms of schools and teacher education programs. The commission also carried out a public education campaign that brought the issue of teacher quality to a high level of public visibility. In 2006, Education Week named the commission's lead report, "What Matters Most: Teaching for America's Future," one of the most influential research studies affecting U.S. education.

In 2006, Education Week said that Darling-Hammond was one of the nation's 10 most influential people affecting education policy over the last decade She has received honorary doctorates from seven universities in the United States and abroad. She has also received numerous awards for her work over the course of her career.

=== Learning and teaching standards ===
While William F. Russell Professor at Teachers College, Columbia, Darling-Hammond co-founded the National Center for Restructuring Education, Schools, and Teaching (NCREST), which documented highly successful school models and supported a range of school reform initiatives in New York and nationally. As Chair of New York State's Council on Curriculum and Assessment in the early 1990s, she helped to fashion a comprehensive school reform plan for the state that developed new learning standards and curriculum frameworks to focus on learning goals and more performance-oriented assessments. This led to an overhaul of the state Regents examinations as well as innovations in school-based performance assessments and investments in new approaches to professional development.

As Chair of the Model Standards Committee of the Chief State School Officers' Interstate New Teacher Assessment and Support Consortium (INTASC), she led the development of licensing standards for beginning teachers. These were ultimately incorporated into the licensing standards of more than 40 states and became the foundation for a new teacher certification standards related to teaching competencies rather than merely the counting of course credits. She has been instrumental in developing performance assessments that allow teachers to demonstrate their classroom teaching skills as they are applied in practice, as an early member of the National Board for Professional Teaching Standards and, later as a co-founder of the Performance Assessment for California Teachers (PACT). The PACT consortium, comprising more than 30 university- and school-based teacher preparation programs, has designed and is implementing a performance assessment that examines how teachers plan, teach, and evaluate student learning in the classroom. The PACT assessments are now authorized for use in licensing California teachers.

=== Developing schools and programs ===
Darling-Hammond began her career as a public school teacher and has co-founded both a preschool/day care center and a charter public high school serving low-income students of color in East Palo Alto, California. In a community where only a third of students were graduating and almost none were going onto college, this new Early College High school – which admits students by lottery – has created a pipeline to college for more than 90 percent of its graduates. The school, along with seven others, is a professional development school partner with the Stanford Teacher Education Program (STEP), which prepares teachers for high-needs schools. Darling-Hammond led the redesign of the STEP program for this new program, and its successes have been acknowledged through recognition in several studies as one of the nation's top programs.

Darling-Hammond has worked with dozens of schools and districts around the nation on studying, developing, and scaling up new model schools—as well as launching preparation programs for teachers and leaders. Through the School Redesign Network (SRN) at Stanford University, she worked with a network of urban districts to redesign schools and district offices.

Darling-Hammond has said, "Lagging far behind our international peers in educational outcomes--and with one of the most unequal educational systems in the industrialized world--we need, I believe, something much more than and much different from what NCLB offers." She also praised the law for drawing attention to achievement gaps and for the right of all children to well-qualified teachers. She has suggested that, in addition to these major breakthroughs, "We badly need a national policy that enables schools to meet the intellectual demands of the twenty-first century (and) we need to pay off the educational debt to disadvantaged students that has accrued over centuries of unequal access to quality education." She has suggested that federal spending on education is inadequate to achieve the goals of the law.

=== Darling-Hammond on Teach For America ===
Though Darling-Hammond has acknowledged that Teach For America has brought new talent into the teaching profession, she is better known as a prominent critic of the program. In the spring of 2005, a study published by Stanford researchers including Darling-Hammond, concluded that teachers in Houston who entered without completing training and certification, including Teach For America teachers, were initially less effective than traditionally credentialed teachers and left the teaching profession at higher rates. "Our study doesn't say you shouldn't hire Teach For America teachers," said Darling-Hammond. "Our study says everyone benefits from preparation, including Teach For America teachers—that they became more effective when they became certified." Whitney Tilson, a former Teach for America official and a board member of Democrats for Education Reform said of Darling-Hammond, "'She's influential, clever and (while she does her best to hide it) an enemy of genuine reform.'"

== Candidacy for Secretary of Education ==
In 2008, Darling-Hammond was viewed as one of the most likely candidates for United States secretary of education in the Obama administration. At the time, others rumored to be under consideration included New York City Schools chancellor Joel Klein, Jonathan Schnur, chief executive of New Leaders, and Arne Duncan, chief executive officer of the Chicago Public Schools. Obama eventually chose Duncan for secretary of education. Citing commitments in California, Darling-Hammond later indicated that she would not be taking any other positions in the Obama administration.

However, Darling-Hammond's involvement in the federal government was not halted with that candidacy. In November 2020, Darling-Hammond was named the volunteer leader of the Joe Biden presidential transition Agency Review Team to support transition efforts related to the United States Department of Education.

== Recognition ==
Darling-Hammond was awarded the 2022 Yidan Prize for Education Research. The prize consists of a gold medal, a cash award of HK$15 million and a project fund of HK$15 million.

== Books ==
Darling-Hammond has written a number of books, including:

- Preparing Teachers for Deeper Learning (coauthored with Jeannie Oakes, 2019)
- Empowered Educators: How High-Performing Systems Shape Teaching Quality Around the World (2017)
- Be the Change: Reinventing School for Student Success (2015)
- Teaching in the Flat World: Learning from High-Performing Systems (2015)
- Beyond the Bubble Test: How Performance Assessments Support 21st Century Learning (2014)
- Getting Teacher Evaluation Right: What Really Matters for Effectiveness and Improvement (2013)
- The Flat World and Education: How America's Commitment to Equity Will Determine Our Future (2010)
- Powerful Learning: What We Know About Teaching for Understanding." (coauthored with Brigid Barron, P. David Pearson, Alan H. Schoenfeld, Elizabeth K., Stage, Timothy D. Zimmerman, et al.; 2008).
- Powerful teacher education: lessons from exemplary programs (2006)
- Preparing Teachers for a Changing World: What Teachers Should Learn and Be Able to Do (coauthored with John Bransford, 2006)
- Instructional Leadership for Systemic Change: The Story of San Diego's Reform (Leading Systemic School Improvement) (2005)
- A good teacher in every classroom: preparing the highly qualified teachers our children deserve (coauthored with Joan Baratz-Snowden, 2005)
- Professional development schools: schools for developing a profession (coauthored with Judith Lanier, 2005)
