= Michael W. Kirst =

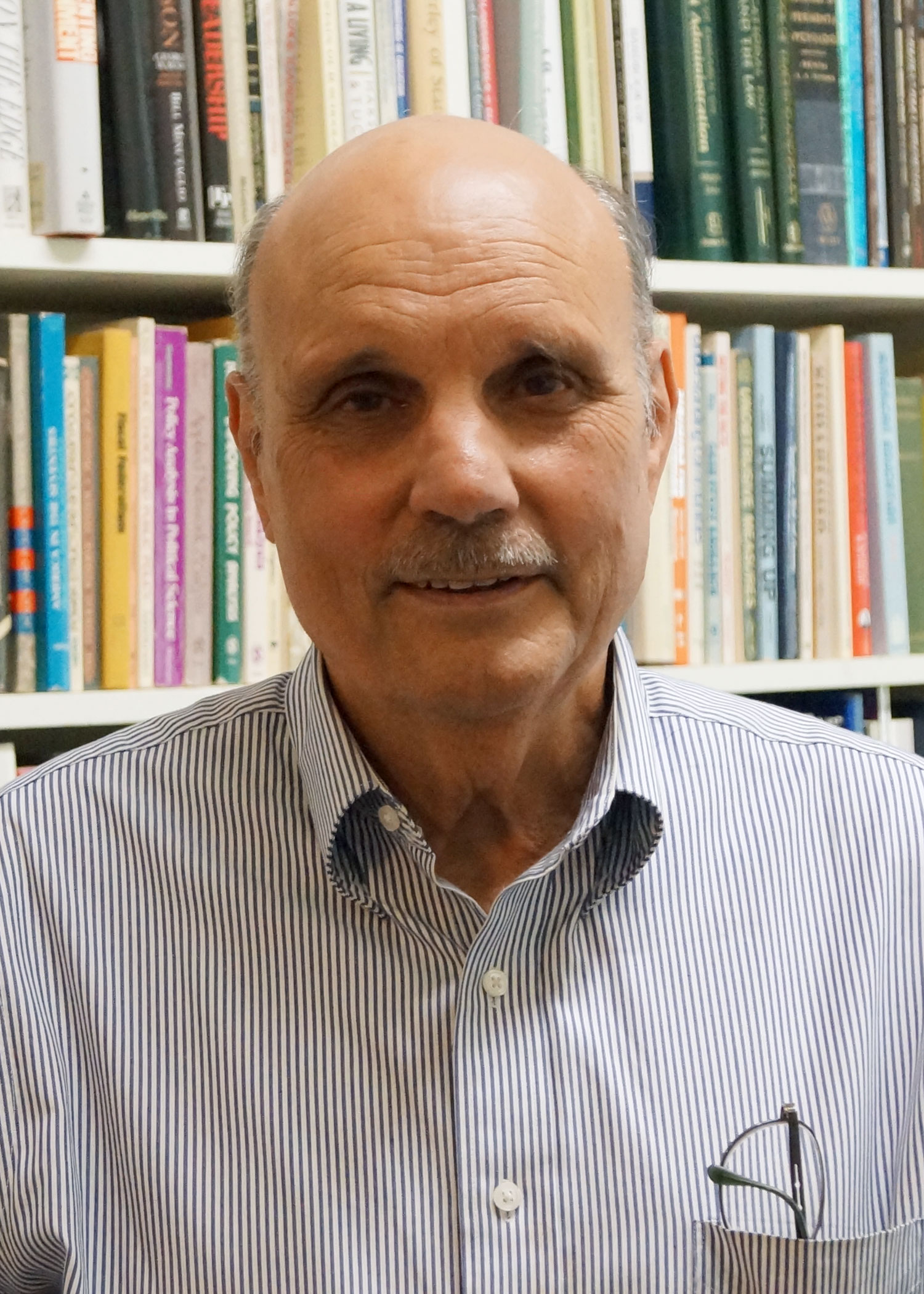
- Born: August 1, 1939 (age 86); West Reading, Pennsylvania, U.S.
- Education: Dartmouth College, B.A. (Economics), 1961; Harvard University, M.B.A (Government and Economics), 1963; Harvard University, Ph.D. (Political Economy and Government), 1964
- Employer(s): California State Board of Education; Stanford University

Michael W. Kirst (born August 1, 1939) is Professor Emeritus of Education (and Business Administration by courtesy) at Stanford University and the longest serving President of California's State Board of Education.

Kirst served as President of the California State Board of Education for four terms, serving from 1975 to 1982, and again from 2011 until 2019.

Kirst has advised Jerry Brown on education since 1974, including during Brown's two terms as Mayor of Oakland, California. He has served as a policymaker on education for 20 years, working for the federal government for several years in the 1960s and served on the Stanford faculty for 37 years (1969-2006).

He co-founded in 1983 the Policy Analysis Center for California Education (PACE) think tank. Kirst has written, co-authored, or edited fifteen books and nearly 230 articles, monographs, and working papers on school finance politics, curriculum politics, intergovernmental relations, as well as education reform policies.

== Biography ==
Michael Kirst was born on August 1, 1939, in West Reading, Pennsylvania, and received his bachelor's degree in economics from Dartmouth College in 1961 and his M.P.A. in government and economics from Harvard University in 1963. He earned his Ph.D. in political economy and government from Harvard in 1964. His bachelor, M.P.A. and Ph.D. studies were funded primarily through merit scholarships.

Kirst worked for the federal government before joining the faculty at Stanford. He held several positions, including staff director of the U.S. Senate Subcommittee on Manpower, Employment and Poverty, and director of program planning and evaluation for the Bureau of Elementary and Secondary Education in the U.S. Department of Education. He also held positions in the federal Office of Management and Budget, the White House Fellows, and worked as a program analyst for the Title I Elementary and Secondary Education Act Program since it began in 1965.

Kirst is the co-founder of the Policy Analysis for California Education (PACE), an independent, non-partisan research center led by faculty directors at Stanford University, the University of Southern California, the University of California Davis, the University of California Los Angeles, and the University of California Berkeley.

== University positions ==
Kirst has held a variety of university positions throughout his career. At Stanford University, he has served as:

- Chair, Administration and Policy Analysis, 1984-1992
- Coordinator, Joint Degrees with Graduate School of Business and School of Education, 1969-2002
- University Fellow, 1986-1988
- Chair, Public Service Center Faculty Board, 1989-1991
- Academic Senate, 1995-1998; 2004-2006

== Publications ==
Kirst is the author of a variety of literature regarding school finance, curriculum politics, intergovernmental relations, and education reform policies.

Books:

- Higher Education and Silicon Valley (Johns Hopkins University Press: Scott, W. Richard, 2017)
- Remaking College (Stanford: Stevens, Mitchell, 2015)
- The Political Dynamics of American Education (Richmond, Ca.:McCutchan, 2009) with Fred Wirt
- From High School to College: Improving Opportunities for Success in Postsecondary Education (Jossey Bass/Wiley, 2004) with Andrea Venezia.
- Schools in Conflict: Political Turbulence in American Education (Berkeley: McCutchan, 1992, 3rd edition), with Frederick Wirt. First edition published in 1982.
- Who Controls Our Schools: American Values in Conflict (New York: W.H. Freeman, 1984).
- Contemporary Issues in Education: Perspectives from Australia and U.S.A. (Berkeley: McCutchan, 1983), with Greg Hancock and David Grossman.
- State School Finance Alternatives (Eugene, Oregon: University of Oregon, 1975), with L. Pierce, W. Garms, and J. Guthrie.
- Revising School Finance in Florida (Tallahassee: Florida Governor's Office, 1973), with W. Garms.
- Federal Aid to Education: Who Governs, Who Benefits (Lexington, Ma.: D.C. Heath, 1972), with Joel Berke.
- State, School and Politics, Editor (Lexington, MA: D.C. Heath, 1972).
- The Political Web of American Schools (Boston: Little, Brown, 1972), with Frederick Wirt. Revised in 1975 and republished as Political and Social Foundations of Education (Berkeley: McCutchan).
- The Politics of Education at the Local, State, and Federal Levels, Editor (Berkeley: McCutchan, 1970).
- Government Without Passing Laws (University of North Carolina Press, 1969).

Kirst has also written and contributed to 24 monographs, 177 essays, 54 newspaper and magazine articles, and 54 web-based and working papers.
