= E. Jean Carroll v. Donald J. Trump =

Defamation and sexual-assault lawsuits

Carroll v. Trump
- Court: United States District Court for the Southern District of New York
- Full case name: E. Jean Carroll v. Donald J. Trump
- Docket nos.: Carroll I 20-cv-07311 24-644; 26-141; 26-142; Carroll II 22-cv-10016 23-793; 25-573
- Verdict: Trump liable for sexual abuse and defamation; Carroll II: $5 million damages; Carroll I: $83.3 million damages

Court membership
- Judge sitting: Lewis A. Kaplan

E. Jean Carroll v. Donald J. Trump is the name of two related civil lawsuits filed by American author E. Jean Carroll against United States President Donald Trump. The two suits, both overseen by U.S. District Court Judge Lewis A. Kaplan, resulted in a total of $88.3 million in damages being awarded to Carroll and are undergoing appeal efforts. The cases were related to Carroll's accusation from mid-2019 (during Trump's first term) that he sexually assaulted her in late 1995 or early 1996. Trump denied the allegations, prompting Carroll to sue him for defamation in November 2019 (a.k.a. Carroll I).

In November 2022, Carroll filed her second suit against Trump (a.k.a. Carroll II), renewing her claim of defamation and adding a claim of battery under the Adult Survivors Act, a New York law allowing sexual-assault victims to file civil suits beyond expired statutes of limitations. The suit went to trial in April 2023. Evidence included testimony from two friends Carroll spoke to after the alleged incident, a photograph of Carroll with Trump in 1987, (Note: In 2019, Trump dismissed the significance of the 1987 photograph of him with Carroll and both of their spouses, stating that he had never met her.) (Note: Also in 2019, Trump claimed that Carroll was "not [his] type". During his October 2022 deposition, when shown the 1987 photograph, Trump mistook Carroll for his ex-wife Marla Maples.) testimony from two women who had separately accused Trump of sexual assault, footage from the Trump Access Hollywood tape and his October 2022 deposition. (Note: Potential evidence included male DNA on a dress Carroll said she was wearing during the alleged assault, but after years of unsuccessful requests for a genetic sample from Trump, its discussion was ruled inadmissible in both New York trials. Were the U.S. Supreme Court to probe the factuality of Carroll's account during an appeal, Trump's DNA is accessible to state and federal investigators.) In reaching the verdict, the judge asked the jury to find if the preponderance of the evidence suggested that Trump raped Carroll under New York's narrow legal definition of rape at that time, denoting forcible penile penetration. (Note: New York Penal Law defines rape as vaginal penetration by the penis, which Carroll stated perhaps entered only "halfway".) (Note: A state law passed in late January 2024 expanded the state's legal definition of rape to include nonconsensual vaginal, anal, and oral contact, effective non-retroactively beginning in September 2024.) The jury instead found him liable for a lesser degree of sexual abuse, (Note: Kaplan stated that the verdict found that Trump had raped Carroll according to the common definition of the word, i.e. not necessarily implying penile penetration. While dismissing the counterclaim, Kaplan wrote that Carroll's accusation of rape is "substantially true".) as well as defamation, and ordered him to pay $5 million in damages. Trump unsuccessfully made a counterclaim and appealed to both the Second Circuit and the U.S. Supreme Court. In mid-2026, Carroll collected $5.6 million, including interest.

In September 2023, Kaplan issued a partial summary judgment regarding Carroll I, finding Trump liable for defamation via his 2019 statements. The jury verdict from the January 2024 trial was $83.3 million in additional damages. Trump secured a bond for this amount plus 10% to appeal. The Department of Justice (DOJ) also filed a motion to be swapped in as defendant under the Westfall Act, which would moot the case as the federal government cannot be sued for defamation. The Second Circuit rejected both efforts by April 2026. In July, Trump and the DOJ appealed to the Supreme Court, which has a review scheduled on December 4.

== Background ==
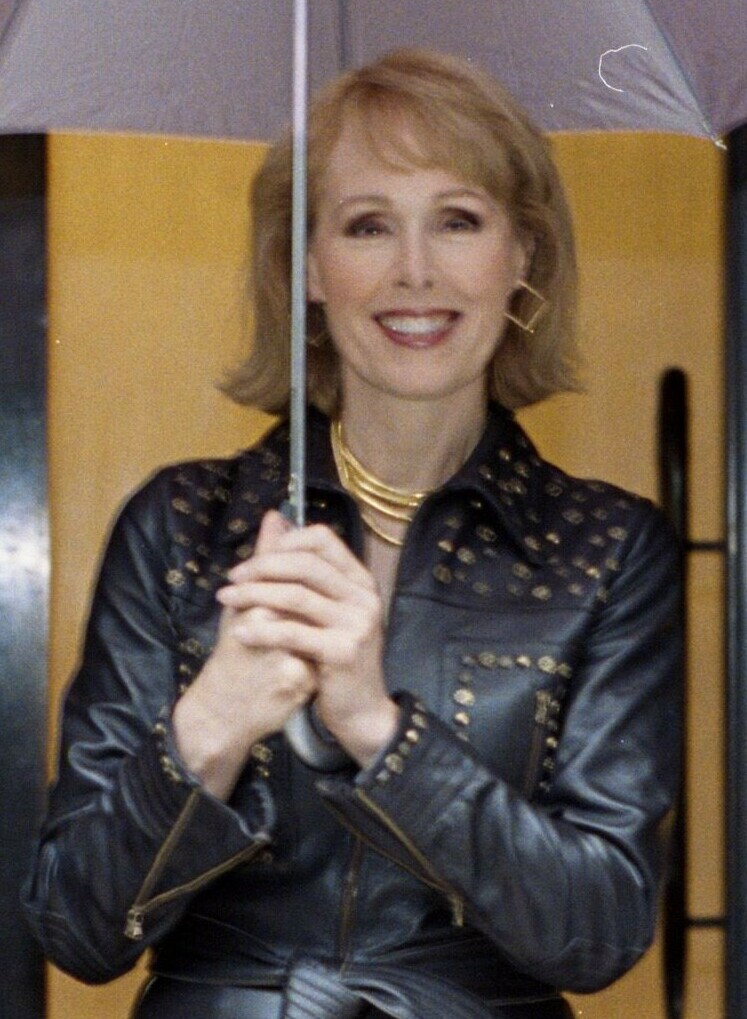
Carroll in 2006 (age 62), ten years after the alleged incident

On June 21, 2019, E. Jean Carroll published an article in New York magazine titled Hideous Men, stating that Donald Trump had sexually assaulted her in late 1995 or early 1996 in the Bergdorf Goodman department store in New York City. She is the only person whose rape allegation against Trump has been upheld as credible in court, though two other women have also accused him of rape: his first wife, Ivana Trump, who once alleged he raped her during their marriage before later recanting the claim, and a second woman—known publicly as "Jane Doe"—who accused Trump of raping her when she was 13, but withdrew her lawsuit before it could proceed.

Contrary to Trump's later assertion that she was a "then almost sixty-year-old woman", she is less than three years Trump's senior, being 52 at the time, and he 49. Further details of the reputed incident were published in Carroll's 2019 book What Do We Need Men For?: A Modest Proposal. Carroll said that on her way out of the store she ran into Trump and he asked for help buying a gift for a woman. After she suggested a handbag or a hat, the two reputedly moved on to the lingerie section and joked about the other trying some on. Carroll said they ended up in a dressing room together, the door of which was shut, and Trump forcefully kissed her, pulled down her tights and raped her before she was able to escape. She stated that the alleged incident lasted less than three minutes, during which time there was no sales attendant present in the department. Lisa Birnbach and Carol Martin told New York magazine that Carroll had confided with them shortly after the alleged assault.

A photograph of (left to right) Trump, Carroll, Carroll's then-husband John Johnson, and Trump's then-wife Ivana in 1987

The allegations were made during the first Trump administration. In an official government statement made on June 21, 2019, Trump denied that he had ever met Carroll, accused her of trying to sell books, implied she had a political agenda, compared the accusation to one against U.S. Supreme Court Justice Brett Kavanaugh, and said Bergdorf Goodman had confirmed they had no surveillance footage of the alleged incident. Trump further called on the public to provide information indicating that Carroll was conspiring with the Democratic Party or New York magazine. Trump separately stated in an interview with The Hill that Carroll was "totally lying" and that "she's not my type." Carroll provided New York with a photograph of her and her then-husband John Johnson socializing with Trump and his then-wife Ivana Trump in 1987. Trump dismissed its significance, saying, "Standing with my coat on in a line—give me a break—with my back to the camera. I have no idea who she is."

Carroll initially chose not to describe the alleged sexual assault as rape, instead describing it as a fight. "My word is fight. My word is not the victim word ... I fought." (Note: In her CNN interview with Anderson Cooper, Carroll explained that she felt that the word "rape" has "many sexual connotations", has been the subject of fantasies, and that she thought "most people think of rape as being sexy". She clarified that she felt that her experience "was not sexual. It just hurt.")

A couple of weeks after the New York magazine article was published, Carroll ran into lawyer George Conway (a Trump critic and husband of Kellyanne Conway), who told her to file a defamation lawsuit and helped her find a lawyer. Conway then wrote an op-ed for The Washington Post encouraging readers to believe Carroll.

== Initial litigation and related matters ==
=== Original defamation lawsuit (Carroll I; November 2019–April 2023) ===
In November 2019, Carroll filed a defamation lawsuit with the New York Supreme Court. The suit states that Trump had damaged her reputation, substantially harmed her professionally, and caused emotional pain. (Note: Carroll's lawyer Roberta Kaplan stated years later: "What was so offensive about [Trump's reaction] was the idea that she was just making it up to sell a book or two as part of a Democratic plot.")

Decades ago, the now President of the United States raped me. When I had the courage to speak out about the attack, he defamed my character, accused me of lying for personal gain, even insulted my appearance. No woman should have to face this. But this lawsuit is not only about me. I am filing this on behalf of every woman who has ever been harassed, assaulted, silenced, or spoken up only to be shamed, fired, ridiculed and belittled.

— E. Jean Carroll, in an email explaining her first lawsuit to NPR in 2019

After the lawsuit was filed, White House press secretary Stephanie Grisham described the lawsuit as "frivolous" and Carroll's story as fraudulent.

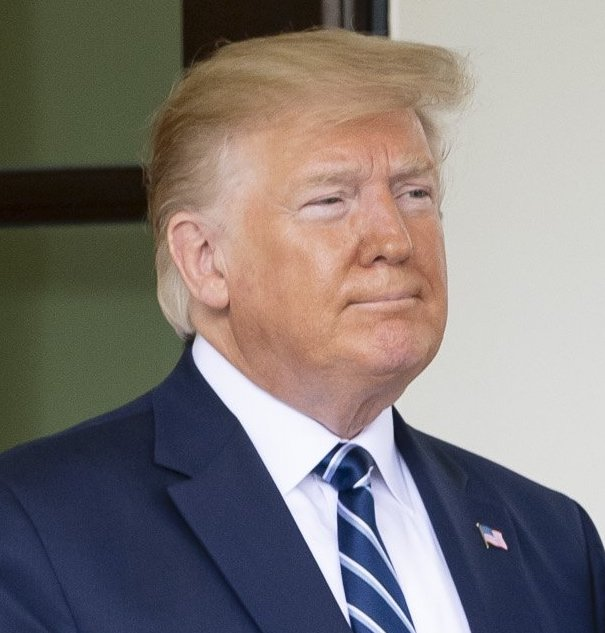
Trump in 2019

In January 2020, Carroll's attorneys served a request for a DNA sample from Trump for "analysis and comparison against unidentified male DNA present" on a black dress she was wearing when the alleged assault occurred. In December 2020, Carroll said she was willing to delay collecting the sample and testimony from Trump in exchange for earlier access to other relevant records. The DNA sample request included a DNA report on Carroll and five others who may have come into contact with the dress during a photo shoot.

In September 2020, government lawyers from the Department of Justice (DOJ) asserted that Trump had acted in his official capacity while responding to Carroll's accusation; they said that the Federal Tort Claims Act (Note: The Federal Tort Claims Act is a 1946 federal statute that permits private parties to sue the U.S. in federal court for most torts committed by persons acting on behalf of the U.S.) grants their department the right to take the case from Trump's private lawyers and move it to federal court. A White House official also argued that the act provides precedent for the government to exercise this right. Carroll's lawyer Roberta Kaplan stated that "Trump's effort to wield the power of the U.S. government to evade responsibility for his private misconduct is without precedent." In October 2020, U.S. District Court Judge Lewis Kaplan (of no relation to Roberta Kaplan) rejected the DOJ's motion, ruling that the president is not a government employee and that Trump's comments were not related to his job as such. The following month, the DOJ filed an appeal with the Second Circuit Court of Appeals.

In June 2021 (during the Biden administration) the DOJ argued to the Second Circuit that DOJ lawyers should defend Trump as a federal employee, stating, "Speaking to the public and the press on matters of public concern is undoubtedly part of an elected official's job." On September 27, 2022, the appeals court passed the question of whether Trump was shielded by his former office as U.S. president on to the District of Columbia (D.C.) appeals court. Trump's attorney Alina Habba praised the ruling as a reversal of the District Court's stance (that the comments were not executive business).

In January 2023, the D.C. appeals court held oral arguments before a full panel of judges. Trump's lawyers argued that his comments fell within the scope of his employment, while some judges pointed out that D.C. law holds employers responsible when their employees cause individuals harm in the scope of their employment but not otherwise. Judge Catharine Easterly noted that employer liability cases usually have a trial record and jury verdict to refer to, while Judge John Howard questioned whether further fact-finding was warranted.

In March 2023, Judge Kaplan ruled that the infamous Donald Trump Access Hollywood tape and the testimonies of Jessica Leeds and Natasha Stoynoff (who both allege that Trump began groping them without permission) would be admissible at the trial for the original lawsuit. (Note: Although the defense pointed out that someone's propensity for an action is generally inadmissible, a federal rule allows that "In a civil case involving a claim for relief based on a party's alleged sexual assault ... the court may admit evidence that the party committed any other sexual assault".) He then postponed the trial for the defamation claim while the appeals court continued to deliberate.

On April 21, 2023, the Second Circuit said it should not be responsible for deciding the question of whether Trump had acted within the scope of his role as president when he made public comments about Carroll, and it remanded the issue to the U.S. District Court for Judge Kaplan to decide. In July, the DOJ recanted its position that Trump was acting in his official capacity.

=== Statement by Trump (October 2022) ===
On October 12, 2022, Trump published a post on Truth Social against E. Jean Carroll, to which he attached a June 2019 photograph of her. Carroll would later successfully claim this post as defamatory in her second lawsuit against him.

This "Ms. Bergdorf Goodman" case is a complete con job ... I don't know this woman, have no idea who she is, other than it seems she got a picture of me many years ago, with her husband, shaking my hand on a reception line at a celebrity charity event. She completely made up a story that I met her at the doors of this crowded New York City Department Store and, within minutes, "swooned" her. It is a Hoax and a lie, just like all the other Hoaxes that have been played on me for the past seven years. ... She has no idea what day, what week, what month, what year, or what decade this so-called "event" supposedly took place. The reason she doesn't know is because it never happened, and she doesn't want to get caught up with details or facts that can be proven wrong. If you watch Anderson Cooper's interview with her, where she was promoting a really crummy book, you will see that it is a complete Scam. She changed her story from beginning to end, after the commercial break, to suit the purposes of CNN and Andy Cooper. ... For the record, E. Jean Carroll is not telling the truth, is a woman who I had nothing to do with, didn't know, and would have no interest in knowing her if I ever had the chance.

— Excerpted from the October 12, 2022 Truth Social post by Donald Trump

=== Deposition of Trump (October 2022) ===
Trump was deposed by Carroll's lawyer Roberta Kaplan on October 19. Trump said that he usually had security guards with him but was unable to name any working for him at that time. He denied reaching out to Bergdorf Goodman ahead of his statements in 2019, arguing that "if it did happen, it would have been reported within minutes". He accused Carroll and her lawyer of being "aligned with Hillary Clinton", an assertion he based on "somebody [having] mentioned it", but admitted that he had no knowledge of Carroll's political party or documentation of her pursuing a political agenda; he went on to repeatedly accuse Roberta Kaplan of being a political operative of Clinton or the Democratic Party. When asked if anyone had given him information on Carroll conspiring with that party or New York magazine, Trump said, "I'll let you know." He threatened to sue Carroll and Kaplan after the proceedings were complete. He also accused Carroll of attempting to sabotage his 2024 presidential campaign by keeping him "busy with litigation". Trump called the litigation a hoax comparable to supposed ruses against him related to both Russia and Ukraine.

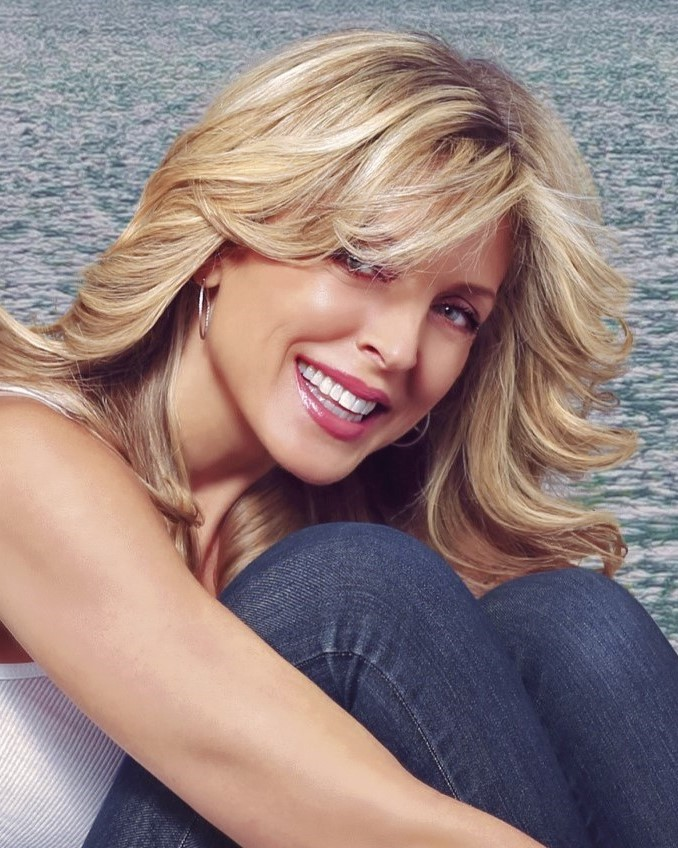
Trump's second ex-wife, Marla Maples

Trump reiterated that Carroll was "not my type", and told the lawyer, "You would not be a choice of mine either ... under any circumstances." When he was shown a 1987 photograph he had characterized as a reception line at a charity event, he mistook Carroll for his second wife, Marla Maples, despite his first wife Ivana Trump also being in the picture. When his lawyer pointed out his mistake, Trump said that the photo was "very blurry". He then confirmed that all of his wives were his "type", and that by type he primarily meant physical type. He attacked Carroll for not remembering the exact year of the alleged incident and, upon further questioning, was unable to recall the years of his weddings and divorces, and said that he was unsure if he had any extramarital affairs during his first marriage (despite his affair with Maples having regularly featured in New York tabloids).

Trump reiterated in his deposition that he did not know Carroll before she sued him, calling her a "nut job" and inaccurately asserting that in her CNN interview with Anderson Cooper she "actually indicated that she loved" the alleged assault and "said it was very sexy to be raped". (Carroll had actually said, "I was not thrown on the ground and ravished, which... The word rape carries so many sexual connotations. This was not—this was not sexual. It just hurt. ... I think most people think of rape as being sexy.") He said Carroll alleged he "swooned" her, a word he said he used because he thought it would be more polite than saying fucked. When asked if he had made the statements in the Access Hollywood tape (e.g., "when you're a star, [beautiful women] let you do it. They let you do anything. ... grab 'em by the pussy"), Trump responded, "Well, historically, that's true with stars. If you look over the last million years, that's largely true, unfortunately or fortunately." He then agreed that he was such a "star".

== Lawsuit alleging battery and defamation (November 2022–September 2026) ==
=== Expansion to battery claim (Carroll II; November 2022) ===
On November 24, 2022, Carroll sued Trump for battery under the Adult Survivors Act (a law passed the previous May which allows sexual-assault victims to file civil suits beyond expired statutes of limitations). Carroll made a renewed claim of defamation, citing Trump's statements on Truth Social from October. The second suit alleges that: Trump manhandled Carroll, "pulled down her tights", groped around her genitals and raped her; this reputedly left Carroll unable to develop sexual relationships. Carroll sought unspecified damages for the two charges and for Trump to retract his Truth Social statements about her. Lawyers for Trump said in a December 19 court filing that they would request a dismissal of the lawsuit partially on the basis that the New York law is invalid due to its allegedly contradicting the state's constitution regarding due process. Judge Kaplan set the trial date for April 25, 2023, and denied the request to dismiss the lawsuit.

As the case is the second to be called E. Jean Carroll v. Donald J. Trump, it is distinguished by the name Carroll II in court documents.

=== Pre-trial (January–April 2023) ===
One discovery dispute concerned Trump's DNA. On February 10, 2023, Trump's lead lawyer in the case since January 31, Joe Tacopina, said Trump would be willing to provide a DNA sample, although the discovery period had ended after three years of Carroll's lawyers requesting such a sample. (Note: Judge Kaplan noted that despite her request for a sample, Carroll had not moved to compel Trump to provide it, although Habba had stated that if this had occurred, Trump's team would "adamantly oppose it and seek a protective order to prevent its enforcement".) Further, Tacopina stipulated that an appendix from Carroll's report detailing the DNA on the dress must first be proffered and that Trump's DNA would be submitted only for comparison to that material. Carroll's lawyer asserted that the motion was a "bad-faith effort to taint the potential jury pool". On February 15 Judge Kaplan dismissed Trump's offer as an out-of-line delay tactic. Further, the judge argued that the presence of Trump's DNA would not conclusively prove whether a rape occurred as no sperm was detected. In late March, the judge prohibited any mention of DNA evidence at the trial.

On February 16, 2023, Trump's lawyers requested that the allegations from Leeds and Stoynoff and the Access Hollywood tape be barred as evidence (the tape having been cited by Carroll's lawyer as evidence of a larger pattern of sexual misconduct). Carroll's counsel argued that the accounts of the two women demonstrate a "consistent pattern". On March 2 Trump's lawyers again asked for the tape's dismissal, arguing that it does not demonstrate a pattern of behavior consistent with Carroll's accusation. In March, Kaplan ruled that the tape and testimony from the two women would be admissible at the trial for the second suit along with testimony from two Bergdorf Goodman employees. Trump's purported "rebuttal damage expert" was rejected because he did not qualify as an expert witness. Kaplan also denied a joint request from both parties to consolidate the two lawsuits into one trial.

On February 23, Trump's lawyers requested that the defamation claim in the second lawsuit be dismissed, arguing that his Truth Social post from October was merely a response regarding the first lawsuit which mostly repeated previous positions (despite making original incursions), (Note: In his Truth Social post about Carroll from October 2022, Trump claimed that she implied he "swooned" her, called her story a "hoax and a lie" like "all the [others]" against him since 2015, stated that she "has no idea ... what decade" the alleged assault occurred, and said she changed her story during her CNN interview with Anderson Cooper to suit that outlet's tastes.) and was thus protected under supposed "absolute litigation privilege" provided by New York State Civil Rights Law § 74. In late March, Judge Kaplan denied this request.

On March 11, Judge Kaplan asked Trump and Carroll if they had any objection to the use of an anonymous jury. On March 23 Kaplan ruled that the jury would be anonymous for the trial. He cited Trump's incendiary rhetoric against perceived enemies (including officials) ahead of his criminal indictment in New York related to hush money payments to Stormy Daniels. On April 10 Kaplan ruled that the jury would be anonymous even to the lawyers involved in the case, citing threats by Trump supporters against Judge Juan Merchan, who was overseeing the New York criminal investigation of The Trump Organization. On April 14 Kaplan upheld his ruling for an anonymous jury and denied a request from Trump's team for information about its members on the basis of possible bias after they cited negative online comments made about him on Carroll's June 2019 New York article.

On April 10, Trump and Carroll were given ten days to declare whether they would attend the trial. Defense attorney Tacopina speculated about "logistical and financial burdens upon New York City" associated with Trump's physical appearance. On April 20 the judge argued that Trump had had "ample time" to make arrangements for trial and said it would be no easier for the Secret Service to protect him at his newly announced April 27 campaign event in New Hampshire than at the simultaneous trial.

On April 11, defense attorney Tacopina asked to delay the trial by a month, arguing that media coverage of the Daniels scandal would taint the jury pool. Carroll's lawyer argued that Trump "instigated (and sought to benefit from) ... much of the very coverage about which he now complains." On April 17 Kaplan agreed with Carroll's lawyer and ruled against the delay request, arguing that there was no reason to assume jury selection would be easier to conduct in May.

On April 13, Trump's attorneys asked to reopen discovery about whether Carroll knew that her lawyer's firm had received donations from a nonprofit supported by Democrat-aligned billionaire and LinkedIn co-founder Reid Hoffman. Carroll had denied knowledge of outside funding in a 2022 deposition, with her lawyers stating that she now recalled that "her counsel secured additional funding from a non-profit organization to offset certain expenses". Judge Kaplan allowed narrow discovery, including a new deposition of Carroll, to address the matter. Trump's attorneys requested an extra month to make their inquiry, but Kaplan refused to delay the trial. On April 21, the judge sealed the information related to Hoffman's alleged contributions, as requested by Carroll's team. An appeals court found that there was no evidence that Carroll was personally involved in obtaining the funding. Hoffman later said that his non-profit chose to help fund Carroll's lawsuit because "her voice should be heard". In May 2026 it was reported that the U.S. Attorney in Chicago was investigating Hoffman's non-profit for money laundering, conspiracy and obstruction.

=== Trial (April–May 2023) ===
The trial began on April 25, 2023, in federal court at the U.S. District Court for the Southern District of New York. That day, the judge selected a jury of six men and three women, anonymous even to the judge, and it was arranged that the jury would be transported by U.S. Marshals from an underground garage throughout the trial. In opening statements that day, the judge advised both counsel to tell their clients to avoid comments likely to "inspire violence".

On April 26, Carroll testified; she said she was unaware if any employees were present during the alleged incident because the department was on a different story and she was focused on riding the escalator, while also supposing that the encounter would make a humorous anecdote. She said after entering the dressing room, Trump slammed her against the wall (hurting the back of her head) and digitally penetrated her before doing so with his penis (causing vaginal pain). She said she struggled against Trump, and upon leaving the store, was "extremely rattled" and in disbelief about what happened. She talked with her friend Lisa Birnbach on the phone, thinking, "If Lisa thought it was funny then it was not a bad thing and I didn't completely do a stupid thing," Carroll recalled thinking. "I had not processed it. I had not processed what was going on." Birnbach told Carroll, who was laughing on the phone, that it wasn't funny, that Carroll was raped and should report the assault to the police, Carroll testified.

Carroll said that the following evening she told her friend and co-worker Carol Martin, who reputedly confirmed Carroll's fear that if she publicly discussed the incident, Trump would retaliate via his legal team. She further acknowledged her political distaste of Trump but said, "I'm settling a personal score because he called me a liar repeatedly and it really has decimated my reputation." She said she did not go public during Trump's 2016 campaign because "the more women who came forward to accuse him, the better he did in the polls". Additionally, Carroll said she initially thought the incident happened in 1994 or 1995, until realizing Lisa Birnbach visited Mar-a-Lago to write a February 1996 New York story on Trump (after 5–6 months of communicating by phone), which Carroll said would not have occurred if her friend knew about the alleged attack.

Also on April 26, Carroll's lawyers introduced a 2017 email exchange between her and Martin, indicating an intention to "scheme" by doing their "patriotic duty". Carroll stated that she was not scheming to "bring down Donald Trump", as Tacopina suggested the messages could imply. A former Bergdorf Goodman manager testified that departments were often left unattended and dressing rooms left open (though the doors would have automatically locked if closed). The judge ruled that evidence related to Reid Hoffman's funding of the trial was inadmissible, saying, "I've determined there is virtually nothing there in terms of credibility." Trump commented about the suit on Truth Social, calling it a scam and mentioning the (inadmissible) DNA evidence. Judge Kaplan warned Tacopina that Trump should stop making such comments, as they constitute a potential liability to him.

On April 27, Carroll was cross-examined by Tacopina, who asked why she did not scream during the alleged incident. She said she "was too much in panic to scream". She said she was surprised by the sudden turn to assault, which she alleged began with Trump pushing her against the wall and kissing her, and ended with no communication between them; she said she noticed no other customers as she left. She said she had experienced daily regret since first suing Trump due to feeling threatened, elaborating that she had received many negative comments echoing Trump's attacks. Additionally, she said she was unable to recall the specific meaning of her 2017 email response to Martin. Carroll said she omitted the incident from her diary because she thought it would force her to think about the negative experience, and said she was inspired to come forward by the #MeToo movement, especially the Harvey Weinstein sexual abuse cases. She said that although she wanted her book to succeed, she was not struggling financially. Tacopina mentioned the dress Carroll allegedly wore during the incident, leading the judge to stop testimony for the day, though Tacopina claimed he had not planned to mention the barred DNA evidence.

Carroll finished testifying on May 1, whereat Tacopina cited inconsistencies in Carroll's account, such as her stating that she had not used the Bergdorf fitting rooms in the years after the alleged assault before saying that she actually had used them since the incident. Tacopina played an audio clip of Carroll saying that she did not blame Trump for the cessation of her romantic life, but that she "just didn't have the luck to meet that person that would cause me to be desirous again" and that "maybe in that dressing room my desire for desire was killed". Carroll had said that she was a "big fan" of Trump's show The Apprentice due to its outstanding "witty competition". She also asked on social media, "Would you have sex with Donald Trump for $17,000? Even if you could a) give the money to charity? b) close your eyes? And he's not allowed to speak." Additionally, Tacopina asked if Carroll had seen a 2012 episode of Law & Order: Special Victims Unit involving a rape in a Bergdorf fitting room, (Note: The episode in question is Season 13, Episode 11, "Theatre Tricks". In a petition to the U.S. Supreme Court, Trump's counsel described the episode as featuring a "business mogul" fantasizing about committing such a rape, but the show actually features a judge involved in a planned and consensual encounter.) which Carroll said she had not seen and called an "astonishing" coincidence. Tacopina also referred to an incident in which Carroll called the police to report vandalism to a mailbox, prompting her to explain, "I don't want anybody to know that I suffer. Up until now, I would be ashamed to let people know what is actually going on."

Also on May 1, Trump's team requested a mistrial, alleging that the judge was being unfair in Carroll's favor. During cross-examination Tacopina had questioned a passage from Carroll's 2019 book suggesting that all men should be sent to Montana for "retraining", and the judge explained it was an allusion to Jonathan Swift's A Modest Proposal (the title of which Carroll took for her 2019 book's subtitle), which satirically suggests that poor Irish people might ease their economic troubles by selling their children as food to the rich. Tacopina complained that the judge, by providing this clarification, had "bolstered [Carroll's] testimony". Judge Kaplan denied the request for a mistrial without comment.

On May 2, witnesses testified for Carroll. Lisa Birnbach said that in 1996, remembering having met with Trump that January for a story she was writing, said that Carroll called her, and short of breath, alleged that Trump had just assaulted her. Birnbach reputedly offered to transport Carroll to the police, but the latter refused and requested that their conversation remain secret. Birnbach said she did not talk about it again until 2019, once Carroll had decided to go public with her account. Jessica Leeds, a retired stockbroker, testified that Trump had suddenly groped her in a similar manner to Carroll while Leeds was traveling on an airplane in the late 1970s. Leeds said a flight attendant invited her to move to first class and sat her next to Donald Trump, whom she did not know, and that he groped her breast and tried to kiss her, but that she broke away when he started reaching up her skirt. She recalled passengers sitting behind them, who did not intervene, and reasoned that the incident may have lasted less than a minute. Leeds said she did not speak about the incident but that Trump later saw her and referred to her as "that cunt from the airplane". Also on May 2, Tacopina confirmed that Trump would not testify at the trial.

On May 3, video of Trump's deposition was shown to the jury. Trump stated that he rarely shopped at Bergdorf Goodman and reiterated that he did not read Carroll's written accusations in either her book or in her New York magazine article. A clinical psychologist testified that she evaluated Carroll and found that she had been harmed by the alleged rape but found no signs of mental disorder. Journalist Natasha Stoynoff testified that while visiting Mar-a-Lago in December 2005, Trump brought her to look at a room while his wife Melania was changing outfits; he allegedly forced her against a wall and kissed her, while she tried to push him off, and told her they were going to have an affair, citing the well-known "best sex I've ever had" quote attributed to his previous wife Marla Maples. Stoynoff said she only told a limited number of people because she did not want it to affect her career. A clip was played to the jury of Trump denying Stoynoff's claim while running for president, in which he implies she is unattractive. Additionally, on May 3, Tacopina announced that Trump's team would not present a defense case. Tacopina said that, due to health concerns, they decided not to call an expert witness they had proposed.

On May 4, news anchor Carol Martin testified and corroborated Carroll's account of their conversation following the alleged assault, thinking it occurred sometime between 1994 and 1996, and remembering Carroll saying she had also told Birnbach. Martin said she and Carroll did not "scheme" against Trump, though the former demonstrated hate for Trump in some of her text messages. Clips of Trump's deposition were played. Both the plaintiff and defendant rested their case on May 4. That day Trump made a statement from Ireland indicating he might come to the trial. The judge allowed Trump to move to reopen the case, but Trump did not respond by the May 7 deadline.

On May 8, closing arguments were made. Carroll's lawyer Roberta Kaplan cited her client's attire during the alleged assault—a wool dress with tights—as indicating the weather at the time, which Carroll had narrowed down to after Birnbach's collaboration with Trump on a February 1996 article, further thinking it happened on a Thursday because the store was open late. Additionally, it reputedly happened while Carroll hosted a talk show on America's Talking (1994–1996), which Kaplan argued Trump likely saw in part because it was on immediately before an interview with him filmed in the same building for the same network. Kaplan argued that Carroll "was trying to come to grips with the fact that she was being attacked", which she remembered in "great detail". Kaplan cited the moment in Trump's deposition when he mixed up Carroll with his wife, evidently debunking his claim that she was not his "type"; further, Kaplan asserted that Trump followed an established pattern of behavior of his when caught in wrongdoing by making an excuse (that the photograph was reputedly blurry).

Another of Carroll's lawyers argued that Tacopina relied on rhetoric rather than evidence and cited Trump's failure to deny the charges in person, further ridiculing the idea that Carroll, Birnbach, and Martin secretly conspired to take down Trump based on the plot of an episode of Law & Order: SVU. Tacopina focused on the gaps in the plaintiff's case, particularly the unknown date of the incident, asserting that she "tailored her testimony" by saying she realized it was on a Thursday, and accused her of failing to bring the case to police because it "would never make it through a police investigation in a million years". Tacopina repeated Trump's dismissal of the Access Hollywood tape as "locker room talk" and argued that it shows Trump bragging about "women letting you do something" rather than sexual assault. He argued that Leeds's story was false because other airline passengers would not have sat by and let it happen. He also asserted that the plaintiff could have called Trump as a witness but, "Instead, what they want is for you to hate him enough to ignore the facts."

=== Verdict and aftermath (May 2023–September 2026) ===
The jury reached a decision on May 9, 2023, after deliberating for less than three hours. Considering the preponderance of the evidence, the jury delivered a verdict that first stated that Carroll had not proven that Trump raped her, and next stated that Carroll did prove that Trump was responsible for a lesser degree of sexual abuse, and also stated that Trump defamed Carroll with false statements made with actual malice in the October 2022 Truth Social post; thus the jury awarded Carroll a total of $5 million in damages from Trump. The judge had given the jury "the narrow, technical meaning" of the term rape under New York law as it existed at that time, defining rape as forcible penetration with the penis as alleged by Carroll.

In an appearance on CNN the day after the verdict, Trump continued to disparage Carroll; he called her a "whack job", said the trial was "rigged", denied raping Carroll and said "I didn't do anything else either," and claimed "I don't know who the hell she is." This led Carroll to consider a third defamation lawsuit against Trump concerning these comments.

On May 11, 2023, Trump appealed the verdict. On June 8, Trump's team requested the award to be reduced to under $1 million or that a new trial should be held regarding damages, citing the jury's supposed rejection of the rape claim. Carroll's lawyers said that Trump mischaracterized the verdict (that he sexually abused Carroll) as supporting his contention that he did not rape her. On June 23, Trump's lawyers proffered $5.55 million to a federal court in case the appeal failed. On July 19, Judge Kaplan denied Trump's bid for a new trial, as there was no "seriously erroneous result" nor "miscarriage of justice". Analyzing Trump's arguments, Kaplan found that Trump "misinterprets the jury's verdict", as in actuality, the "proof convincingly established, and the jury implicitly found, that Mr. Trump deliberately and forcibly penetrated Ms. Carroll's vagina with his fingers, causing immediate pain and long lasting emotional and psychological harm". Kaplan affirmed that Trump had raped Carroll according to the common meaning of the word and ruled against altering the award amount. In a memorandum opinion, Judge Kaplan wrote:

the definition of rape in the New York Penal Law is far narrower than the meaning of "rape" in common modern parlance, its definition in some dictionaries, in some federal and state criminal statutes, and elsewhere. The finding that Ms Carroll failed to prove that she was "raped" within the meaning of the New York Penal Law does not mean that she failed to prove that Mr. Trump "raped" her as many people commonly understand the word "rape". Indeed, as the evidence at trial ... makes clear, the jury found that Mr. Trump in fact did exactly that.

On June 27, 2023, Trump filed a counterclaim alleging that Carroll had defamed him, particularly when she told CNN "yes he did" rape her in response to a question about the jury not finding him liable for that offense. According to Carroll's lawyer, four other statements made in the counterclaim occurred outside New York's one-year statute of limitations. On August 7, Judge Kaplan dismissed the counterclaim and wrote that Carroll's accusation of rape is "substantially true" according to the common definition of the word, i.e. not necessarily implying penile penetration. A few days later, Trump appealed the dismissal.

Separately, in March 2024, an ABC News anchor inaccurately stated that the jury found Trump liable for rape. That December, Trump sued ABC News for defamation, leading to a $16 million settlement from the network.

On May 14, 2024, Carroll's lawyers requested that Trump's appeal be expedited, arguing that its completion by that July would lessen the chance of Trump seeking delays related to other trials or his potential presidency. The federal appeals court held a hearing on September 6, during which Trump's lawyers argued that evidence was improperly shown to the jury, specifically the testimony of Trump accuser Jessica Leeds and the Access Hollywood tape. They also argued that they were "unreasonably restricted" from: asking questions about billionaire Reid Hoffman, making arguments about George Conway's conversations with Carroll before her lawsuit, and questioning Carroll about statements she made about Trump's DNA and her dress. On December 30, three Second Circuit judges upheld the $5 million verdict, saying that Trump had failed to show that the district court had erred. On January 14, 2025, Trump asked the appeals court for an en banc hearing, which would be held before a full court rather than just a select panel; the request was rejected on June 13.

After requesting and receiving a two-month extension to their deadline to appeal to the U.S. Supreme Court, on November 10, 2025, Trump's team asked the high court to overturn the verdict. The petition largely revolved around whether the admission of the Access Hollywood tape and testimony from other accusers violated federal evidence rules, with Trump's team asserting the case's relevance due to his being president and Carroll's accusations allegedly being false. After repeatedly delaying a conference to consider taking up the matter over the first half of 2026, the Supreme Court declined to hear the appeal on June 29. On July 8, Trump filed a petition for a reconsideration of his appeal, which the court distributed during its recess.

Also on July 8, Kaplan denied Trump's request to delay the release of the money to Carroll as Trump could sue to recover it in the "highly unlikely" event that the Supreme Court reconsidered the appeal and ruled in his favor. The money plus interest, a total of over $5.6 million, was disbursed to Carroll on July 14. On August 17, the Supreme Court again declined to hear the appeal. In September, Trump ended all remaining appeal efforts in the case.

== Return to original defamation lawsuit (May 2023–present) ==
=== Pretrial (May 2023–January 2024) ===
On May 9, 2023, Judge Kaplan explained to jurors a verdict form, discussing three types of battery for which Trump could be liable to pay damages under New York law: rape, sexual abuse, and forcible touching.

Seeking $10 million in damages, Carroll amended her original defamation suit on May 22, 2023, to include additional comments Trump made following the verdict against him that month, both on a CNN town hall broadcast and Truth Social. After that amendment was filed, Trump made further negative remarks about Carroll on Truth Social, in which he admitted he had met her as captured by the 1987 photograph, despite having otherwise claimed (including in his 2019 official statement) that he had not.

In court filings on May 26 and June 5, Trump's lawyers sought to prevent Carroll from amending her case, including her replacement of the word 'rape' with 'sexual assault', on the basis that the May verdict rejected Carroll's claim that Trump raped her. In fact, the jury only found that the rape accusation was unproven as compared to sexual abuse. On June 13, Judge Kaplan ruled that Carroll could amend her lawsuit. Two days later, Kaplan ruled that the trial would begin on January 15, 2024, unless the case had "been entirely disposed of" by that date.

On June 1, Kaplan denied a Trump ally's request to dismiss the case on the basis that Trump was being persecuted for being a white Christian.

Trump's team asked for the case to be dismissed partially based on free speech protections and purported presidential immunity; on June 29, Kaplan denied this request, arguing that novel defenses (e.g., absolute immunity) had been introduced too late. Trump's team appealed this decision and requested for the trial to be delayed during the appeal effort; on August 18, Kaplan denied the delay. On September 12, Alina Habba argued to a three-judge panel of the Second Circuit that District Court proceedings should be stayed until the appeals court "resolves whether a president may raise his immunity defense". The next day, the appeals court denied the stay request but granted an expedited appeal process, which would also cover the matter of Trump's dismissed counterclaim. During an October 23 hearing, Circuit Judge Denny Chin defended Kaplan's opinion that Trump's immunity defense had been introduced too late. On December 13, the Second Circuit ruled that Trump could not use presidential immunity as a defense because he had raised it too late. On January 8, the Second Circuit declined to take up Trump's appeal again.

On July 11, 2023, the DOJ dropped its prior position that Trump had been acting in the scope of his office when making his initial responses to Carroll's allegations.

On September 6, 2023, Kaplan issued a partial summary judgment in favor of Carroll, ruling that Trump was liable for defaming Carroll via statements he made in 2019. Kaplan ruled that the jury's verdict in Carroll II "plainly established that Mr. Trump's 2019 statements were false", with the "substantive content" of Trump's defamatory 2022 statement being "identical to the substantive content" of Trump's 2019 statements; in both statements, Trump accused Carroll of "concocting a sexual assault allegation for improper purposes"; since "the jury considered and decided issues that are common to both cases" and concluded that "the sexual assault occurred", this indicated that "Carroll did not lie about it". As a result, the 2024 trial was expected to primarily focus on determining the amount of additional damages Trump would owe Carroll.

On November 3, Kaplan announced that the jury would again be anonymous, citing Trump's statements about the court and case. On November 13, Trump's team moved to add "a new rebuttal expert", after the court twice rejected proposed expert witness Robert Fisher (who argued Carroll "benefitted from this public dispute"). On November 29, Trump posted on Truth Social that the Adult Survivors Act was unconstitutional, further disparaging Carroll and calling the case "election interference" (as he had said about a number of other unsettled legal matters).

On December 21, less than a month before the trial's start date, Trump's team requested a 90-day delay to allow further appeal planning (possibly including a strategy of asking for the case to be heard by the U.S. Supreme Court), citing Special Counsel Jack Smith's recent description of the question of immunity as being "weighty and consequential" in the federal criminal case against Trump for alleged election obstruction. On December 28, a three-judge panel for the Second Circuit denied the delay request.

Also on December 21, Carroll's lawyer asked Judge Kaplan to indicate quotes from the New York civil investigation of The Trump Organization he intended to cite in the trial. The judge responded that Trump's testimony related to his wealth would be relevant to the jury's calculation of punitive damages he must pay Carroll.

Trump's lawyers requested on December 28 that the transcript of his October 2022 deposition be omitted as evidence from the 2024 trial because he might provide new testimony. On January 4, 2024, Judge Kaplan denied the request as frivolous. That morning, Trump posted 31 links on Truth Social to negative stories and online posts about Carroll, as well as video clips stripped of context to make her statements about sexual assault seem fetishistic. On January 6, Trump mocked Carroll at a political rally for not screaming during the "made up" attack. That night, the judge ruled that Trump's lawyers could not argue before the jury that Trump did not rape Carroll. On January 9, Kaplan further ruled that the defense could not argue about Carroll's choice of lawyer, who was paying her legal fees, her romantic/sexual proclivities, or that Trump did not sexually abuse her or act with actual malice when making disparaging comments about her. Discussion of DNA evidence by either party was also barred. The judge affirmed that, contrary to implications by the defense, the trial would not be a "do over" of past proceedings and was to focus (as established) on additional damages owed to Carroll. Additionally on January 14, Kaplan ruled that Trump could not present Anderson Cooper's interview with Carroll or suggest she hoped to boost book sales.

On January 12, 2024, Carroll's lawyer asked Judge Kaplan to ensure that if Trump testified, Trump first be required to tell the jury that he would keep his comments to the matter at hand and not make barred arguments, saying "his recent statements and behavior [e.g. in his New York business trial] strongly suggest that he will seek to sow chaos". Carroll's lawyer also asked that Trump be required to admit he sexually abused Carroll and disparaged her with actual malice. Also on January 12, the judge denied a request from Trump to delay the trial by a week so he could attend the funeral of his mother-in-law, prompting an incendiary Truth Social post. On January 13, Carroll's lawyer argued that Trump's counsel misrepresented the reason for his unavailability on January 17, as a campaign event was scheduled for that day. On January 14, the judge granted a continuance allowing Trump to testify on January 22, even if all other matters in the trial had concluded.

After his being frequently mentioned by the defense in the first trial, on January 13, lawyer George Conway said he would be "admitted into evidence" in the case. On January 15, Tacopina withdrew from Trump's counsel. A few days later, Tacopina told MSNBC that "It was just my time," and said he had withdrawn for both personal and moral reasons.

=== Trial (January 2024) ===
The trial began on January 16, 2024, with Trump in attendance and Judge Lewis A. Kaplan presiding. A nine-member jury was selected, again being anonymous even to the lawyers and judge, who recommended using nicknames for further protection. Ahead of opening statements, Trump's Truth Social account made 22 posts about Carroll, which the latter's counsel cited in opening statements. Habba argued that Carroll's attackers were not inspired by Trump because Carroll was first attacked online before Trump denied her allegations. Habba insinuated that Carroll wanted "Trump to pay her for the mean tweets". The judge scolded Habba for repeating some arguments about topics he had already ruled on.

On January 17, Carroll testified and was cross-examined. Her counsel complained that during testimony, Trump could be heard saying things like "witch hunt" and "con job"; he also reportedly pounded the table. The judge warned Trump that he could force him to leave. Trump replied that he "would love it". Trump posted on Truth Social that he felt obligated to attend "every moment" of the trial, in addition to attacks on the judge and asserting that he was the one who was owed damages. (Note: Trump attacked the judge for being a Bill Clinton appointee (as he had during the CNN town hall) and alleged he had Trump derangement syndrome (TDS), as he had done a few days earlier. According to CNN's Chris Cillizza, TDS "is just the preferred nomenclature of Trump defenders who view those who oppose him and his policies as nothing more than the blind hatred of those who preach tolerance and free speech".) (Note: Judge Kaplan corrected Habba on trial procedure multiple times, including the process of entering evidence.)

Trump did not attend trial on January 18, as he attended his mother-in-law's funeral. A Northwestern University professor serving as an expert witness for Carroll argued that $12.1 million could be fairly spent on paying conservative pundits to repair Carroll's reputation. In her cross-examination by Habba, Carroll testified that she would prefer to have the reputation she did before accusing Trump as opposed to the popularity she gained, which she said "lowered" her reputation. After that day's proceedings, the court adjourned for the week.

During the trial, Habba again targeted the connection between Carroll and George Conway, prompting the latter to state that "there's no secret there." On January 19, Habba requested a mistrial in this case on the basis that Carroll had deleted emails containing death threats. (Judge Kaplan eventually denied the request for a mistrial; he explained that starting the trial over again would not remedy the deleted emails.) In a January 20 court filing, Roberta Kaplan said she intended to present new evidence on January 22, including out-of-court comments by Trump during the trial.

On January 22, court proceedings ended early because a juror and Habba reported they were feeling unwell. Afterwards, Trump made numerous Truth Social posts disparaging Carroll. Habba requested that trial not be held on January 23, as Trump would be involved with the New Hampshire primary that day. On the night of January 24, Trump posted 37 times to Truth Social about Carroll.

On January 25, Carroll's counsel cited Trump testimony from the New York civil real-estate trial in which he argued he was worth billions of dollars, supporting Carroll's request for $10 million or more in damages as being relatively conservative. Carroll's team rested its case that day. Trump briefly testified, saying he stood by his 2022 testimony that Carroll's claim was a "hoax" and a "con job". He also said he had never instructed anyone to hurt Carroll and (in a comment stricken from the record) that he "just wanted to defend" himself, his family and the presidency. The defense then rested its case.

Trump arrived late on January 26. As Habba talked out of turn, the judge told her she was "on the verge of spending some time in the lockup". Shortly afterward, minutes into Roberta Kaplan's closing argument, during which she argued for $12 million in damages, Trump suddenly stood up and left the courtroom.

=== Verdict and aftermath (January 2024–present) ===
On January 26, 2024, the jury deliberated for three hours and awarded Carroll $7.3 million in emotional damages, $11 million in reputation-related damages, and $65 million in punitive damages, totaling $83.3 million. The jury found Trump had committed sexual abuse and forcible touching, two of the three elements of Carroll's battery claim. Trump said he would appeal.

The judge advised the jurors not to disclose that they had served on the trial and forbade them from revealing other jurors' identities.

In a January 29 letter to Judge Kaplan, Habba cited an article from the New York Post asserting that Kaplan, as a senior litigation partner, had served as something like a mentor to junior litigation associate Roberta Kaplan during their nearly two years of overlapping time at the Paul, Weiss, Rifkind, Wharton & Garrison law firm in the 1990s. The following day, Roberta Kaplan called the allegations "utterly baseless" and said she could not recall directly interacting with Lewis Kaplan at all during their shared time at the firm. Habba said Roberta Kaplan's response had seemingly resolved the issue.

On January 30, New York Governor Kathy Hochul mentioned the case during a bill-signing ceremony for a law expanding the state's legal definition of rape to include nonconsensual vaginal, anal, and oral contact, effective non-retroactively on September 1, 2024.

On February 19, a lawyer for Carroll stated on MSNBC that their team was continuing to monitor Trump in a legal capacity, as he had that preceding weekend repeated his claim that he had not known Carroll prior to when she made her allegation against him.

==== Efforts to reduce, stay or overturn judgment (February–April 2024) ====
On February 23, 2024, arguing that the penalty would likely be reduced or rescinded, Trump's lawyers requested a suspension of the payment deadline until a month after Kaplan was to rule on post-trial motions (scheduled to be done by March 7), or allowing a lower payment around $24–40 million. On February 24, Judge Kaplan denied the stay on the basis that the payment remained unsecured and Trump's team had not "first ... afforded [Carroll] a meaningful opportunity to be heard". (Note: On February 29, Carroll's lawyers argued against a delay on the basis that it could hinder a successful transaction, citing uncertainty around Trump's finances, especially regarding the $454 million judgment against him in the New York civil fraud case. On March 2, Trump's team argued that Carroll's team was being inconsistent because they previously cited Trump's testimony in the New York civil fraud case about his wealth (made prior to the $454 million judgment).)

On March 5, Trump's lawyers requested a reduction of damages or that a new trial be held on the basis that evidence about Trump's state of mind while commenting about Carroll had been excluded. According to Trump's team, the judge failed to instruct the jury to determine whether he acted with malice as defined by common law, which dictates that it was his "sole, exclusive desire to harm" Carroll. On March 7, the judge denied the request, stating that Trump had "waited until 25 days after the jury verdict" to file the motion.

On April 25, Kaplan upheld the judgment, finding it to pass "constitutional muster", and denied a motion for a new trial, calling the defense's arguments both legally and factually "entirely without merit". While Trump claimed that the awarded damages were excessive, Kaplan disagreed and cited "evidence that Mr. Trump used the office of the presidency — the loudest 'bully pulpit' in America and possibly the world — to issue multiple statements castigating Ms. Carroll". He further stated that:

Trump's malicious and unceasing attacks on Ms. Carroll were disseminated to more than 100 million people. ... They included public threats and personal attacks, and they endangered Ms. Carroll's health and safety. The jury was entitled to conclude that Mr. Trump derailed the career, reputation, and emotional well-being of one of America's most successful and prominent advice columnists and authors.

==== Appeal effort (March 2024–present) ====
On March 8, 2024, Trump filed an appeal notice and secured a $91.63 million bond (based on the 110% typically required by the district court to cover interest), underwritten by a subsidiary of the insurance company Chubb. (Note: If the appeal failed, 9% annual interest would accumulate. It is likely that Trump guaranteed repayment to Chubb, possibly with collateral.) On March 11, Carroll's lawyers asked the judge to approve the bond but requested the nullification of text in the bond agreement which added a 30-day delay to the damages payment deadline (following the appeal), plus an addition of 30 days for Chubb to pay it if Trump could not. The judge ordered that this stipulation be removed and approved the bond the following day. (Note: Per the bond terms, Chubb would only secure this appeal. The company's chief executive officer, Evan Greenberg, stated that the bond was not an endorsement of Trump and had "nothing to do with the underlying merits" of the appeal.)

Trump's lawyers first appealed the case to Kaplan arguing for dismissal or a new case, arguing that evidence was excluded, the jury should not have been instructed on the common-law definition of malice, and that the damages were excessive. On April 25, 2024, Kaplan rejected the appeal.

In September 2024, Trump's counsel argued that the judgment should be overturned on the basis of flawed jury instruction, "highly prejudicial errors", and presidential immunity. In response to Trump's appeal before the Second Circuit, Carroll's team filed a response on January 27, 2025, that argued that presidential immunity does not invalidate the verdict nor release Trump from paying the damages. On April 11, the DOJ filed a motion asking the court to substitute the United States for Trump under the Westfall Act, saying Trump had acted in his official capacity as president when he made the statements about Carroll and therefore had absolute immunity. The court rejected the request in June and later noted that "both Trump and the government waived any right to now move for substitution by failing to request substitution after the case returned to the District Court following earlier appellate proceedings."

After failing to delay the case, Trump's lawyers argued at a June 24, 2025, appeal hearing that Carroll I should be thrown out because of the U.S. Supreme Court's July 1, 2024, ruling on presidential immunity and further that the penalty was excessive. On September 8, 2025, the Second Circuit rejected the appeal.

On December 11, 2025, America First Legal, a conservative think tank founded by Trump adviser Stephen Miller, argued to the Supreme Court that both judgments against Trump should be vacated, arguing that Trump was denied his right to a fair trial by the admittance of allegedly unreliable accusations and the prohibition of the potential rebuttal of Carroll's claims about DNA into evidence. (Note: In his 2023 ruling on the matter, Kaplan pointed out that the incident could have occurred without preserving DNA on the dress for over two decades.)

On April 29, 2026, the Second Circuit denied Trump's motion for an en banc hearing. On May 5, Assistant U.S. Attorney General Brett Shumate filed a joinder as amicus curiae in Trump's motion for a stay of the judgment, saying the Westfall Act would moot the case as the federal government cannot be sued for defamation. On May 6, Trump's counsel asked the Second Circuit to stay its rejection so their client could appeal to the Supreme Court regarding "important questions relating to, without limitation, Presidential immunity and the Westfall Act". On May 11, the court granted a stay of the judgment, citing Carroll's consent as long as Trump increased the bond by $7.46 million to account for interest that would potentially accrue over the next year and a half. On July 28, Trump and the DOJ appealed to the Supreme Court. By November 17, both sides submitted reply briefs ahead of a court review scheduled for December 4. The current session runs through mid-2027.
