= Adult Survivors Act =

New York state law

New York State Legislature
- Full name: AN ACT to amend the civil practice law and rules, in relation to the statute of limitations for civil actions related to certain sexual offenses committed against a person eighteen years of age or older, reviving such actions otherwise barred by the existing statute of limitations and granting trial preference to such actions; and to amend the judiciary law, in relation to directing the chief administrator of the courts to promulgate rules for the timely adjudication of certain revived actions
- Introduced: January 6, 2021
- Assembly voted: May 23, 2022
- Senate voted: April 26, 2022
- Signed into law: May 24, 2022
- Sponsor: Senator Brad Hoylman
- Governor: Kathy Hochul
- Code: Civil Practice Law and Rules
- Section: 214-j
- Resolution: S66A
- Associated bills: A648A
- Website: Text of the act

Status: Current legislation

The Adult Survivors Act (ASA) is New York State legislation enacted in May 2022 which amended state law to allow alleged victims of sexual offenses for which the statute of limitations had lapsed to file civil suits for a one-year period, from November 24, 2022, to November 24, 2023. The act thus expanded the ability of plaintiffs to sue for sexual assault and unwanted sexual contact in the workplace.

== Background and enactment ==
Before 2019, a three-year statute of limitations applied to civil suits for sexual misconduct in New York. In 2019, New York extended the statute of limitations for civil suits arising from sex crimes against adults to 20 years, but this extension was not retroactive.

In 2022, the ASA was enacted. The bill was sponsored by state Senator Brad Hoylman and Assemblymember Linda Rosenthal. It unanimously passed the Senate in April 2022, passed the Assembly on a 140–3 vote in May 2022, and was signed into law by Governor Kathy Hochul.

== Provisions ==
The ASA amended New York's Civil Practice Law and Rules to allow alleged victims of sexual offenses for which the statute of limitations had lapsed to file civil suits for a one-year period (the "lookback window"), from November 24, 2022, to November 24, 2023. The Act also granted trial preference to revived actions and directed the chief administrator of the courts to promulgate rules for their timely adjudication. The ASA is modeled after the New York Child Victims Act of 2019, which established a one-year window (later extended by an additional year) for victims of child sexual abuse to sue, raising claims that otherwise would have been barred by the statute of limitations.

== Subsequent legal developments ==
In 2025, the Appellate Division, Second Department held in Esposito v. Isaac that CPLR 214-j could revive causes of action alleging sexual assault even where a prior timely action based on the same alleged conduct had been dismissed for lack of personal jurisdiction.The court wrote that the statute's use of "every civil claim or cause of action" reflected the Legislature's intent for the revival provision to apply broadly to claims otherwise barred by statutes of limitations.

In 2026, the Appellate Division, Fourth Department held in Brown v. State of New York that a 2024 amendment to the Court of Claims Act exempting ASA claims from certain late-claim requirements did not excuse a claimant from complying with filing and service requirements under Court of Claims Act § 11.

== Notable cases ==
Roughly halfway through the lookback period, relatively few civil lawsuits had been filed under the ASA. However, a large number of ASA complaints were filed just before the lookback period ended on November 24, 2023. Ultimately, more than 3,000 suits were filed under the ASA.

=== Suits against the State ===
Complaints against the State of New York under the ASA were filed in the Court of Claims; as of November 17, 2023, 1,469 claims had been filed in the Court of Claims, mostly naming the New York State Department of Corrections and Community Supervision as a defendant. The many imprisoned and formerly imprisoned women in New York who filed claims under the ASA alleged that guards raped or sexually abused them in prisons and jails. A significant proportion of these ASA claims were raised by former inmates of the Bayview Correctional Facility, which was closed in 2012. A federal survey in 2008 and 2009 found that Bayview had one of the U.S.'s highest rates of prison staff-perpetrated sexual abuse. At least 479 suits filed under the ASA alleged abuse at Rikers Island jail complex.

=== Suits against private defendants ===
By November 22, 2023 (just before the close of the lookback period) the number of suits in New York Supreme Court reached 1,397. On the day the law took effect, writer E. Jean Carroll filed a suit against businessman and politician Donald Trump, the U.S. president, for defamation and battery. On May 9, 2023, a jury in Manhattan federal court found that Trump defamed and sexually abused Carroll, cleared Trump of alleged penile penetration, and ordered Trump to pay her $5 million in damages.

New York City hospitals and health systems were named as defendants in at least 300 lawsuits filed under the ASA.

In 2022, five women used the ASA to sue NBC and Bill Cosby; in the complaint, the women sued Cosby for assault, battery, false imprisonment, and intentional infliction of emotional distress, and sued NBC (which at the time produced The Cosby Show) for negligence. The women allege that Cosby sexually assaulted them at various points from 1969 to 1992. Another woman sued Cosby, NBCUniversal, Kaufman Astoria Studios, and The Carsey-Werner Company in November 2023 under the ASA; the plaintiff alleged that, while she was working as a stand-in at The Cosby Show in the 1980s, Cosby drugged and sexually abused her.

In May 2023, an ex-employee of former New York mayor Rudy Giuliani sued him for alleged sexual battery.

On November 16, 2023, singer Cassie Ventura sued Sean "Diddy" Combs under the Act, alleging that Combs subjected her to a decade-long "cycle of abuse, violence and sex trafficking" not long after they met in 2005. One day after the complaint was filed, the parties settled the suit on undisclosed terms; Combs did not admit any wrongdoing. A second woman sued Combs in November 2023; the woman, who briefly appeared with Combs in a music video, alleged that he sexually assaulted her in 1991. Combs denied the allegation.

In November 2023, musician Axl Rose was sued by Sheila Kennedy, who alleged that Rose sexually assaulted her in 1989. Kennedy previously alleged being assaulted by Rose in her 2016 memoir No One's Pet and in the 2021 documentary Look Away, which covered women who claimed to be sexually abused in the music industry. Rose denied the claim.

In November 2023, an unidentified Jane Doe plaintiff sued Jamie Foxx under the ASA, alleging that Foxx groped her at a rooftop lounge in Manhattan in 2015. Foxx has denied that anything nonconsensual happened.

In June 2023, actor Cuba Gooding Jr. settled an ASA lawsuit against him, brought by a woman who accused him of a rape in 2013. In November 2023, two other women filed separate complaints against Gooding; one alleged a sexual assault and battery in 2018, the other in 2019.

Actor Sebastian Chacon was accused by three women for rape between 2017 and 2022.

In November 2023, former Governor Andrew Cuomo was sued by his former executive assistant Brittany Commisso on the last day of the law's window. Commisso had previously filed a misdemeanor criminal complaint against Cuomo for forcible touching in 2021 but that case was later dismissed.

In November 2023, a former New York City employee sued Mayor Eric Adams, alleging that he sexually assaulted her in 1993, when he was a New York City Transit Police officer. Adams denied the allegation and said he did not recall meeting the accuser.
