= Judge Dalton =

Judge Dalton may refer to:

- Carol Dalton (born 1950), magistrate judge and associate judge of the Superior Court of the District of Columbia
- Roy B. Dalton Jr. (born 1952), judge of the United States District Court for the Middle District of Florida
- Theodore Roosevelt Dalton (1901–1989), judge of the United States District Court for the Western District of Virginia
- Thomas Dalton (judge) (died 1730), English-born judge in Ireland, who became Chief Baron of the Irish Exchequer

== See also ==
- Justice Dalton (disambiguation)
