= Carol Martin (journalist) =

American journalist and news anchor

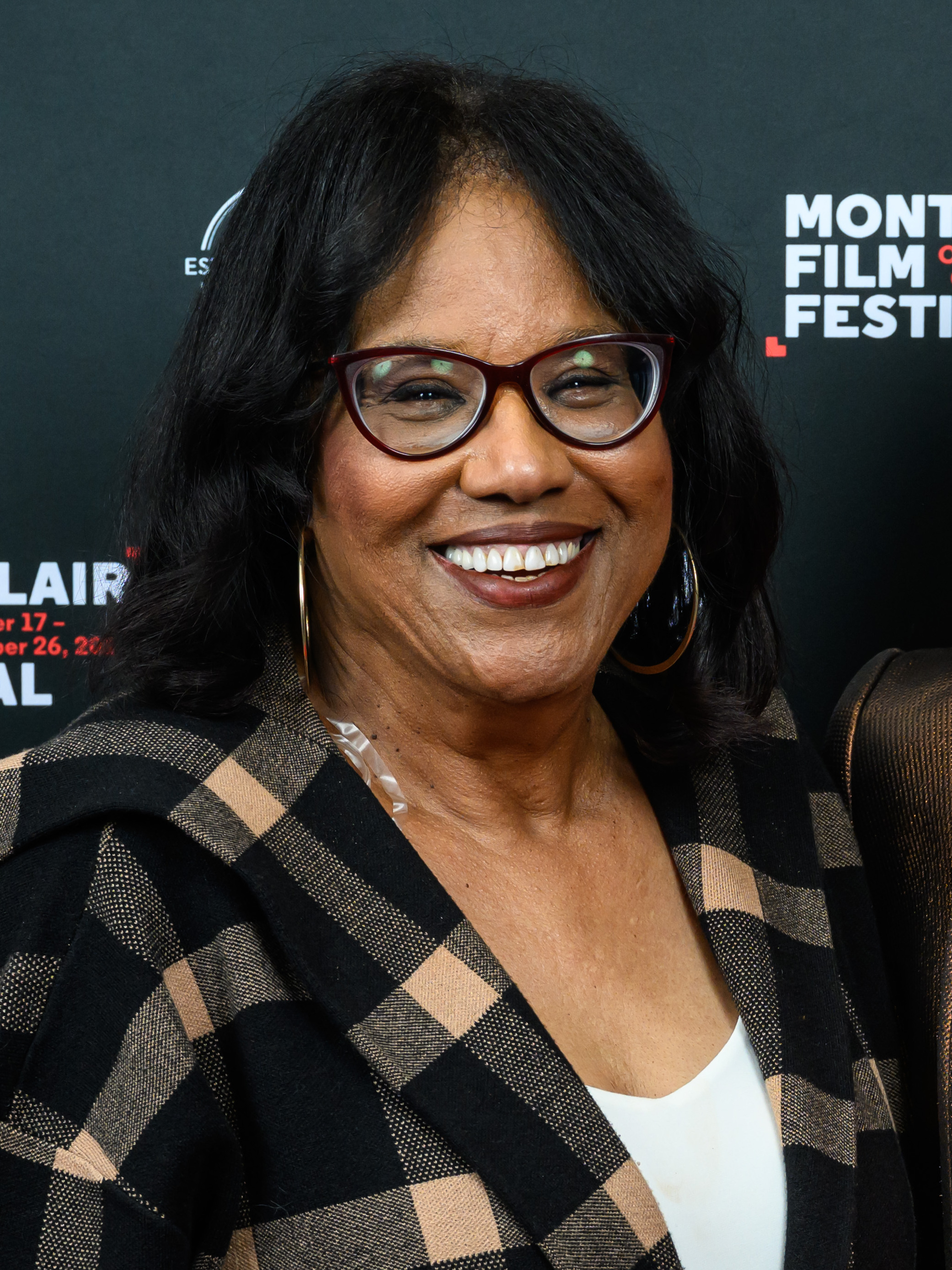
- Martin at the 2025 Montclair Film Festival
- Education: Wayne State University (BA)
- Occupations: News anchor Journalist
- Spouse: Joe Terry

Carol Martin is an American journalist and long-time news anchor for WCBS-TV in New York.

== Biography ==
Martin is the daughter of Idessa and Daniel Martin. Her father was an auto worker for General Motors Corporation in Detroit. She is a graduate of Wayne State University. In 1974, Martin accepted a position with WCBS-TV in New York first as a correspondent and then anchor. In 1994, she left WCBS to host the daily talk show America's Talking and then went to work for WBIS-TV in New York where she was the host of Money Style Power. She also worked on Dateline NBC and as a substitute host on Weekend Today. In 1997, she was named as the host of the second version of The People's Court. In 2000, she was hired by the Fox news affiliate WNYW-TV in New York as co-anchor on the weekday newscast show Fox Five Live.

In 1993, she married Joseph "Joe" Terry, a television director known for his work with The Maury Povich Show, the Oprah Winfrey Show, and The Kelly Clarkson Show.

On May 4, 2023, Martin testified in support of E. Jean Carroll in Carroll's Civil Rape Trial against Donald Trump. Martin was one of two friends that Carroll told shortly after the assault in 1996.
