= Forcible touching =

Criminal forcible touching

Forcible touching, under New York State law, is a sex offense. A person found guilty of it may be sentenced to up to one year in prison, up to three years probation, may be required to register as a sex offender, and may be ordered to comply with orders of protection.

A person is guilty of forcible touching in New York State, under NY Penal Law § 130.52 (2022), when such person "intentionally, and for no legitimate purpose: 1. forcibly touches the sexual or other intimate parts of another person for the purpose of degrading or abusing such person, or for the purpose of gratifying the actor's sexual desire; or 2. subjects another person to sexual contact for the purpose of gratifying the actor's sexual desire and with intent to degrade or abuse such other person while such other person is a passenger on a bus, train, or subway car operated by any transit agency, authority or company, public or private, whose operation is authorized by New York state or any of its political subdivisions."

== History ==
The New York State Legislature created the misdemeanor offense of forcible touching in the Sexual Assault Reform Act of 2000, in response to a series of sexual attacks that took place in Central Park in New York City, including the Puerto Rican Day Parade attacks in June 2000, in which dozens of women were attacked and groped in Central Park by groups of men. Previously, defendants accused of groping were prosecuted under a sex abuse statute with a maximum jail sentence of 90 days. Under the new statute, persons convicted of forcible touching may be sentenced to up to a year in jail.

== Notable cases ==
In October 2020, a jury in the District Court of Suffolk County found Rev. Thomas Humphrey, who served as a minister at Grace Community Church and aired a radio show from Hollywood Baptist Church, both in North Amityville, guilty of forcible touching.

In April 2022, actor Cuba Gooding pleaded guilty in New York Criminal Court to forcibly touching a woman at the New York City nightclub LAVO in 2018. He admitted in court that he "kissed the waitress on her lips" without consent at the nightclub. He entered into a plea deal pursuant to which if he continued alcohol and behavior counseling for six months, he could withdraw his misdemeanor plea and plead guilty to harassment, a lesser offense. If he did not comply with the deal, he faced up to one year in jail.

In 2023, in the case of Carroll v. Trump, former U.S. President Donald Trump was charged with, among other things, forcible touching and was sued for civil battery by E. Jean Carroll. The jury held Trump liable for the sexual abuse and defamation of Carroll, and awarded her $5 million. Because the jury found Trump had committed the greater offense of sexual abuse, it was not required to issue a separate finding on forcible touching.

In February 2024, Ivan Lee, former Olympian, police officer, college coach, and chairman of USA Fencing, was arrested in Brooklyn. He pled guilty that September in Kings County Criminal Court in Brooklyn to forcible touching-intimate parts, and harassment in the second degree-physical contact, of a young woman. In December 2024, Lee also pled guilty in regard to a second incident, to forcible touching-intimate parts and to sexual abuse in the third degree, in this instance in Nassau County District Court in New York.

== Elements ==
A person is guilty of forcible touching in New York State, under NY Penal Law § 130.52 (2022), when such person

intentionally, and for no legitimate purpose:

1. forcibly touches the sexual or other intimate parts of another person for the purpose of degrading or abusing such person, or for the purpose of gratifying the actor's sexual desire; or
2. subjects another person to sexual contact for the purpose of gratifying the actor's sexual desire and with intent to degrade or abuse such other person while such other person is a passenger on a bus, train, or subway car operated by any transit agency, authority or company, public or private, whose operation is authorized by New York state or any of its political subdivisions.

The statute adds that: "For the purposes of this section, forcible touching includes squeezing, grabbing or pinching." In some other states, such nonconsensual acts fall within the statutory definition of laws against sexual abuse or sexual contact.

In addition, an unwanted kiss constitutes forcible touching. It can be inferred from a defendant's conduct that he or she was seeking sexual gratification.

In People v. Sene, 66 AD3d 427, 427-28 (1st Dept 2009), the court concluded that "under general societal norms, the neck qualifies as an intimate part because it is sufficiently personal or private that it would not be touched in the absence of a close relationship between the parties. Moreover, since 'intimacy is a function of behavior and not merely anatomy,' the manner and circumstances of the touching should also be considered...."

The New York Times noted in 2021 that the offense was often charged "in cases involving unwanted sexual advances in public places, and often difficult to prosecute." It was at the time the main charge in approximately 1,400 cases brought annually in New York state, although the cases were dropped almost 40% of the time.

== Penalty ==
Forcible touching is a class A misdemeanor. The maximum punishment for it is one year in prison, and up to three years probation.

== See also ==
- Frotteurism, a paraphilic interest in rubbing against a non-consenting person for sexual pleasure.
