= Noël A. Kramer =

American judge (1945–2018)

Associate Judge of the District of Columbia Court of Appeals
- In office 2005–2011
- Nominated by: George W. Bush
- Preceded by: John M. Steadman
- Succeeded by: Catharine F. Easterly

Judge of the Superior Court of the District of Columbia
- In office 1984–2005
- Nominated by: Ronald Reagan
- Succeeded by: Carol Dalton

Personal details
- Born: Alice Noël Anketell; November 22, 1945 Bay City, Michigan, U.S.
- Died: May 31, 2018 (aged 72)
- Spouse: Franklin David Kramer
- Children: 2
- Education: Vassar College (AB); University of Michigan (JD)

Noël Anketell Kramer (November 22, 1945 – May 31, 2018) was an associate Judge of the District of Columbia Court of Appeals and the Superior Court of the District of Columbia.

== Biography ==
Born and raised in Bay City, Michigan, Alice Noël Anketell graduated from Bay City Central High School in 1963. She earned her bachelor's degree from Vassar College in 1967 and her Juris Doctor degree from the University of Michigan Law School in 1971, working as a computer programmer at AT&T in between. From 1971 to 1976, Kramer was an associate at Wilmer, Cutler & Pickering in Washington, D.C.

In 1976, she joined the United States Attorney's Office for the District of Columbia, where served as Chief of the Superior Court Grand Jury Section from 1980 to 1982. She then transferred to the Fraud Section, where she worked until being appointed to a new seat on the Superior Court in 1984. While serving as Deputy Presiding Judge and Presiding Judge of the Criminal Division, Kramer worked to establish and then presided over the new East of the River Community Court, which hears some misdemeanor cases arising out of arrests east of the Anacostia River in the District of Columbia. Kramer put her name forward for vacancies on the Court of Appeals in 1989 and 1991 and was finally nominated in 2004 to replace John M. Steadman. The Senate did not act on her first nomination, but President Bush renominated her in 2005 and she was confirmed. She retired from the court in 2011.

== Personal life ==
Kramer's husband, Franklin David Kramer, served as Assistant Secretary of Defense for International Security Affairs from 1996 to 2001. They had two children. Judge Kramer died on May 31, 2018, aged 72.

Legal offices
Preceded by John M. Steadman	Associate Judge of the District of Columbia Court of Appeals; 2005–2011	Succeeded by Catharine F. Easterly
