= Innominate jury =

Jury whose members are kept anonymous

An innominate jury, also known as an anonymous jury, is a jury whose members are kept anonymous by court order. This may be requested by the prosecution or defense in order to protect the jury from the media, potential jury tampering, or social pressure to return a particular verdict.

In some cases, the identity of the jury is not revealed to anyone; in other cases, the identity of the jury is revealed to the prosecution and defense, but not released to the public or media.

In most jurisdictions, several criteria are used to determine if an anonymous jury is appropriate. The defendant's involvement in organized crime, the defendant's participation in a group with the capacity to harm jurors, the defendant's past attempts to interfere with the judicial process, the potential that the defendant will get a long jail sentence or substantial fines if convicted, and extensive publicity that could expose jurors to intimidation or harassment are situations in which an innominate jury may be appropriate.

== Notable cases ==
- Leroy Barnes: the 1977 trial of a drug kingpin. Commonly considered the first use of an anonymous jury.
- Operation Family Secrets: a trial of organized-crime-affiliated defendants in Chicago.
- John Gotti
- George Zimmerman's defense team, in Zimmerman's trial for the killing of Trayvon Martin (State of Florida v. George Zimmerman), had requested an anonymous jury, arguing that the jurors may be subject to intimidation due to the intense media and public scrutiny in the case.
- US District Judge Brian Cogan ruled in February 2018 that the trial of accused drug kingpin Joaquín "El Chapo" Guzmán (United States of America v. Joaquín Guzmán Loera), used an innominate and partially sequestered jury.
- State of Minnesota v. Derek Michael Chauvin
- E. Jean Carroll vs. Donald J. Trump
