= Justice Dalton =

Justice Dalton may refer to:

- Jean Dalton (born 1964), justice of the Supreme Court of Queensland
- Llewelyn Dalton (1871–1945), British colonial judge who served as Chief Justice of Tanganyika
- Sidna Poage Dalton (1892–1965), chief justice of the Supreme Court of Missouri

== See also ==
- Judge Dalton (disambiguation)
