= Hardball with Chris Matthews =

American television talk show

- Directed by: Ray Herbert
- Presented by: Chris Matthews
- Country of origin: United States

Production
- Production location: Washington, D.C.
- Running time: 60 minutes (with commercials)

Original release
- Network: America's Talking
- Release: July 5, 1994 – July 15, 1996
- Network: CNBC
- Release: November 1, 1997 – November 5, 1999
- Network: MSNBC
- Release: November 8, 1999 – March 2, 2020
- Network: Substack
- Release: April 17, 2025 – present

Hardball with Chris Matthews is an American television talk show hosted by Chris Matthews. The program premiered on the now-defunct America's Talking network in 1994 (as Politics with Chris Matthews) before moving to CNBC, and then to MSNBC, where it continued to air until its end in 2020. The show took its name from Matthews's 1988 book: Hardball: How Politics Is Played Told by One Who Knows the Game. The program primarily featured coverage of political issues and headlines, along with discussion from a panel of analysts and political figures.

== History ==
Hardball was broadcast on CNBC from 1997 until 1999, after which the program was moved to MSNBC.

On March 2, 2020, Matthews announced that he had left the program, effective immediately, stating that the "younger generation" was "ready to take the reins", but that he would still "continue to write and talk about politics and cheer on my producers and crew here in Washington in New York and my MSNBC colleagues." His sign-off also included an apology alluding to sexual harassment allegations he had recently faced from a female journalist, remarking that "compliments on a women's appearance that some men, including me, might have once incorrectly thought were OK, were never OK. Not then and certainly not today". The announcement aired in place of the program (which, thus, aired its final full episode the preceding Friday); Steve Kornacki hosted the rest of the hour. The time slot was filled by rotating hosts (under the MSNBC Live banner); on July 9, 2020, it was announced that Joy Reid would host The ReidOut in the time slot, which lasted from July 20, 2020, until February 24, 2025, following Reid's exit.

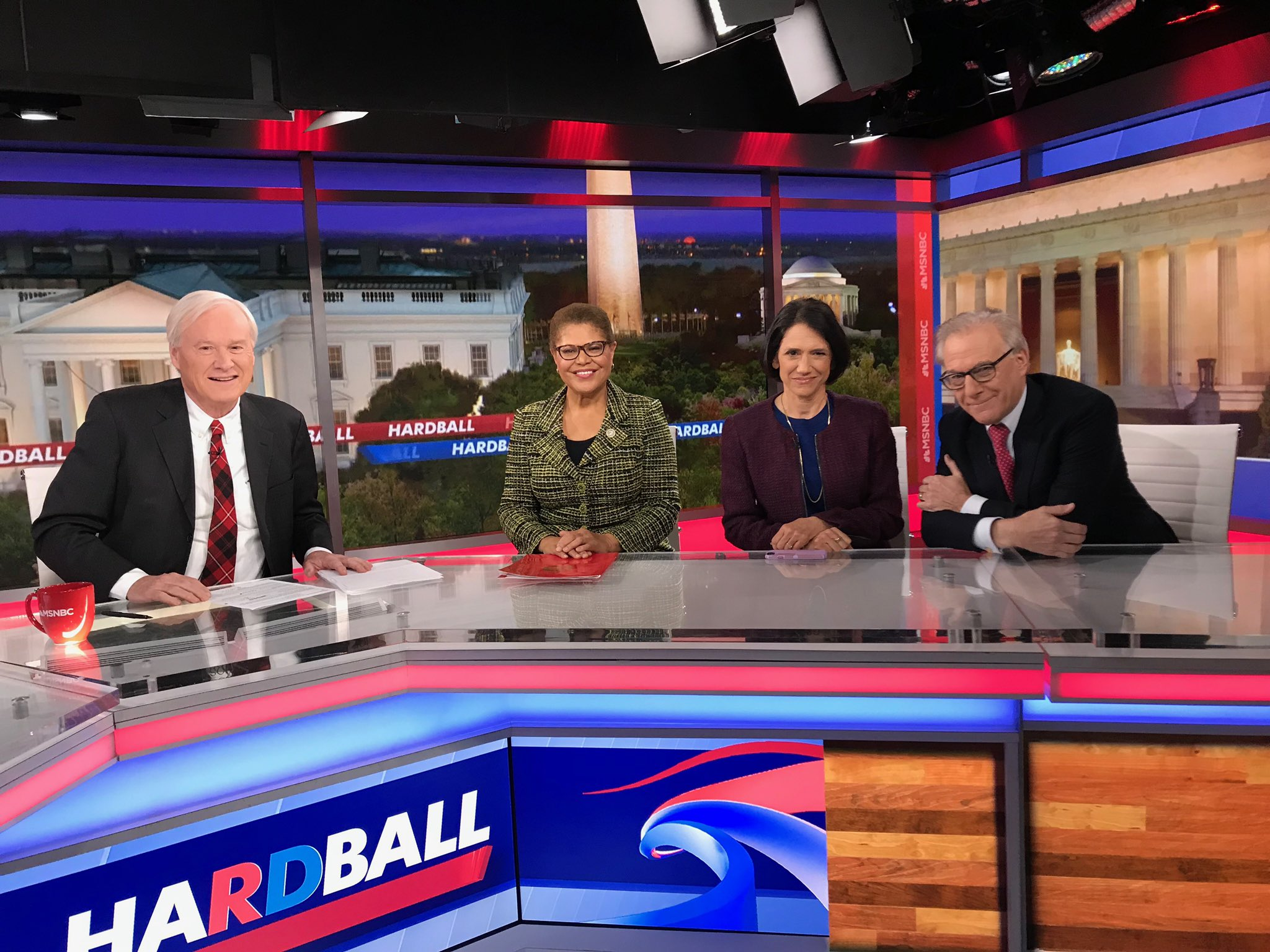
Chris Matthews with panelists, including Congressmember Karen Bass, in 2018.

The Wall Street Journal reported that Matthews had already been considering retirement from the show, possibly after the 2020 presidential election, but that the allegations, as well other controversial remarks he had recently made on-air (such as during an interview of Elizabeth Warren, and comments made comparing Bernie Sanders' Nevada caucus victory to the fall of France to the Nazis), had expedited his departure.

On April 15, 2025, it was announced that Hardball would be revived and would premiere on social media platform Substack in the near future. In a statement on the site, Matthews said "for twenty-some years, I asked tough questions and got a good number of surprising answers, now, I’m about to do it again on Substack, an independent way to ask questions and give you the answers.”

== Notable moments ==
Matthews caused controversy with remarks made off the air at a celebration of Hardball's 10-year anniversary in October 2007. He claimed that the Bush administration—specifically Vice President Cheney's office—had tried to "silence" him by pressuring MSNBC executives to put a stop to Matthews' criticism of the Iraq War. The White House declined to comment.

=== Michele Bachmann ===
On October 17, 2008, Minnesota representative Michele Bachmann gave an interview on Hardball in support of the presidential campaign of Senator John McCain. In speaking of Senator Barack Obama, Bachmann said: "we know that he is the most liberal senator in the United States Senate and that's just after one year of being there ... [with Nancy Pelosi and Harry Reid] you have a Troika of the most leftist administration in the history of our country." In reference to Republican vice-presidential candidate Sarah Palin's comment about "pro-America areas of this great nation", Bachmann was asked which areas are anti-American and responded, "I don't think it's geography. I think it is people who don't like America, who detest America ... you’ll find them in all walks of life all throughout America." When asked by Matthews about Democratic Speaker of the House Pelosi and Senate Majority Leader Reid, Bachmann said, "I am not going to say if they are anti-American or pro-American." When asked, "How many people in the Congress of the United States do you suspect as being anti-American?", she replied, "What I would say is that the news media should do a penetrating exposé and take a look. I wish they would. I wish the American media would take a great look at the views of the people in Congress and find out, are they pro-America or anti-America? I think people would love to see an exposé like that."

Bachmann's comments had an immediate impact on her re-election campaign. A campaign urging Congress to officially censure Bachmann was launched with over 35,000 signatures in the first 24 hours after her Hardball appearance. In less than 72 hours, her congressional election opponent Elwyn Tinklenberg received $740,000 in donations. Tinklenberg said that he heard "in that kind of a call echoes of the House Un-American Activities Committee." However, Bachmann defeated Tinklenberg 46.4% to 43.4% in the November 4, 2008 election.

=== Confrontations ===
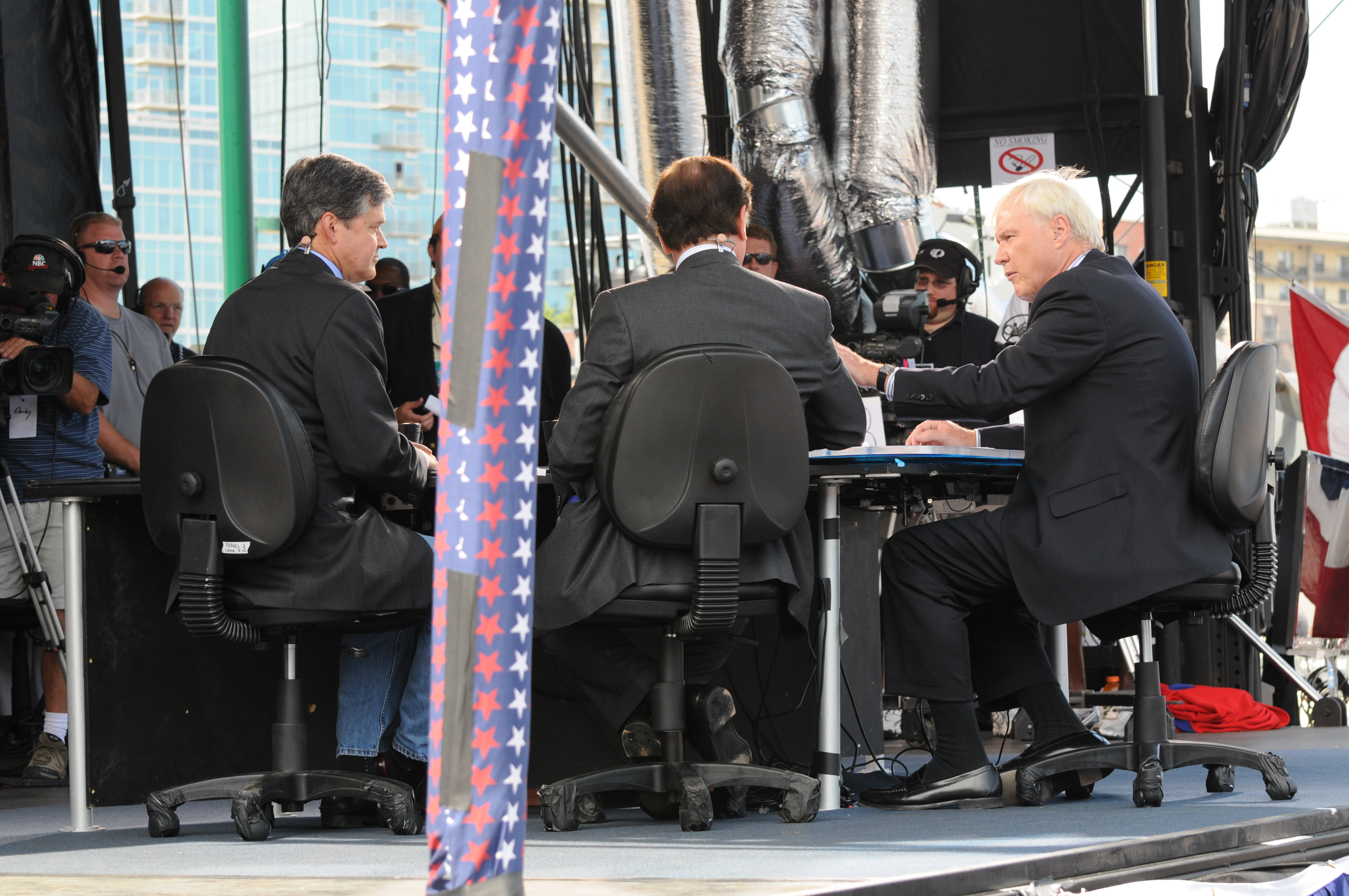
Chris Matthews (right) interviews John Harwood (left) and Howard Fineman (center) on Hardball, while in Denver for the 2008 Democratic National Convention.

==== Michelle Malkin ====
On August 19, 2004, conservative commentator Michelle Malkin appeared on the show and raised the question of whether Democratic candidate John Kerry's Vietnam War wounds could have been "self-inflicted", saying that such questions were "legitimate". Matthews repeatedly asked Malkin if she thought that Kerry "shot himself on purpose" in order to avoid combat or to gain accolades, noting that such an act would constitute a criminal offense. Matthews challenged Malkin to "say to me right now that you believe he shot himself to get credit for a Purple Heart—on purpose." Malkin refused to answer, instead referring to allegations made by some of Kerry's former fellow soldiers. Matthews told Malkin that Hardball "is not a show for this kind of talk." Malkin asked if Matthews didn't wonder whether Kerry's wounds may have been self-inflicted, to which the host responded, "No! I don't, it's never occurred to me."

==== Zell Miller ====
Days later, then-U.S. Senator Zell Miller, (D–Georgia), a Democrat who supported then-Republican President George W. Bush, appeared on Hardball. Miller had just given the keynote address at the Republican convention. Matthews took Miller to task for his statement that soldiers, not reporters, are responsible for freedom of the press, accusing the senator of making the comment only "to get an applause line against the media at a conservative convention." Miller had also criticized Kerry's record on national defense issues during his speech, prompting Matthews to ask if the senator believed that Kerry did not want to "defend the country." During a heated exchange in which each man interrupted the other several times, Miller shouted at Matthews to "get out of my face" and angrily stated that he wished "we lived in the day where you could challenge a person to a duel." He also made reference to the Malkin interview, telling Matthews not to "pull that stuff on me like you did that young lady, when you had her there browbeating her to death. I'm not her."

==== Ann Coulter and Elizabeth Edwards ====
On June 26, 2007, conservative commentator Ann Coulter was the guest when Elizabeth Edwards, wife of then-Democratic presidential candidate John Edwards, made a surprise (per Coulter, afterwards) call to the program. Coulter had made a speech days earlier in which she said, "I was going to have a few comments on the other Democratic presidential candidate John Edwards, but it turns out you have to go into rehab if you use the word 'faggot'." Elizabeth Edwards confronted Coulter about the comment, as well as other comments Coulter had made accusing John Edwards of exploiting his son's death for political gain. Edwards asked Coulter to "stop the personal attacks" and accused her of "lowering the political dialogue" in America. Coulter responded that Edwards' complaints were an attempt to raise money for the presidential campaign, and questioned why the candidate himself was not making the call.

==== Kevin James ====
On May 15, 2008, Matthews had a confrontation with radio broadcaster Kevin James when he appeared on the show. At issue was a controversial speech made by President George W. Bush in Israel, where he appeared to claim that statements made by United States presidential candidate Barack Obama were tantamount to Neville Chamberlain's actions of "Nazi appeasement" in 1938. James agreed with the notion that Obama's positions were like Chamberlain's policy of appeasement but was unable to elaborate on what exactly Chamberlain did.

== In popular culture ==
The show has been spoofed by Saturday Night Live, with Darrell Hammond portraying Chris Matthews. One of the first instances was during the Florida election recount, following the unclear results of the 2000 United States presidential election.

Hardball appeared on the October 9, 2005 episode of The West Wing, "Message of the Week" (which was written by frequent Hardball guest Lawrence O'Donnell), with Chris Matthews playing himself. He interviews fictional Republican presidential candidate Arnold Vinick (played by Alan Alda) and pressures him about his views on immigration. The tough nature of Matthews' questions prompts the character of Josh Lyman, a strategist for Vinick's opponent, to shout: "Yeah! Welcome to Hardball, Arnie!"

The show was featured in the February 22, 2007 30 Rock episode "Hard Ball", in which series character Jenna Maroney came on the show to explain about how she was misquoted in Maxim magazine about US military troops. She humiliated herself even further when she confused Barack Obama with Osama bin Laden, after she mentioned whom she would support for U.S. president in 2008.

The 2008 film Swing Vote contains several segments of Chris Matthews delivering commentary on Hardball that relates to the film's plot line. Matthews received a credited cameo for recording the segments.

== The Hardball Award ==
The Hardball Award is an award created in 2009 that recognizes an individual "who displays a combination of guts and political moxie to win not just the day but our fondest admiration." The award is not given on a regular basis; instead, it is given when someone displays character consistent with the award.

Recipients:

- Roland Burris: Given on January 9, 2009, for his efforts to retain his seat, which was appointed controversially by Rod Blagojevich.
- Chesley "Sully" Sullenberger: Given on January 16, 2009, for his courage in his successful emergency water landing of US Airways Flight 1549 on the Hudson River.
- Rep. Gary Ackerman: Given on February 6, 2009, for speaking out against the U.S. Securities and Exchange Commission (SEC) for their failure in regulating and catching Bernard Madoff's ponzi scheme.
- Hillary Clinton: Given on February 18, 2009, for her service to her country and her historic run at the presidency.
- Rush Limbaugh: Given on March 5, 2009, for taking a modest mention by the president and turning it into media gold.
- Debbie Wasserman Schultz: Given on March 24, 2009, for balancing motherhood, a successful House campaign, continuous voting, and presidential support for both Hillary Clinton and Barack Obama while undergoing seven surgeries for breast cancer.
- Barack Obama: Given on April 2, 2009, for "firing" General Motors CEO Rick Wagoner, when Wagoner proved ineffective at reorganizing the company.
