= Chris Matthews =

American news anchor (born 1945)

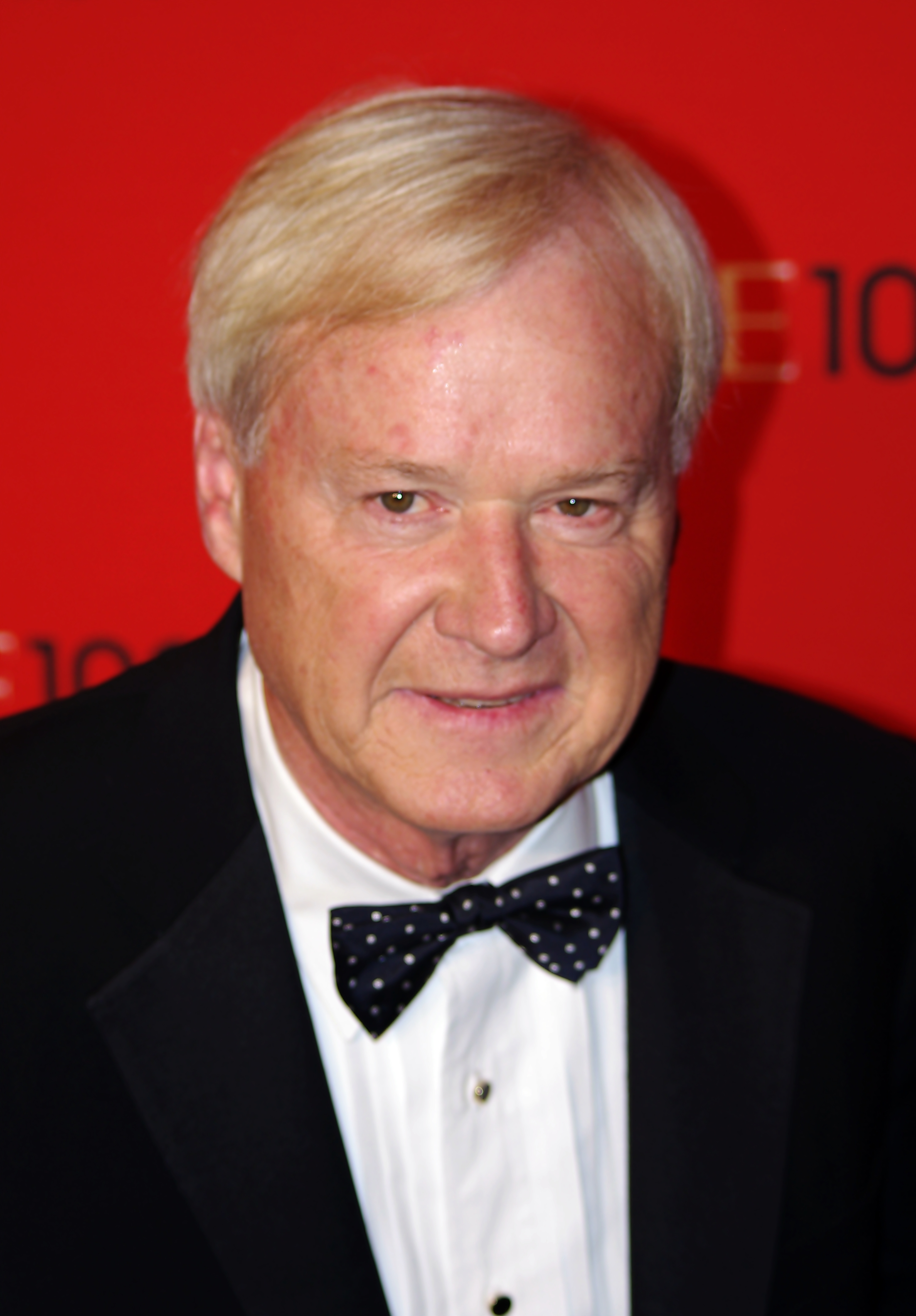
- Matthews at the 2011 Time 100 Gala
- Born: Christopher John Matthews; December 17, 1945 (age 80); Philadelphia, Pennsylvania, U.S.
- Education: College of the Holy Cross (BA)
- Occupations: News anchor; political commentator
- Years active: 1994–2020; 2021–present
- Employers: NBCUniversal, Comcast
- Television: Hardball with Chris Matthews
- Political party: Democratic
- Spouse: Kathleen Cunningham (m. 1980)
- Children: 3
- Relatives: Jim Matthews (brother)

Christopher John Matthews (born December 17, 1945) is an American political commentator, retired talk show host, and author. Matthews hosted his weeknight hour-long talk show, Hardball with Chris Matthews, on America's Talking and later on MSNBC, from 1997 until 2020. He announced on his final episode that he was retiring, following an accusation that he had made inappropriate comments to a Hardball guest four years earlier.

== Early life and education ==
Matthews was born in Philadelphia, Pennsylvania, the son of Mary Teresa (née Shields) and Herb Matthews, a court reporter. Matthews's father was raised Episcopalian and was of English and Scots-Irish ancestry, while his mother was from an Irish Catholic family. He and his siblings were raised in the Catholic faith.

Matthews attended La Salle College High School. He then graduated from the College of the Holy Cross in Worcester, Massachusetts, with a Bachelor of Arts in economics in 1967 and completed graduate work in economics at the University of North Carolina at Chapel Hill. Matthews was also a visiting fellow at Harvard University's Institute of Politics.

Matthews served in the United States Peace Corps in Swaziland from 1968 to 1970 as a trade development adviser.

Matthews holds 34 honorary degrees from numerous universities and colleges.

== Career ==
=== Political career ===
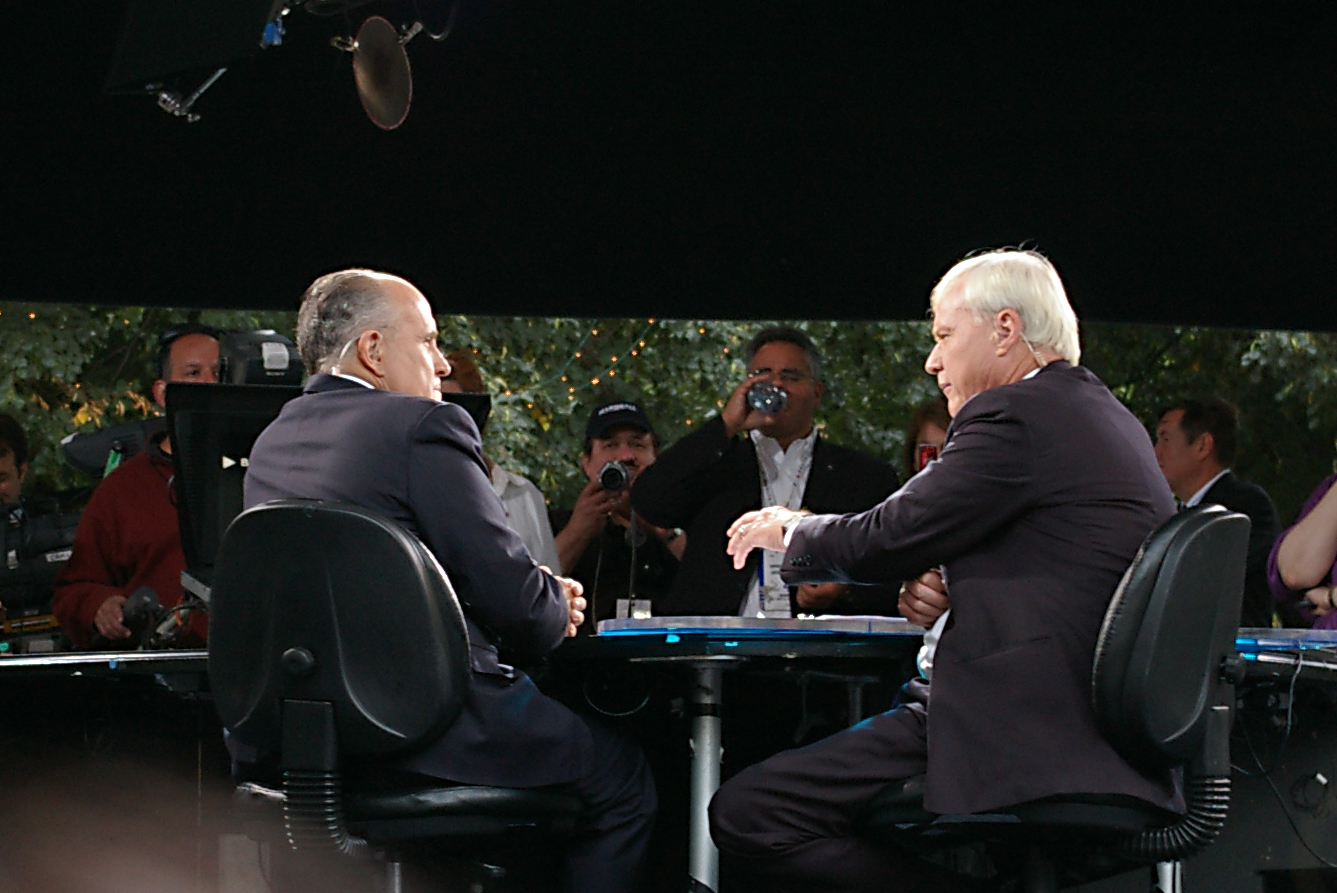
Matthews interviewing Rudy Giuliani during the 2008 Republican National Convention

When Matthews first arrived in Washington, D.C., he worked as an officer with the United States Capitol Police. Subsequently, Matthews served on the staffs of four Democratic Members of Congress, including Senators Frank Moss and Edmund Muskie. In 1974, Matthews mounted an unsuccessful campaign for Pennsylvania's 4th congressional district seat in the U.S. House of Representatives in which he received about 24% of the vote in the primary. Matthews was a presidential speechwriter during the Carter Administration, and later worked for six years as Chief of Staff to longtime Speaker of the House of Representatives Tip O'Neill, playing a direct role in many key political battles with the Reagan Administration.

Matthews has said, "I'm more conservative than people think I am ... I voted for George W. in 2000." Salon.com called him the "most conservative voice" on MSNBC's primetime lineup. Matthews has been accused by Media Matters for America of having panels of guests that skew to the right and of supporting Republicans in his own questions and comments.

On the April 14, 2008, edition of The Colbert Report, Matthews alluded to a possible run for the United States Senate from Pennsylvania. On November 28, 2008, Matthews contacted senior staffers of Barack Obama's campaign about a possible Senate run. On January 7, 2009, The New York Times reported that Matthews told his staffers that he would not run for the Senate.

=== Newspaper journalist ===
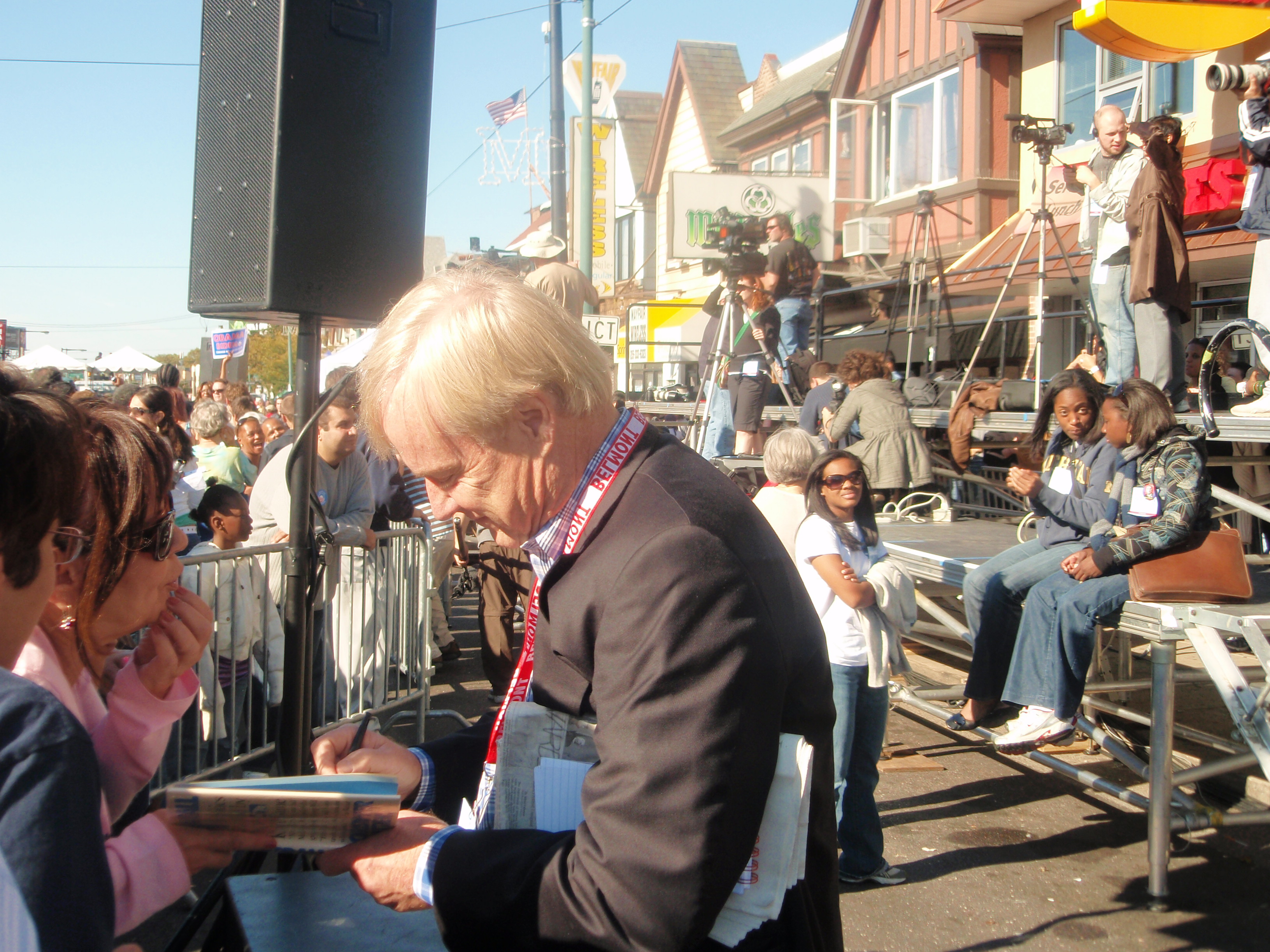
Matthews signs autographs for fans in 2008

Matthews worked in print media for 15 years, spending 13 years as Washington, D.C., bureau chief for the San Francisco Examiner (1987–2000) and two years as a nationally syndicated columnist for the San Francisco Chronicle. Matthews covered the fall of the Berlin Wall, the first all-races election in South Africa, and the Good Friday Peace Talks in Northern Ireland. In 1997 and 1998, his research in the National Archives produced a series of exclusives on the Nixon presidential tapes. Matthews covered American presidential election campaigns from 1988 until his retirement in 2020.

=== Author ===
He is the author of eight best-selling books:

- Hardball: How Politics is Played, Told by One Who Knows the Game (1988)
- Kennedy & Nixon: The Rivalry that Shaped Postwar America (1996)
- Now, Let Me Tell You What I Really Think (2001)
- American: Beyond our Grandest Notions (2002)
- Life's a Campaign: What Politics Has Taught Me About Friendship, Rivalry, Reputation, and Success (2007)
- Jack Kennedy: Elusive Hero (2011)
- Tip and the Gipper: When Politics Worked (2013)
- Bobby Kennedy: A Raging Spirit (2017)

Jack Kennedy: Elusive Hero spent 12 weeks on The New York Times bestseller list. The book was lauded by critics. "Matthews excels in capturing the tribalism of the Irish Catholic culture and experience Kennedy both absorbed and overcame as he made his way ... [and] is at his best in describing political dynamics," The Washington Post said. "Matthews proves a compelling storyteller," said The Boston Globe. "Matthews has produced a valuable addition to the literature about the life and career of our 35th president," said The Christian Science Monitor. "Matthews's stirring biography reveals Kennedy as a 'fighting prince never free from pain, never far from trouble, and never accepting the world he found,'" said Publishers Weekly.

=== Television talk show host ===
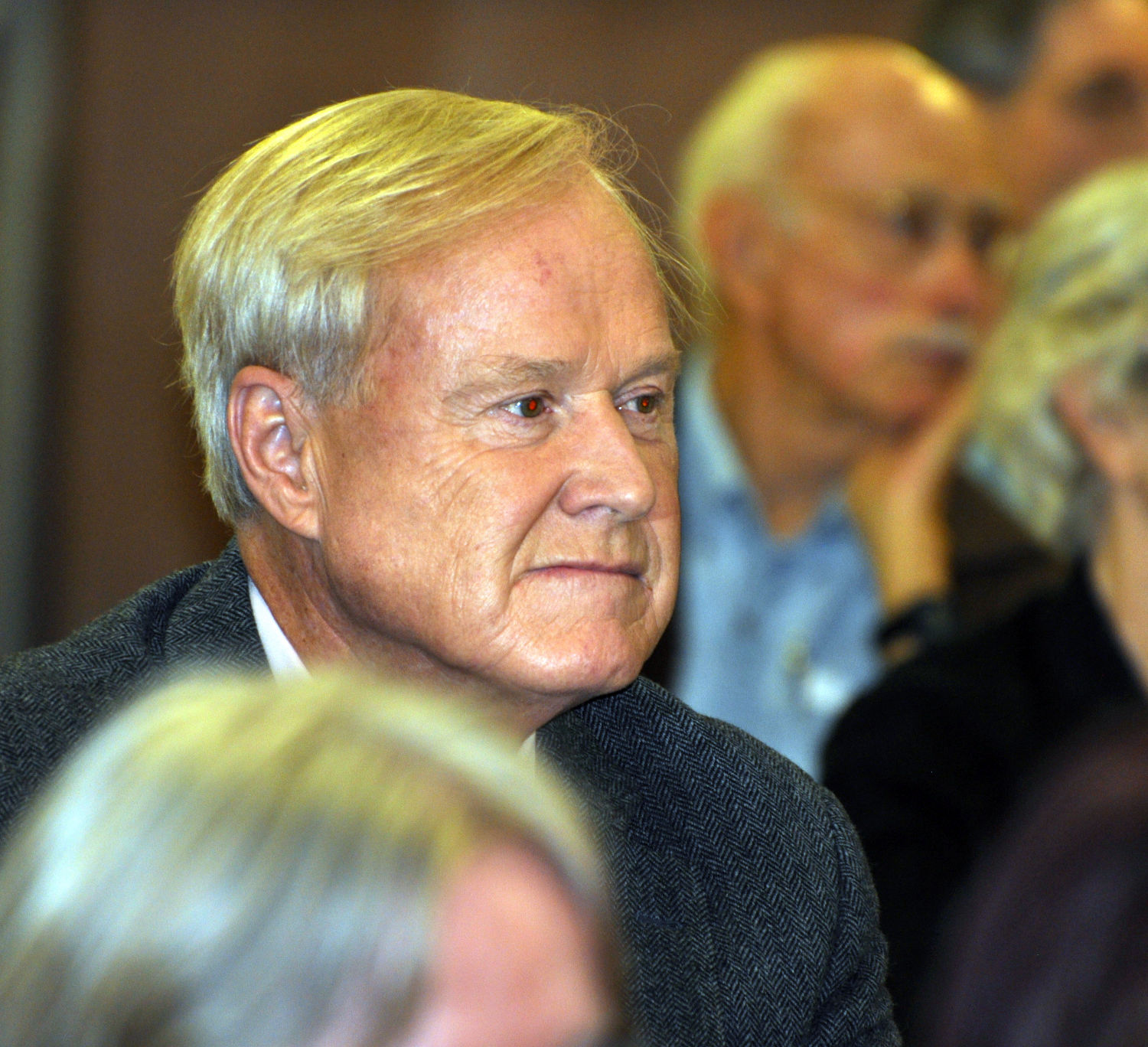
Matthews in 2015

In 1997, Matthews began his own weeknight talk show, Hardball with Chris Matthews, which originally aired on America's Talking and then moved to MSNBC. Hardball with Chris Matthews featured pundits and elected officials as guests.

The Chris Matthews Show aired in syndication on weekends from 2002 until 2013. The show was formatted as a political roundtable consisting of four journalists and Matthews, who served as the moderator.

In 2004, at the Democratic National Convention, Matthews predicted that he had "just seen the first Black president." The Huffington Post reported on Matthews's emotional expressions of support for Barack Obama during the 2008 Presidential election, quoting him as saying: "I have to tell you, you know, it's part of reporting this case, this election, the feeling most people get when they hear Barack Obama's speech. My, I felt this thrill going up my leg. I mean, I don't have that too often."

While discussing proposed healthcare reform on the December 17, 2009, edition of Hardball, Matthews stated, "The Republicans will know they have lost ... Let them keep score and it's easy. It's complicated when liberals get to keep score. We're always arguing. Well, I'm a liberal, too."

In March 2012, Matthews described himself as a centrist during an episode of his MSNBC talk show Hardball. That statement was questioned by Mediaite's Josh Feldman directly afterward, based on Matthews's frequent condemnation of right-wing political figures and his emotional expression of support for Barack Obama's presidential campaign. Feldman observed that Matthews has criticized liberals such as Hillary Clinton and occasionally even Barack Obama, and that this could explain Matthews's description of himself as a "centrist".

In 2013, Matthews announced that he had signed a long-term contract extension with MSNBC but that he would no longer host The Chris Matthews Show in order to focus his efforts on Hardball, writing books, and producing documentaries. The final episode of The Chris Matthews Show aired on July 21.

In December 2018, Matthews interviewed U.S. Representative Tulsi Gabbard, who stated she was "seriously considering" running for President.

On February 7, 2020, during a panel discussion following a Democratic Party presidential candidate debate in New Hampshire, Matthews referenced Bernie Sanders's praise for aspects of Fidel Castro's Cuba, saying "if Castro and the Reds had won the Cold War, there would [have been] executions in Central Park and I might have been one of the ones getting executed and certain other people would be there cheering, OK? So I have a problem with people who took the other side." His remarks were mocked by left-wing commentators.

During the opening monologue of his Monday, March 2, 2020, show, Matthews announced his immediately effective retirement from Hardball. Matthews alluded to claims of inappropriate comments that trailed him for years, resurfacing when freelance journalist Laura Bassett accused Matthews of making sexist remarks when she was a guest on “Hardball” in 2016. MSNBC had executed a long-term contract with Matthews, in 2013, to retain him with the network at least through the 2016 election, and he was expected to retire after the 2020 election cycle, with an exit after Election Day in November 2020 likely. Following his resignation, Matthews garnered well-wishes from professional colleagues in the news media and others, including from Congresswoman Tulsi Gabbard, who noted Matthews's willingness to "criticize the neocon pro-war agenda."

In September 2022, Matthews returned to MSNBC as a political analyst making appearances on the network's "Morning Joe" program.

== Controversies ==
=== Inappropriate comments ===
Throughout Matthews's career he has been criticized for making inappropriate comments about women in politics including Melania Trump, Sarah Palin, and Erin Burnett.

In October 2016, Laura Bassett appeared on Matthews's program to comment on sexual assault allegations against then candidate Donald Trump. In February 2020, Bassett alleged that prior to that program, Matthews made inappropriate remarks about her makeup, clothing, and dating life. As she was having her television studio makeup applied, Matthews purportedly asked her: "Why haven't I fallen in love with you yet?" Bassett claims that when she laughed nervously and said nothing, Matthews followed up to the makeup artist with: "Keep putting makeup on her, I'll fall in love with her." In 2017, Bassett had previously published a text about the incident, which did not identify Matthews by name.

In December 2017, details surfaced of a 1999 settlement Matthews's employer, MSNBC, reached with a female producer of Matthews's program who alleged Matthews made inappropriate comments about her in front of colleagues in the workplace. MSNBC denied making a settlement, but acknowledged Matthews had been reprimanded for the comments.

In 2018 during a setup for a television interview with Hillary Clinton, Matthews stated out loud "where was the Cosby pill" that he brought with him.

=== Nazi metaphors ===
On February 22, 2020, commenting on the 2020 Nevada Democratic caucuses, Matthews invoked Winston Churchill's feeling of disbelief following the fall of France to the Nazis in 1940 as a metaphor for the feeling of disbelief experienced by establishment figures in the Democratic Party to Bernie Sanders's victory in the state. As members of Sanders's family were killed by the Nazis during the Holocaust, his comparison was viewed as insensitive and prompted widespread negative reactions on Twitter calling for him to be removed from MSNBC. Amid mounting criticism, Matthews issued an on-air apology to Sanders and his supporters on February 24. Sanders did not directly respond to the remarks.

== Personal life ==
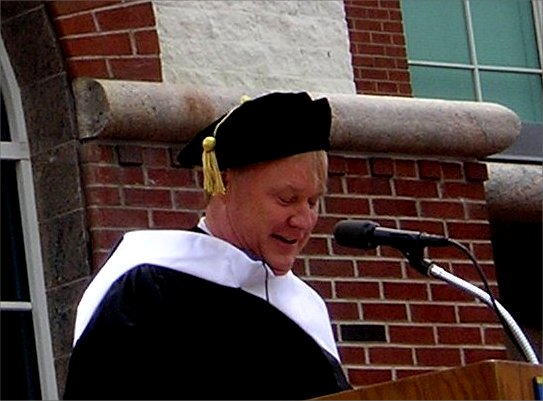
Matthews at Quinnipiac University Commencement 2005

Matthews has been married since 1980 to Kathleen Matthews, who was a news anchor at WJLA-TV, the ABC affiliate in Washington, D.C., before accepting a position as an executive vice president with Marriott International. In 2015, Kathleen Matthews launched an unsuccessful campaign for the Democratic nomination to run for a House seat in Maryland's 8th congressional district, which was won by progressive Jamie Raskin. The couple have three children: Michael, Thomas, and Caroline. One of his four brothers Jim Matthews, a Republican, is a former county commissioner in Montgomery County, Pennsylvania.

In 2002, Matthews was hospitalized with malaria, which he contracted on one of his visits that year to Africa.

Matthews was the commencement speaker at Ohio State University on May 4, 2014 and Merrimack College on May 15, 2015.

Matthews was a senior fellow at the Kettering Foundation, an American non-partisan research foundation from 2024–2025.

== Awards ==
Matthews is the recipient of several awards, including The Pennsylvania Society's Gold Medal for Distinguished Achievement in 2005, the Abraham Lincoln Award from the Union League of Philadelphia, the David Brinkley Award for Excellence in Broadcast Journalism, the John F. Kennedy Memorial Award, and the 2016 Tip O'Neill Irish Diaspora Award.

== Honorary degrees ==
Chris Matthews has received more than 30 honorary degrees, among which are:

Date	School	Location	Degree
June 14, 2003	Drexel University	Pennsylvania	Doctorate
2003	College of the Holy Cross	Massachusetts	Doctorate
2004	Hobart and William Smith Colleges	New York	Doctorate
May 22, 2005	Quinnipiac University	Connecticut	Doctor of Humane Letters (DHL)
May 20, 2006	Fordham University	New York	Doctorate
May 10, 2008	Old Dominion University	Virginia	Doctor of Humane Letters (DHL)
May 16, 2008	Washington University in St. Louis	Missouri	Doctor of Humane Letters (DHL)
2008	Temple University	Pennsylvania	Doctor of Humane Letters (DHL)
2009	Saint Joseph's University	Pennsylvania	Doctor of Communication
2012	Howard University	District of Columbia	Doctor of Humane Letters (DHL)
May 20, 2013	Suffolk University	Massachusetts	Doctor of Laws (LL.D.)
May 4, 2014	Ohio State University	Ohio	Doctor of Communication
May 18, 2014	University of Rochester	New York	Doctor of Letters (D.Litt.)
September 28, 2014	La Salle University	Pennsylvania	Doctorate
May 15, 2015	Merrimack College	Massachusetts	Doctorate
June 11, 2015	Peirce College	Pennsylvania	Doctorate

== Bibliography ==
- Matthews, Chris (2021). This Country: My Life in Politics and History. New York: Simon & Schuster. p. 352. ISBN 978-1-9821-3484-6.
- Matthews, Christopher (2017). Bobby Kennedy: A Raging Spirit. New York: Simon & Schuster. p. 416. ISBN 978-1-5011-1186-0.
- Matthews, Christopher (2013). Tip and the Gipper: When Politics Worked. New York: Simon & Schuster. ISBN 978-1-4516-9599-1.
- Matthews, Christopher (2011). Jack Kennedy: Elusive Hero. New York: Simon & Schuster. ISBN 978-1-4516-3508-9.
- Matthews, Christopher (2007). Life's a Campaign: What Politics Has Taught Me About Friendship, Rivalry, Reputation, and Success (1st ed.). New York: Random House. ISBN 978-1-4000-6528-8.
- Matthews, Christopher (2002). American: Beyond Our Grandest Notions. New York: Free Press. ISBN 0-7432-4086-3.
- Matthews, Christopher (2001). Now, Let Me Tell You What I Really Think (1st ed.). New York: Free Press. ISBN 0-684-86236-0.
- Matthews, Christopher (1996). Kennedy & Nixon: The Rivalry that Shaped Postwar America. New York: Simon & Schuster. ISBN 0-684-81030-1.
- Matthews, Christopher (1988). Hardball: How Politics Is Played, Told By One Who Knows the Game. New York: Summit Books. ISBN 9780671631604.
