= Catharine F. Easterly =

American judge

Catharine Easterly
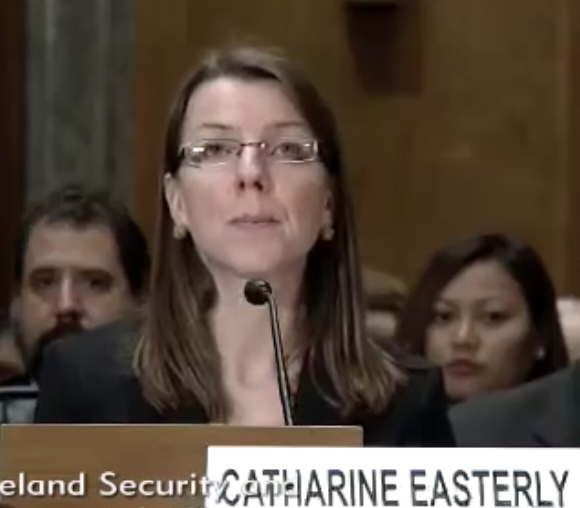
- Easterly in 2011

Associate Judge of the District of Columbia Court of Appeals
- Incumbent
- Assumed office February 10, 2012
- Appointed by: Barack Obama
- Preceded by: Noël A. Kramer

Personal details
- Born: Catharine Friend Easterly; December 18, 1970 (age 55) Boston, Massachusetts, U.S.
- Relatives: Harry Easterly (grandfather)
- Education: Yale University (BA); University of Virginia (JD)

Catharine Friend Easterly (born December 18, 1970) is an associate judge of the District of Columbia Court of Appeals, the highest appellate court for the District of Columbia.

== Biography ==
=== Early life ===
Easterly was born in Boston, Massachusetts to Harry and Patsy Easterly, and raised in Richmond, Virginia, where she graduated from St. Catherine's School. She majored in history at Yale College, graduating in 1992, and received her Juris Doctor degree from the University of Virginia School of Law in 1996.

== Career ==
During her law school summers Easterly worked at the Maryland Office of the Public Defender, the Legal Aid Society of the District of Columbia, and the Public Defender Service for the District of Columbia. After law school, Easterly worked as an appellate public defender in New York for four and a half years, first at the Legal Aid Society of Nassau County and then at the Office of the Appellate Defender in New York City.

From 2001 to 2003, Easterly practiced civil and criminal litigation at a law firm in New York and then as a solo practitioner in Washington, D.C. During this period her clients included the Metropolitan Opera. In April 2003, she returned to D.C.'s Public Defender Service, where she worked in the Special Litigation Division until she was appointed to the bench. In that role she litigated civil and criminal cases, wrote amicus briefs, and testified before the Council of the District of Columbia.

Easterly was nominated for the D.C. Court of Appeals by President Barack Obama on August 2, 2011, and confirmed by the Senate on November 18, 2011.

Legal offices
Preceded by Noël A. Kramer	Associate Judge of the District of Columbia Court of Appeals; 2011–present	Incumbent
