= America's Talking =

American cable television channel

- Country: United States
- Broadcast area: United States
- Headquarters: Fort Lee, New Jersey

Ownership
- Owner: General Electric
- Sister channels: CNBC

History
- Launched: July 4, 1994
- Closed: July 15, 1996 (2 years, 11 days)
- Replaced by: MSNBC

America's Talking was an American cable television channel focused mainly on talk-based programming, created by NBC, and spun off from economic channel CNBC. It was launched on July 4, 1994, and was carried in ten million American households upon launch. The headquarters were two floors below the original studios for CNBC in an office building on Fletcher Avenue in Fort Lee, New Jersey. The channel was shuttered on July 15, 1996, and its transponder space was replaced by MSNBC.

== Programming ==
The programming was mainly focused on low-budget talk shows and included the following lineup:

- America's Talking A.M. - A morning talk show, hosted by Steve Doocy and Kai Kim, with Tony Morelli as "the Prodigy Guy"
- Am I Nuts? - (later named State of Mind) hosted by psychologist Bernie Katz and behavioral therapist Cynthia Richmond
- What's New? - The latest hot gadgets, hosted by Mike Jerrick and later, Brian Tracey
- Break A Leg with Bill McCuddy - Mid-afternoon chatfest hosted by the winner of a CNBC-sponsored talent contest, Bill McCuddy, featured celebrities and musical acts
- Alive and Wellness - Healthy living by holistic methods, hosted by Carol Martin
- Ask E. Jean - A call-in advice show, hosted by writer E. Jean Carroll
- Have a Heart - A talk/news show discussing the brighter side of the news and show-arranged charitable situations, hosted by Lu Hanessian
- Pork - A political talk show focusing on government waste, hosted by John David Klein, the executive producers were Robin Gellman and Dennis Sullivan
- AT In-Depth - A two-hour news/talk show focusing on the day's top stories, co-hosted by Terry Anzur in Fort Lee and Chris Matthews in Washington, D.C.; Matthews later got his own show (see below) and the show became In Depth Coast to Coast with Anzur in Burbank, Califiornia, and John Gibson in Fort Lee
- Straight Forward - A celebrity hour-long talk show, hosted by the president of the network, Roger Ailes
- Bugged! - A comedic look at what bugs people, hosted by Brian O'Connor with Bill Gulino
- R&R with Roger Rose - A late-night themed talk show featuring the latest music and celebrities
- After Hours - This show replaced R&R and was basically the same format, now hosted by Brian Tracy and Bill Gulino. The show was eventually moved over to CNBC, where it was hosted by Mike Jerrick
- Politics with Chris Matthews - After moving over to CNBC during the rampdown of America's Talking, the show was renamed Hardball with Chris Matthews and eventually moved to MSNBC, where it aired nightly at 7 p.m. until March 2, 2020, when Mathews announced his retirement at the top of his final program; following a commercial break, Steve Kornacki took over for the rest of that episode
- Cable Crossings - A minute-long serial that aired between programs, written by Marv Himelfarb, featuring Brian Fraley and Kim Gregory, music written by Bill Gulino

== Closure ==
While America's Talking had something of a following, it was not successful in the ratings and was picked up by few cable providers. In January 1996, NBC announced plans to partner with Microsoft to launch MSNBC on cable and online with the satellite transponder that America's Talking occupied, effectively ending the life of the network.

After network president Roger Ailes left NBC to join Rupert Murdoch in launching the Fox News Channel for News Corporation, America's Talking officially signed off on July 15, 1996, and was replaced at 9 a.m. by MSNBC Live, hosted by Jodi Applegate.
