= Best Sex I've Ever Had =

Front page headline of the New York Post on February 16, 1990

Cover of the New York Post, February 16, 1990

"Best Sex I've Ever Had" is a headline that appeared on the front page of the New York Post on February 16, 1990. The headline is purportedly a quote from Marla Maples, who would become the second wife of then-businessman Donald Trump. The quote refers to Trump's supposed sexual prowess. Trump was married to Ivana Trump at the time of the headline; the couple's divorce was granted that year. The headline appeared during a media frenzy concerning the Trumps' marriage and his affair with Maples. Maples later denied the quote.

== Background ==
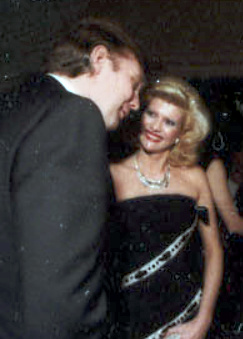
Donald and Ivana in 1985

At the time of the publication of the headline in 1990, the American businessman and property developer Donald Trump had been married to the Czech model Ivana Trump (née Zelníčková) since 1977. In December 1989, while on a family skiing holiday in Aspen, Colorado, Ivana and Marla Maples had encountered each other for the first time. Trump had secretly arranged for Maples, his mistress, to be present in Aspen at the time of his family's holiday. A February 11 article by Liz Smith in the New York Daily News had reported that Donald and Ivana Trump were no longer together.

In their 2017 biography of Trump, Trump Revealed, Michael Kranish and Marc Fisher detailed the media coverage of the breakdown of the couple's marriage, writing that in February 1990, despite the release of Nelson Mandela from prison and the bankruptcy of bankers Drexel Burnham Lambert, the Trumps' marriage "dominated the front pages of [New York City]'s tabloids" for "weeks".

Trump married Maples in 1993; the couple divorced in 1999.

== Front page story ==
The New York Post and the New York Daily News were rivals vying for stories on the couple's marriage at the time of the headline. Jill Brooke, the television and radio columnist for the New York Post at the time of the story, recalled in a 2018 article for The Hollywood Reporter that Trump had telephoned the editor of the New York Post, Jerry Nachman, in a rage as a result of an article in the Daily News by Liz Smith that he perceived as sympathetic to Ivana. In reference to his wife and Smith, Trump shouted "Those fucking bitches ... I want a front-page story tomorrow". The conversation was heard on speakerphone by Brooke. Nachman informed Trump that "Donald, you just don't demand a front-page story. There has to be a story" to which Trump replied that "For all the newspapers I've sold for you, you should give me one". After Trump asked Nachman how he could get a front-page story, Nachman told him that "murder, money or sex" would usually suffice as subject matters. Trump then told him "Marla says with me it's the best sex she's ever had". Nachman informed Trump that he needed corroboration for such a claim, at which point Trump shouted "Marla ... Didn't you say it's the best sex you ever had with me?". Brooke recalled that a "faint voice" could be heard replying "Yes, Donald" to Trump's question, and subsequent revelations that Trump adopted pseudonyms in conversations with journalists led Brooke to doubt whether the voice she heard in reply was actually Maples or Trump himself. Prior to the publication of Brooke's 2018 article, the New York Post reporter Bill Hoffmann had reported that the story had derived from his interview of two of Maples's friends from an acting class that she had been taking, and the friends had told Hoffmann that Maples had confided in them about her and Trump's love affair, and told them that Trump was "the best sex I've ever had".

Brooke felt the significance of the story stemmed from its novelty as prominent men "didn't discuss their sex lives on the record" at the time of the headline as it was a time "... before Facebook. This was before reality TV. This was when privacy mattered and oversharing was considered crass". The story was approved by Lou Colasuonno, the managing editor of the New York Post, who believed the story to be unlikely to be the target of a libel suit from Trump as "Donald will never complain about this one".

In February 1990 the Daily News ran Trump related stories for 12 successive days; with the New York Post running stories for eight days in succession. The Trump stories were described by Kranish and Fisher as having "reached their apex" when the "Best Sex I've Ever Had" headline was printed on the cover of the February 16 edition of the New York Post. The New York Post published 35 column inches on the Trumps' marital travails that day, with The New York Times publishing 49 inches, including detailed legal analysis of their marital split.

The front-page story that accompanied the headline was written by the New York Post reporter Bill Hoffmann. A photograph of Trump grinning was set alongside the article. The opening text of the article stated "We always knew Donald Trump was a tiger in the corporate board-room but now we know he's a wildcat in the bedroom too".

== Impact ==
Trump met the New York magazine writer John Taylor on the day of the publication of the story; Taylor recalled that Trump was relaxed and was impressed by the level of media coverage that the breakup of his marriage was receiving. Trump told Taylor that he had "never seen anything like it in my life. One day it was eight pages in the tabloids. Even The New York Times is doing it ... One of the papers had twelve reporters on it". Taylor felt that Trump had understood that there was "no such thing as bad publicity" and Trump was "able to spin [the story] like he was this irresistible macho guy that was being chased by these blonde beauties all over town". New York reported that Hoffmann had received interview requests from ABC, CBS, NBC, Fox and CNN following his scoop.

Maples subsequently appeared on the episode "Marriage Most Foul" of the sitcom Designing Women as herself in 1991. The characters of the show asked Maples about the veracity of the quote in the headline, and she told them that it was untrue and that she had never said it.

Hilary Weaver, writing for Vanity Fair in 2018, described the quote as Maples's "most famous quote by far, and maybe the peak of her prominence in pop culture". Kranish and Fisher described the headline as a "tabloid classic". Barbara Res, an executive at The Trump Organization, recalled that Trump proudly showed her a copy of the New York Post on the day of its publication, and that he was in "a great mood ... a big smile plastered on his face". Res and other executives at the company thought the headline was "terrible", she personally worried about the effect of the headline on Trump's children, recalling that Trump had a "six-year-old at home. He's got a twelve-year-old that can read the papers ... we thought that was terrible. He thought it was the greatest thing". Donald and Ivana Trump's daughter, Ivanka, recalled in her 2009 book, The Trump Card, that "one idiot reporter" asked her if "Marla Maples's claims were true". Ivanka was 9 years old at the time of the headline and felt her family's life was "fair game, on full display ... It was so insane, so offensive, so upsetting, and there was no let-up".

== Legacy ==
The headline gained renewed prominence in the wake of Trump's election to the presidency of the United States in 2016. In 2018, Maples denied that she had said the quote, telling reporters from the New York Post's Page Six gossip column that "I never said that, someone else said that ...[But] is it true? I'm not going to talk about that. The truth will come out, just not here". Maples winked at reporters after denying that she had given the quote.

In 2016, journalist Natasha Stoynoff accused Trump of forcibly kissing her in 2005 during a scheduled interview at Mar-a-Lago. After the alleged attack, Stoynoff said Trump referenced the New York Post cover and said, "You remember. Best sex I ever had."
