= Carol Dalton =

American judge (born 1950)

Associate Judge of the Superior Court of the District of Columbia
- In office August 2008 – February 2020
- President: George W. Bush
- Preceded by: Noël A. Kramer
- Succeeded by: Elana S. Suttenberg

Magistrate Judge of the Superior Court of the District of Columbia
- In office April 2002 – August 2008
- Preceded by: Seat established by Family Court Act of 2001

Personal details
- Born: September 2, 1950 (age 75) New York City, U.S.
- Education: City College of New York (BA); New York Law School (JD); George Washington University’s National Law Center (LLM)

Carol Ann Dalton (born September 2, 1950) is an American former magistrate judge and associate judge of the Superior Court of the District of Columbia.

== Education and career ==
Dalton attended Cardinal Spellman High School, graduating in June 1968. She earned her Bachelor of Arts in psychology from City College of New York in June 1972, Juris Doctor from New York Law School in June 1986 and her Master of Laws degree in tax law from George Washington University's National Law Center in June 1990.

After graduating, she worked in private practice.

=== D.C. Superior Court ===
In April 2002, Dalton was appointed as a magistrate judge on the Superior Court of the District of Columbia pursuant to the Family Court Act of 2001 which created the seat.

On November 9, 2005, President George W. Bush nominated her to be an associate judge on the same court. Her nomination expired on December 9, 2006, with the end of the 109th United States Congress.

President George W. Bush renominated her on January 9, 2007, to a 15-year term as an associate judge on the Superior Court of the District of Columbia to the seat vacated by Noël A. Kramer. On July 23, 2008, the Senate Committee on Homeland Security and Governmental Affairs held a hearing on her nomination. On July 30, 2008, the Committee reported her nomination favorably to the Senate floor. On August 1, 2008, the full Senate confirmed her nomination by voice vote.
