= E. Jean Carroll =

American journalist (born 1943)

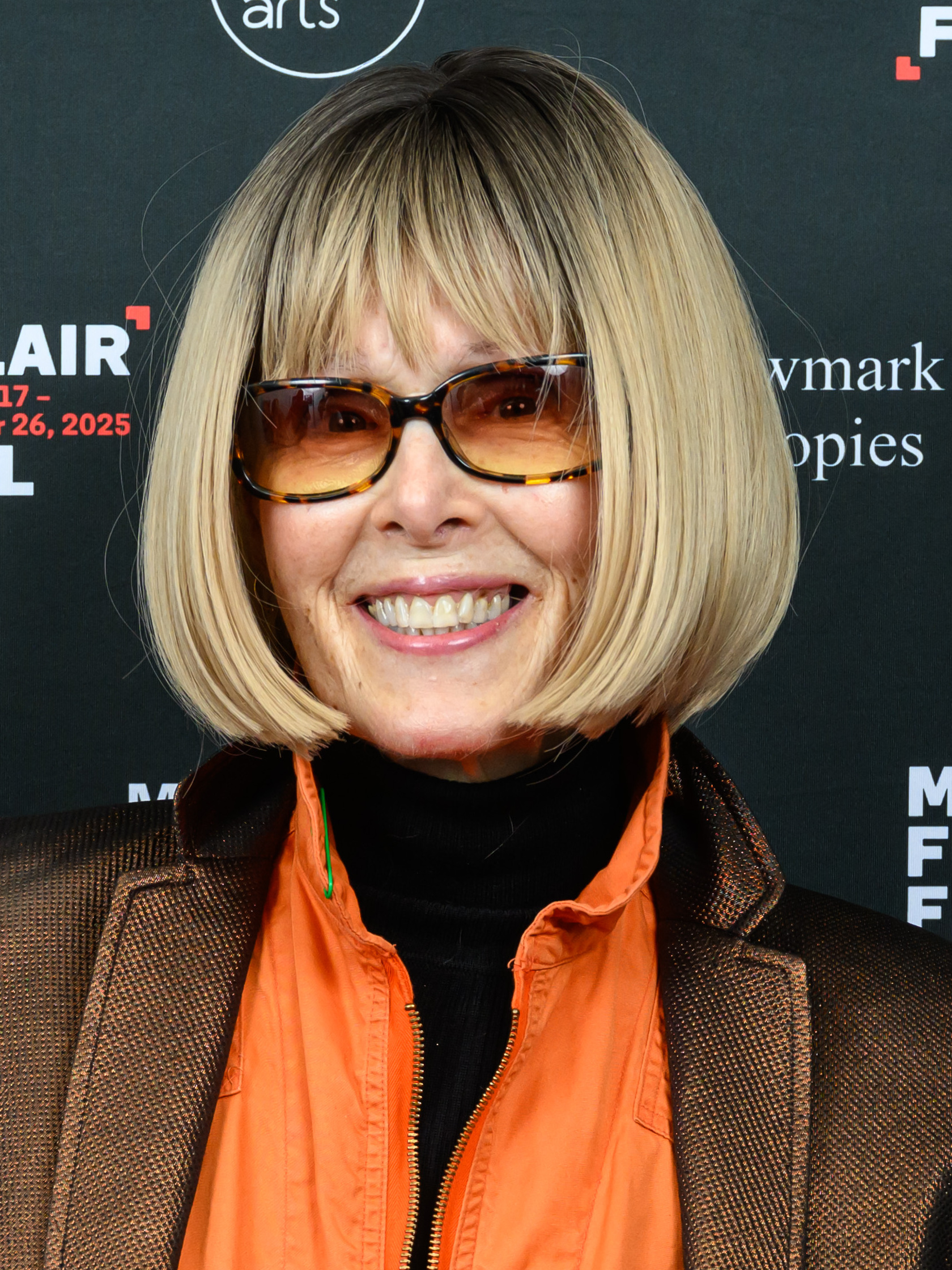
- Carroll at the 2025 Montclair Film Festival
- Born: Elizabeth Jean Carroll; December 12, 1943 (age 82); Detroit, Michigan, U.S.
- Education: Indiana University Bloomington (BA)
- Occupations: Journalist, advice columnist
- Employer(s): Elle, 1993–2020
- Spouses: Steve Byers (div. 1984) John Johnson (div. 1990)

Elizabeth Jean Carroll (born December 12, 1943) is an American journalist, author, and advice columnist. Her "Ask E. Jean" column appeared in Elle magazine from 1993 through 2019, becoming one of the longest-running advice columns in American publishing.

In her 2019 book, What Do We Need Men For?: A Modest Proposal, Carroll accused Donald Trump of sexually assaulting her in the mid-1990s. Her book Not My Type, subtitled One Woman Against a President, debuted at #2 on the New York Times best-seller list on June 28, 2025.

In 2019 and 2022 Carroll filed two related civil lawsuits against Trump which resulted in a total of $88.3 million in damages awarded to Carroll; he appealed both cases. The United States Supreme Court refused to hear an appeal by Trump to dismiss the first of these lawsuits in June 2026. In July 2026, he paid Carroll $5.6 million in damages.

== Early life ==
Elizabeth Jean Carroll was born on December 12, 1943, in Detroit, Michigan. Her father, Thomas F. Carroll Jr., was a furniture store manager, and her mother, Betty (née McKinney) Carroll, was a Republican politician in Allen County, Indiana. The oldest of four children, Carroll was raised in Fort Wayne, Indiana, with two sisters and a brother; as a child, she was called "Betty Jean", "Jeannie" and "Betty". She attended Indiana University Bloomington. A Pi Beta Phi and a cheerleader, she was crowned Miss Indiana University in 1963, and in 1964, as a representative of the university, she won the Miss Cheerleader USA title. She appeared on To Tell the Truth in 1964.

== Career ==
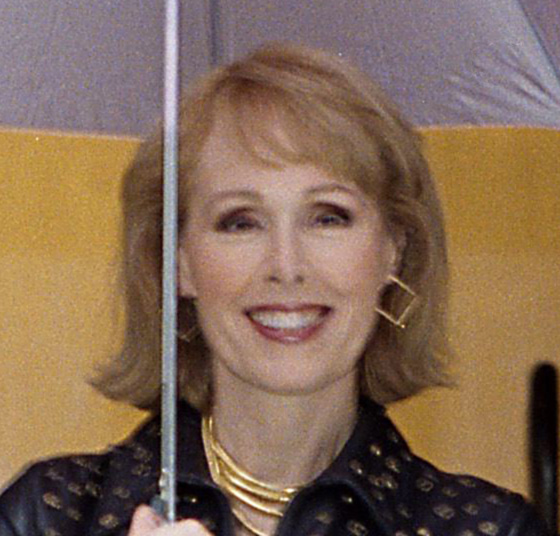
Carroll in 2006

=== Column: Ask E. Jean ===
Carroll's "Ask E. Jean" column appeared in Elle from 1993 until 2020. Widely read, it was acclaimed for Carroll's opinions on sex, her insistence that women should "never never" structure their lives around men, and her compassion for letter-writers experiencing difficult life situations. When it debuted, Amy Gross, a former editor-in-chief of Elle, compared the column to putting Carroll on a "bucking bronco", describing her responses to readers as "the cheers and whoops and hollers of a fearless woman having a good ol' time." Carroll's writing style often incorporates humor.

Carroll was fired from Elle in February 2020. She wrote on Twitter that she was dismissed "because Trump ridiculed my reputation, laughed at my looks, & dragged me through the mud". Elle maintained that the decision to fire Carroll was a business decision unrelated to Trump.

=== Television: Ask E. Jean, Saturday Night Live ===
Carroll wrote for Saturday Night Live's twelfth season in 1986 and 1987. She was nominated for a Primetime Emmy Award for Outstanding Writing for a Variety Series at the 39th Primetime Emmy Awards in 1987. The Television Academy entry for her nomination mistakenly lists her name as "Jean E. Carroll".

From 1994 through 1996, Carroll was the host and producer of the Ask E. Jean television series that aired on NBC's America's Talking—the predecessor to MSNBC. Entertainment Weekly called Carroll "the most entertaining cable talk show host you will never see." Carroll and the show were nominated for a CableACE Award in 1995.

=== Magazines, books, and anthologies ===
In addition to writing for magazines including The Atlantic and Vanity Fair, Carroll served as a contributing editor for Outside, Esquire, New York, and Playboy. She was Playboy's first female contributing editor.

Carroll was known for her gonzo-style first-person narratives. She hiked into the Star Mountains with an Atbalmin tracker and a Telefomin warrior, chronicled the lives of basketball groupies in a story called "Love in the Time of Magic"; and went to Indiana to investigate why four white farm kids were thrown out of school for dressing like black artists in "The Return of the White Negro". She moved in with her old boyfriends and their wives; and went on a camping trip with Fran Lebowitz. Bill Tonelli, her Esquire and Rolling Stone editor, said in a 1999 interview that all of Carroll's stories were "pretty much the same thing. Which is: 'What is this person like when he or she is in a room with E. Jean?' She's institutionally incapable of being uninteresting."

Carroll's work has been included in non-fiction anthologies such as The Best of Outside: The First 20 Years (Vintage Books, 1998), Out of the Noosphere: Adventure, Sports, Travel, and the Environment (Fireside, 1998) and Sand in My Bra: Funny Women Write from the Road (Traveler's Tales, 2003). Her 2002 story for Spin, "The Cheerleaders" was selected as one of the year's "Best True Crime Reporting" pieces. It appeared in Best American Crime Writing, edited by Otto Penzler, Thomas H. Cook, and Nicholas PileggI, published by Pantheon Books in 2002).

In 1993, Carroll's biography of Hunter S. Thompson, Hunter: The Strange and Savage Life of Hunter S. Thompson, was published by Dutton. Her memoir, What Do We Need Men For?: A Modest Proposal was released in June 2019. The title refers to the 1729 satire A Modest Proposal by Jonathan Swift. In 2019, The New York Times referred to Carroll as "feminism's answer to Hunter S. Thompson." Not My Type, her memoir about the five years that followed her first lawsuit against Trump, was published in June 2025. "A breezy read, packed with revenge, joy and barbed wit", it debuted at #2 on the New York Times best-seller list.

In 2020 and 2021, for The Atlantic, Carroll wrote a series of articles that profiled several of the 25 women that have accused Trump of sexual misconduct. Her profile of Jill Harth, who alleged that she had been groped by Trump, appeared in Vanity Fair in January 2021. In October 2021 This American Life featured Carroll in conversation with Jessica Leeds, who also accused Trump of sexual misconduct.

=== Online ===
In 2002, Carroll co-founded greatboyfriends.com with her sister, Cande Carroll. On the site, women recommended single men to each other. In 2005, GreatBoyfriends was acquired by The Knot Inc. In 2004, she launched Catch27.com, a spoof of Facebook. On the site, people put their profiles on trading cards and bought, sold, and traded each other. She launched an online version of her column, askejean.com, in 2007. In 2012 Carroll co-founded Tawkify, "a personal concierge for dating." She also advised Tawkify's matchmaking team.

== Sexual abuse and defamation lawsuit against Donald Trump ==
Carroll sued Trump for defamation and battery in the United States District Court for the Southern District of New York (originally filed in the New York Supreme Court). On May 9, 2023, a jury found Trump liable for defamation and sexual abuse against Carroll and awarded her $5 million in damages. On July 19, 2023, Judge Kaplan found that Trump did rape her as the term is understood "in common modern parlance", although not "in the narrow, technical meaning of a particular section of the New York Penal Law". On January 26, 2024, a jury found Trump liable for defamation against Carroll regarding his remarks after the first verdict, and awarded her an additional $83.3 million in damages. Trump appealed the verdict and posted a $91.6 million bond. In a per curiam ruling on September 8, 2025, an appeals court panel upheld the verdict and the award.

In an interview that aired on June 30, 2025, Carroll told Pamela Brown on CNN that she planned to give away the money: "The last thing I care about is money. The first thing I care about is people knowing the truth."

On September 8, 2025, the Second US Circuit Court of Appeals upheld the $83 million defamation award against President Trump, saying his conduct was "extraordinary and unprecedented". The appeal from President Trump's team had argued the punitive damages were too high but the appellate court cited other cases including $75 million awarded to two election workers who sued Rudy Giuliani for defamation in 2023 and the $321 million in punitive damages Alex Jones was ordered to pay for false claims about the Sandy Hook shooting.

On May 27, 2026, CNN reported that the Department of Justice launched a criminal investigation into Carroll, to investigate whether she committed perjury during her testimony with regards to receiving outside assistance in procuring the funds for said suit. Acting Attorney General Todd Blanche recused himself from the investigation.

On June 29, 2026, the United States Supreme Court issued its denial of President Trump's appeal to dismiss Carroll's first civil lawsuit. The denial let stand the $5 million judgement in Carroll's favor, causing the record to remain unchanged in the case of Trump's liability for sexual assault against Carroll. In addition to $600,000 in interest, in July 2026 he paid Carroll the $5 million in damages she was awarded at the conclusion of the 2019 lawsuit. A larger potential payment is still undecided in the disputes between Carroll and Trump.

== Sexual assault allegations against Les Moonves ==
Carroll was one of 13 women who in 2019 accused CBS Corporation chair and CEO Les Moonves of sexual assault. She says the incident occurred in the late 1990s in a hotel elevator after interviewing Moonves for a story; he denied the allegation.

== Personal life ==
Carroll lived in Montana with her first husband Steve Byers before moving to New York City to pursue a career as a journalist. They divorced in 1984. Her second marriage was to John Johnson, an anchorman and artist. Carroll and Johnson divorced in 1990. Carroll lived in upstate New York as of April 2023.

== Selected books ==
- 1985: Female Difficulties: Sorority Sisters, Rodeo Queens, Frigid Women, Smut Stars, and Other Modern Girls, Bantam Books, ISBN 978-0-553-05088-2
- 1993: Hunter: The Strange and Savage Life of Hunter S. Thompson, Dutton, ISBN 978-0-525-93568-1
- 1996: A Dog in Heat Is a Hot Dog and Other Rules to Live By, a collection of her Ask E. Jean columns, Simon and Schuster, ISBN 978-0-671-56814-6
- 2004: Mr. Right, Right Now!: How a Smart Woman Can Land Her Dream Man in 6 Weeks, HarperCollins, ISBN 978-0-06-053028-0
- 2019: What Do We Need Men For?: A Modest Proposal, St. Martin's Press, ISBN 978-1-250-21544-4
- 2025: Not My Type: One Woman vs. a President, St. Martin's Press, 368 pages. ISBN 1250381681
