= SAT =

Standardized test used for U.S. college admissions

- Type: Computer-based standardized test
- Administrator: College Board, Educational Testing Service
- Skills tested: Writing, critical reading, mathematics
- Purpose: Admission to undergraduate programs of universities or colleges
- Year started: 1926; 100 years ago
- Duration: 2 hours 14 minutes
- Score range: Test scored on scale of 200–800, (in 10-point increments), on each of two sections (total 400–1600). Essay scored on scale of 2–8, in 1-point increments, on each of three criteria.
- Offered: 8 times annually (Note: In 2020, the SAT was also offered on an additional September date due to the COVID-19 pandemic.)
- Regions: Worldwide
- Languages: English
- Annual number of test takers: ▼ Over 1.95 million high school graduates in the class of 2026
- Prerequisites: No official prerequisite. Intended for high school students. Fluency in English assumed.
- Fee: US$60 to US$111, depending on country.
- Used by: Most universities and colleges offering undergraduate programs in the United States
- Website: sat.collegeboard.org

SAT (/ˌɛs.ˌeɪ.ˈtiː/) is a standardized test widely used for college admissions in the United States. Since its debut in 1926, its name and scoring have changed several times. For much of its history, it was called the Scholastic Aptitude Test and had two components, Verbal and Mathematical, each of which was scored on a range from 200 to 800. Later it was called the Scholastic Assessment Test, then the SAT I: Reasoning Test, then the SAT Reasoning Test, then simply the SAT.

The SAT is wholly owned, developed, and published by the College Board. The test is intended to assess students' readiness for college. Historically, starting around 1937, the tests offered under the SAT banner also included optional subject-specific SAT Subject Tests, which were called SAT Achievement Tests until 1993 and then were called SAT II: Subject Tests until 2005; these were discontinued after June 2021. Originally designed not to be aligned with high school curricula, several adjustments were made for the version of the SAT introduced in 2016. College Board president David Coleman added that he wanted to make the test reflect more closely what students learn in high school with the new Common Core standards.

Many students prepare for the SAT using books, classes, online courses, and tutoring, which are offered by a variety of companies and organizations. However, preparatory courses rarely provide significant improvements in performance, and neither do elite secondary schools. For most of its history, the SAT was taken on paper; however, since March 2023 for international students and March 2024 for those within the U.S., the SAT has been administered using a computer program called Bluebook. The test was also made adaptive, customizing the questions that are presented to the student based on how they perform on questions asked earlier in the test, and shortened from 3 hours to 2 hours and 14 minutes.

While a considerable amount of research has been done on the SAT, many questions and misconceptions remain. Outside of college admissions, the SAT is also used by researchers studying human intelligence in general and intellectual precociousness in particular, and by some employers in the recruitment process.

== Function ==
The SAT is typically taken by high school juniors and seniors. The College Board states that the SAT is intended to measure literacy, numeracy and writing skills that are needed for academic success in college. They state that the SAT assesses how well the test-takers analyze and solve problems—skills they learned in school that they will need in college.

The College Board also claims that the SAT, in combination with high school grade point average (GPA), provides a better indicator of success in college than high school grades alone, as measured by first-year college GPA. Various studies conducted over the lifetime of the SAT show a statistically significant increase in correlation of high school grades and first-year college grades when the SAT is factored in. The predictive validity and powers of the SAT are topics of research in psychometrics.

The SAT is a norm-referenced test intended to yield scores that follow a bell curve distribution among test-takers. To achieve this distribution, test designers include challenging multiple-choice questions with plausible but incorrect options, known as "distractors", exclude questions that a majority of students answer correctly, and impose tight time constraints during the examination.

There are substantial differences in funding, curricula, grading, and difficulty among U.S. secondary schools due to U.S. federalism, local control, and the prevalence of private, distance, and home schooled students. SAT (and ACT) scores are intended to supplement the secondary school record and help admission officers put local data—such as course work, grades, and class rank—in a national perspective.

The number of seniors in high school taking the SAT and ACT tests by year of graduation

U.S. states in blue had more seniors in the class of 2025 who took the SAT than the ACT while those in red had more seniors taking the ACT than the SAT.

Historically, the SAT was more widely used by students living in coastal states and the ACT was more widely used by students in the Midwest and South; in recent years, however, an increasing number of students on the East and West coasts have been taking the ACT. Since 2007, all four-year colleges and universities in the United States that require a test as part of an application for admission will accept either the SAT or ACT, and as of Fall 2022, more than 1400 four-year colleges and universities did not require any standardized test scores at all for admission, though some of them were planning to apply this policy only temporarily due to the coronavirus pandemic.

SAT test-takers are given 2 hours and 14 minutes to complete the test (plus a 10-minute break between the Reading and Writing section and the Math section), and as of 2024 the test costs US$60, plus additional fees for late test registration, registration by phone, registration changes, rapid delivery of results, delivery of results to more than four institutions, result deliveries ordered more than nine days after the test, and testing administered outside the United States, as applicable, and fee waivers are offered to low-income students within the U.S. and its territories. Scores on the SAT range from 400 to 1600, combining test results from two 200-to-800-point sections: the Mathematics section and the Evidence-Based Reading and Writing section. Although taking the SAT, or its competitor the ACT, is required for entry to many colleges and universities in the United States, during the late 2010s, many institutions made these entrance exams optional, but this did not stop the students from attempting to achieve high scores as they and their parents were skeptical of what "optional" meant in this context. In fact, the test-taking population was increasing steadily, and while this may have resulted in a long-term decline in scores, experts cautioned against using this to gauge the scholastic levels of the entire U.S. population.

Weekend test scores are typically released around two weeks after the test, while those from school days can take up to four. Students may be able to cancel their scores up to one week after their exam.

== Structure ==
The digitally-administered SAT has two main sections: reading and writing, and math. Each of these sections is further broken down into two equal-length "modules". (Until the summer of 2021, the test taker was also optionally able to write an essay as part of an additional test section. The essay was dropped after June 2021, except in a few states and school districts.) The total time for the scored portion of the SAT is 2 hours and 14 minutes.

A score for each section is reported on a scale of 200 to 800, and each section score is a multiple of ten. A total score for the SAT is calculated by adding the two section scores, resulting in total scores that range from 400 to 1600. In addition to the two section scores, several subsection "performance" scores (example subsections: "Craft and Structure" in Reading and Writing, and "Algebra" in Math) are also reported for each section. There is no penalty or negative marking for guessing on the SAT: scores are based on the number of questions answered correctly.

The essay, if taken as part of an SAT School Day administration, is scored separately from the two section scores. Two people score each essay by each awarding 1 to 4 points in each of three categories: reading, analysis, and writing. These two scores from the different examiners are then combined to give a total score from 2 to 8 points per category. Though sometimes people quote their essay score out of 24, the College Board themselves do not combine the different categories to give one essay score, instead giving a score for each category.

The optional essay was last featured nationally in the June 2021 administration. College Board said it discontinued the essay section because "there are other ways for students to demonstrate their mastery of essay writing," including the test's reading and writing portion. It also acknowledged that the COVID-19 pandemic had played a role in the change, accelerating 'a process already underway'.

=== Reading and Writing ===
The reading and writing section consists of two equal modules, each 32 minutes long with 27 questions. The modules consist of short reading passages or passage pairs, each of which is followed by a single multiple-choice question. The passages are 25 to 150 words in length. Content domains of the reading and writing section include vocabulary, sentence structure and usage, and interpretation of tables and graphs.

=== Mathematics ===
An example from the pre-digital pencil-and-paper SAT exam of a student-produced response math question and the correctly filled in answer

The mathematics portion of the SAT is divided into two modules, each 35 minutes long with 22 questions. The topics covered are algebra (13 to 15 questions), advanced high school math (13 to 15 questions), problem solving and data analysis (5 to 7 questions), and geometry and trigonometry (5 to 7 questions). Roughly 75% of the math questions are 4-option multiple-choice; the remaining 25% are student-produced response (SPR) questions and require the student to type in a numerical response. The SPR questions may have more than one correct answer. Calculators are permitted on all questions in the math portion of the SAT. A Desmos-based calculator is available and built into the testing software; in addition, students may use an approved type of physical calculator.

A study of calculator use on SAT I: Reasoning Test math scores found that performance on the math section was associated with the extent of calculator use: those using calculators on about one third to one half of the items averaged higher scores than those using calculators more or less frequently. However, the effect was "more likely to have been the result of able students using calculators differently than less able students rather than calculator use per se." There is some evidence that the frequent use of a calculator in school outside of the testing situation has a positive effect on test performance compared to those who do not use calculators in school.

=== Style of questions ===
Most of the questions on the SAT, except for the student-produced responses (SPR) in the math section, are multiple choice; all multiple-choice questions have four answer choices, one of which is correct. About 25% of the math section is SPR. They instead require the test taker to enter in a number.

Not all questions on each section of the SAT are weighted equally; students earn more scores for answering more difficult questions correctly. There are experimental problems which are used by College Board to test future test questions. Answering experimental questions, either correctly or incorrectly, does not impact the test score. Experimental questions are used for evaluating new types of questions for future SATs.

Section	Average score 2026 (200–800)	Time (minutes)	Content
Reading and Writing	528	32 per module 64 in total	Vocabulary, critical reading, sentence-level reading, grammar, usage, and diction
Math	517	35 per module 70 in total	Number and operations; algebra and functions; geometry; statistics, probability, and data analysis

== Logistics ==
=== Frequency ===
The SAT is offered eight times a year worldwide: in August, September, October, November, December, March, May, and June. Originally, for international students, the SAT was offered four times a year: in October, December, March and May (2020 exception: to cover worldwide May cancelation, an additional September exam was introduced, and August was made available to international test-takers as well). The test is typically offered on the first Saturday of the month for the October, November, December, May, and June administrations. The test was taken by 1,954,833 high school graduates in the class of 2026.

Candidates wishing to take the test may register online at the College Board's website or by mail at least three weeks before the test date.

There are also SAT School Day tests for students taking the SAT during school. They are offered from March to April and October.

=== Fees ===
As of 2024, the SAT costs US$68, plus additional fees if testing outside the United States. The College Board makes fee waivers available for low-income students. Additional fees apply for late registration, standby testing, registration changes, scores by telephone, and extra score reports (beyond the four provided for free).

=== Accommodation for candidates with disabilities ===
Students with verifiable disabilities, including physical and learning disabilities, are eligible to take the SAT with accommodations. The standard time increase for students requiring additional time due to learning disabilities or physical handicaps is time + 50%; time + 100% is also offered.

== Change from paper-based to digital ==
In January 2022, College Board announced that the SAT would change from paper-based to digital (computer-based). International (non-U.S.) testing centers began using the digital format on March 11, 2023. The December 2023 SAT was the last SAT test offered on paper. The switch to the digital format occurred on March 9, 2024, in the U.S. The digital SAT takes about an hour less to do than the paper-based test (two hours vs. three). It is administered in an official test center, as before, but the students use their own testing devices (a portable computer or tablet). However, a school may require the use of school-issued devices for students taking the digital SAT on its campus. If a student cannot bring his or her own device, one can be requested from College Board. Before the test, College Board's "Bluebook" app must have been successfully installed on the testing device.

Students have two modules per section (reading/writing and math). On the reading and writing modules, the questions will have shorter passages for each question. On the math modules, the word problems will be more concise. Students have a ten-minute break after the first two English modules and before the two math modules. A timer is built into the testing software and will automatically begin once the student finishes the second English module. New tools such as a question flagger, a timer, and an integrated Desmos-powered graphing calculator are included in the digital SAT.

The new test is adaptive, with the second module being adaptive to the demonstrated level based on the results from the first module. Specifically, the difficulty of Module 2 in each section is determined by a student's performance in Module 1. Strong performance in the first module leads to placement in a more challenging Module 2, which contains the most difficult questions on the test. Weaker performance results in assignment to an easier Module 2. The harder reading module often includes short passages that can be highly academic and rhetorically complex, while the harder math module focuses on more abstract and advanced concepts and problems.

== Scaled scores and percentiles ==
Students receive their online score reports approximately two to four weeks after test administration (longer for mailed, paper scores). Included in the report is the total score (the sum of the two section scores, with each section graded on a scale of 200–800) and three subscores (in reading, writing, and analysis, each on a scale of 2–8) for the optional essay. Students may also receive, for an additional fee, a score verification service; the question and answer service, which provided the test questions, the student's answers, the correct answers, and the type and difficulty of each question, is not available for the digital SAT.

In addition, students receive two percentile scores, each of which is defined by the College Board as the percentage of students in a comparison group with equal or lower test scores. One of the percentiles, called the "Nationally Representative Sample Percentile", uses as a comparison group all 11th and 12th graders in the United States, regardless of whether or not they took the SAT. This percentile is theoretical and is derived using methods of statistical inference. The second percentile, called the "SAT User Percentile", uses actual scores from a comparison group of recent United States students that took the SAT. For example, for the school year 2019–2020, the SAT User Percentile was based on the test scores of students in the graduating classes of 2018 and 2019 who took the SAT (specifically, the 2016 revision) during high school. Students receive both types of percentiles for their total score as well as their section scores.

=== Percentiles for total scores (2019) ===
Percentiles for total scores (2019)
Score, 400–1600 scale	SAT User	Nationally representative sample
1600	99+	99+
1550	99	99+
1500	98	99
1450	96	99
1400	93	97
1350	90	94
1300	86	91
1250	81	86
1200	75	81
1150	68	74
1100	60	67
1050	51	58
1000	43	48
950	35	38
900	27	29
850	19	21
800	13	14
750	7	8
700	3	4
650	1	1
640–400	1-	1-

=== Percentiles for total scores (2006) ===
The following chart summarizes the original percentiles used for the version of the SAT administered in March 2005 through January 2016. These percentiles used students in the graduating class of 2006 as the comparison group.

Percentile	Score 400–1600 scale, (official, 2006)	Score, 600–2400 scale (official, 2006)
99.93/99.98*	1600	2400
99.5	≥1540	≥2280
99	≥1480	≥2200
98	≥1450	≥2140
97	≥1420	≥2100
93	≥1340	≥1990
88	≥1280	≥1900
81	≥1220	≥1800
72	≥1150	≥1700
61	≥1090	≥1600
48	≥1010	≥1500
36	≥950	≥1400
24	≥870	≥1300
15	≥810	≥1200
8	≥730	≥1090
4	≥650	≥990
2	≥590	≥890
* The percentile of the perfect score was 99.98 on the 2400 scale and 99.93 on the 1600 scale.

=== Percentiles for total scores (1984) ===
Percentiles for total scores (1984)
Score (1984)	Percentile
1600	99.9995
1550	99.983
1500	99.89
1450	99.64
1400	99.10
1350	98.14
1300	96.55
1250	94.28
1200	91.05
1150	86.93
1100	81.62
1050	75.31
1000	67.81
950	59.64
900	50.88
850	41.98
800	33.34
750	25.35
700	18.26
650	12.37
600	7.58
550	3.97
500	1.53
450	0.29
400	0.002

=== Percentiles for verbal and math scores (1969–70) ===
Score, 200–800 scale	Verbal SAT User	Verbal, nationally representative sample	Math SAT User, Boys	Math SAT User, Girls
800	99+	99+	99+	99+
750	99+	99+	99	99+
700	98	99+	95	99
650	95	98	89	96
600	89	95	78	89
550	79	90	65	79
500	66	82	48	63
450	50	72	33	46
400	33	58	20	29
350	18	44	11	16
300	7	28	4	6
250	2	14	1	1
200	1−	4	1−	1−

The mean verbal score was 461 for students taking the SAT, 383 for the sample of all students.

The mathematical scores for 1969–70 were broken out by gender rather than reported as a whole; the mean math score for boys was 415, for girls 378. The differences for the nationally sampled population for math (not shown in table) were similar to those for the verbal section.

=== Ceilings and trends ===
The version of the SAT administered before April 1995 had a very high ceiling. For example, in the 1985–1986 school year, only 9 students out of 1.7 million test takers obtained a score of 1600.

In 2015 the average score for the class of 2015 was 1490 out of a maximum 2400. That was down 7 points from the previous class's mark and was the lowest composite score of the past decade.

== SAT–ACT score comparisons ==
The College Board and ACT, Inc., conducted a joint study of students who took both the SAT and the ACT between September 2004 (for the ACT) or March 2005 (for the SAT) and June 2006. Tables were provided to concord scores for students taking the SAT after January 2005 and before March 2016. In May 2016, the College Board released concordance tables to concord scores on the SAT used from March 2005 through January 2016 to the SAT used since March 2016, as well as tables to concord scores on the SAT used since March 2016 to the ACT.

In 2018, the College Board, in partnership with the ACT, introduced a new concordance table to better compare how a student would fare one test to another. This is now considered the official concordance to be used by college professionals and is replacing the one from 2016. The new concordance no longer features the old SAT (out of 2,400), just the new SAT (out of 1,600) and the ACT (out of 36).

As of 2018, the most appropriate corresponding SAT score point for the given ACT score is also shown in the table below.

ACT Composite Score	SAT Total Score Range	SAT Total Score
36	1570–1600	1590
35	1530–1560	1540
34	1490–1520	1500
33	1450–1480	1460
32	1420–1440	1430
31	1390–1410	1400
30	1360–1380	1370
29	1330–1350	1340
28	1300–1320	1310
27	1260–1290	1280
26	1230–1250	1240
25	1200–1220	1210
24	1160–1190	1180
23	1130–1150	1140
22	1100–1120	1110
21	1060–1090	1080
20	1030–1050	1040
19	990–1020	1010
18	960–980	970
17	920–950	930
16	880–910	890
15	830–870	850
14	780–820	800
13	730–770	760
12	690–720	710
11	650–680	670
10	620–640	630
9	590–610	590

== Elucidation ==
=== Preparation ===
Pioneered by Stanley Kaplan in 1946 with a 64-hour course, SAT preparation has become a highly lucrative field. Many companies and organizations offer test preparation in the form of books, classes, online courses, and tutoring. The test preparation industry began almost simultaneously with the introduction of university entrance exams in the U.S. and flourished from the start. Test-preparation scams are a genuine problem for parents and students. In general, East Asian Americans, especially Korean Americans, are the most likely to take private SAT preparation courses while African Americans typically rely more one-on-one tutoring for remedial learning.

Nevertheless, the College Board maintains that the SAT is essentially uncoachable and research by the College Board and the National Association of College Admission Counseling suggests that tutoring courses result in an average increase of about 20 points on the math section and 10 points on the verbal section. Indeed, researchers have shown time and again that preparation courses tend to offer at best a modest boost to test scores. Like IQ scores, SAT scores tend to be stable over time, meaning SAT preparation courses offer only a limited advantage. An early meta-analysis (from 1983) found similar results and noted "the size of the coaching effect estimated from the matched or randomized studies (10 points) seems too small to be practically important." Statisticians Ben Domingue and Derek C. Briggs examined data from the Education Longitudinal Survey of 2002 and found that the effects of coaching were only statistically significant for mathematics; moreover, coaching had a greater effect on certain students than others, especially those who have taken rigorous courses and those of high socioeconomic status. A 2012 systematic literature review estimated a coaching effect of 23 and 32 points for the math and verbal tests, respectively. A 2016 meta-analysis estimated the effect size to be 0.09 and 0.16 for the verbal and math sections respectively, although there was a large degree of heterogeneity. Meanwhile, a 2011 study found that the effects of one-on-one tutoring to be minimal among all ethnic groups. Public misunderstanding of how to prepare for the SAT continues to be exploited by the preparation industry.

While there is a link between family background and taking an SAT preparation course, not all students benefit equally from such an investment. In fact, any average gains in SAT scores due to such courses are primarily due to improvements among East Asian Americans. When this group is broken down even further, Korean Americans are more likely to take SAT prep courses than Chinese Americans, taking full advantage of their Church communities and ethnic economy.

The College Board announced a partnership with the non-profit organization Khan Academy to offer free test-preparation materials starting in the 2015–16 academic year to help level the playing field for students from low-income families. Students may also bypass costly preparation programs using the more affordable official guide from the College Board and with solid studying habits.

The College Board also offers a test called the Preliminary SAT/National Merit Scholarship Qualifying Test (PSAT/NMSQT), and there is some evidence that taking the PSAT at least once can help students do better on the SAT; moreover, like the case for the SAT, top scorers on the PSAT could earn scholarships. According to cognitive scientist Sian Beilock, 'choking', or substandard performance on important occasions, such as taking the SAT, can be prevented by doing plenty of practice questions and proctored exams to improve procedural memory, making use of the booklet to write down intermediate steps to avoid overloading working memory, and writing a diary entry about one's anxieties on the day of the exam to enhance self-empathy and positive self-image. Sleep hygiene is important as the quality of sleep during the days leading to the exam can improve performance. Moreover, it has been shown that later class times (8:30 am rather than 7:30 am), which better suits the shifted circadian rhythm of teenagers, can raise SAT scores enough to change the tier of the colleges and universities student might be admitted to.

In the wake of the COVID-19 pandemic, a large number of American colleges and universities decided to make standardized test scores optional for prospective students. Nevertheless, many students still chose to take the SAT and to enroll in preparation programs, which continued to be profitable.

=== Predictive validity and powers ===
In 2009, education researchers Richard C. Atkinson and Saul Geiser from the University of California (UC) system argued that high school GPA is better than the SAT at predicting college grades regardless of high school type or quality. In its 2020 report, the UC academic senate found that the SAT was better than high school GPA at predicting first year GPA, and just as good as high school GPA at predicting undergraduate GPA, first year retention, and graduation. This predictive validity was found to hold across demographic groups, with the report noting that standardized test scores were actually "better predictors of success for students who are underrepresented minority students (URMs), who are first-generation, or whose families are low-income." A series of College Board reports point to similar predictive validity across demographic groups.

However, a month after the UC academic senate report, Saul Geiser rejected the UC academic senate's findings "spurious" because it omitted student demographics. Indicating when high school GPA is combined with demographics in the prediction, the SAT is less reliable. Li Cai, a UCLA professor who directs the National Center for Research on Evaluation, Standards, and Student Testing, indicated that the UC Academic Senate did include student demographics by using a different and simpler model for the public to understand and that the discriminatory impacts of the SAT are compensated during the admissions process. Jesse Rothstein, a UC Berkeley professor of public policy and economics, countered Li's claim, claiming that the UC academic senate misunderstood overestimated the value the SAT. According to Rothstein, UC admissions policies did not "compensate" for group differences in test scores.

However, by analyzing their own institutional data, Brown, Yale, and Dartmouth universities reached the conclusion that SAT scores were more reliable predictors of collegiate success than GPA. Furthermore, the scores allowed them to identify more potentially qualified students from disadvantaged backgrounds than they otherwise would. At the University of Texas at Austin, students who declined to submit SAT scores when such scores were optional performed more poorly than their peers who did. These results were replicated by a study conducted by the non-profit organization Opportunity Insights analyzing data from Ivy League institutions (Brown University, Columbia University, Cornell University, Dartmouth College, Harvard University, Princeton University, the University of Pennsylvania, and Yale University) plus Stanford University, the Massachusetts Institute of Technology, and the University of Chicago.

A 2009 study found that SAT or ACT scores along with high-school GPAs are strong predictors of cumulative university GPAs. In particular, those with standardized test scores in the 50th percentile or better had a two-thirds chance of having a cumulative university GPA in the top half. A 2010 meta-analysis by researchers from the University of Minnesota offered evidence that standardized admissions tests such as the SAT predicted not only first-year GPA but also overall collegiate GPA. A 2012 study from the same university using a multi-institutional data set revealed that even after controlling for socioeconomic status and high-school GPA, SAT scores were still as capable of predicting first-year GPAs among university or college students. A 2019 study with a sample size of around a quarter of a million students suggested that together, SAT scores and high-school GPA offered an excellent predictor of first-year collegiate GPA and second-year retention. In 2018, psychologists Oren R. Shewach, Kyle D. McNeal, Nathan R. Kuncel, and Paul R. Sackett showed that both high-school GPA and SAT scores predict enrollment in advanced collegiate courses, even after controlling for Advanced Placement credits.

Education economist Jesse Rothstein indicated in 2005 that high-school average SAT scores were better at predicting first-year university GPAs compared to individual SAT scores. In other words, a student's SAT scores were not as informative with regards to future academic success as his or her high school's average. In contrast, individual high-school GPAs were a better predictor of collegiate success than average high-school GPAs. Furthermore, an admissions officer who failed to take average SAT scores into account would risk overestimating the future performance of a student from a low-scoring school and underestimating that of a student from a high-scoring school.

While the SAT is correlated with intelligence and as such estimates individual differences, it does not have anything to say about "effective cognitive performance" or what intelligent people do. Nor does it measure non-cognitive traits associated with academic success such as positive attitudes or conscientiousness. Psychometricians Thomas R. Coyle and David R. Pillow showed in 2008 that the SAT predicts college GPA even after removing the general factor of intelligence (g), with which it is highly correlated.

Like other standardized tests such as the ACT or the GRE, the SAT is a traditional method for assessing the academic aptitude of students who have had vastly different educational experiences and as such is focused on the common materials that the students could reasonably be expected to have encountered throughout the course of study. As such the mathematics section contains no materials above the precalculus level, for instance. Psychologist Raymond Cattell referred to this as testing for "historical" rather than "current" crystallized intelligence. Psychologist Scott Barry Kaufman further noted that the SAT can only measure a snapshot of a person's performance at a particular moment in time. Educational psychologists Jonathan Wai, David Lubinski, and Camilla Benbow observed that one way to increase the predictive validity of the SAT is by assessing the student's spatial reasoning ability, as the SAT at present does not contain any questions to that effect. Spatial reasoning skills are important for success in STEM. A 2006 study led by psychometrician Robert Sternberg found that the ability of SAT scores and high-school GPAs to predict collegiate performance could further be enhanced by additional assessments of analytical, creative, and practical thinking.

Psychologist Nancy Etcoff observed that since better looking students were more likely to receive higher marks, standardized tests such as the SAT could help ensure fairness. Experimental psychologist Meredith Frey noted that while advances in education research and neuroscience can help incrementally improve the ability to predict scholastic achievement in the future, the SAT or other standardized tests likely will remain a valuable tool to build upon. In a 2014 op-ed for The New York Times, psychologist John D. Mayer called the predictive powers of the SAT "an astonishing achievement" and cautioned against making it and other standardized tests optional. Research by psychometricians David Lubinsky, Camilla Benbow, and their colleagues has shown that the SAT could even predict life outcomes beyond university.

=== Difficulty and relative weight ===
The SAT rigorously assesses students' mental stamina, memory, speed, accuracy, and capacity for abstract and analytical reasoning. For American universities and colleges, standardized test scores are the most important factor in admissions, second only to high-school GPAs. By international standards, however, the SAT is not that difficult. For example, South Korea's College Scholastic Ability Test (CSAT) and Finland's Matriculation Examination are both longer, tougher, and count for more towards the admissibility of a student to university. In many countries around the world, exams, including university entrance exams, are the sole deciding factor of admission; school grades are simply irrelevant. In China and India, doing well on the Gaokao or the IIT-JEE, respectively, enhances the social status of the students and their families.

In an article from 2012, educational psychologist Jonathan Wai argued that the SAT was too easy to be useful to the most competitive of colleges and universities, whose applicants typically had brilliant high-school GPAs and standardized test scores. Admissions officers therefore had the burden of differentiating the top scorers from one another, not knowing whether or not the students' perfect or near-perfect scores truly reflected their scholastic aptitudes. He suggested that the College Board make the SAT more difficult, which would raise the measurement ceiling of the test, allowing the top schools to identify the best and brightest among the applicants. At that time, the College Board was already working on making the SAT tougher. The changes were announced in 2014 and implemented in 2016.

After realizing the June 2018 test was easier than usual, the College Board made adjustments resulting in lower-than-expected scores, prompting complaints from the students, though some agreed this was to ensure fairness. In its analysis of the incident, the Princeton Review supported the idea of curving grades, but pointed out that the test was incapable of distinguishing students in the 86th percentile (650 points) or higher in mathematics. The Princeton Review also noted that this particular curve was unusual in that it offered no cushion against careless or last-minute mistakes for high-achieving students. The Review posted a similar blog post for the SAT of August 2019, when a similar incident happened and the College Board responded in the same manner, noting, "A student who misses two questions on an easier test should not get as good a score as a student who misses two questions on a hard test. Equating takes care of that issue." It also cautioned students against retaking the SAT immediately, for they might be disappointed again, and recommended that instead, they give themselves some "leeway" before trying again.

=== Recognition ===
The College Board claims that outside of the United States, the SAT is considered for university admissions in approximately 70 countries, as of the 2023–24 academic year.

=== Association with general cognitive ability ===
In a 2000 study, psychometrician Ann M. Gallagher and her colleagues found that only the top students made use of intuitive reasoning in solving problems encountered on the mathematics section of the SAT. Cognitive psychologists Brenda Hannon and Mary McNaughton-Cassill discovered that having a good working memory, the ability of knowledge integration, and low levels of test anxiety predicts high performance on the SAT.

Frey and Detterman (2004) investigated associations of SAT scores with intelligence test scores. Using an estimate of general mental ability, or g, based on the Armed Services Vocational Aptitude Battery, they found SAT scores to be highly correlated with g (r=.82 in their sample, .857 when adjusted for non-linearity) in their sample taken from a 1979 national probability survey. Additionally, they investigated the correlation between SAT results, using the revised and recentered form of the test, and scores on the Raven's Advanced Progressive Matrices, a test of fluid intelligence (reasoning), this time using a non-random sample. They found that the correlation of SAT results with scores on the Raven's Advanced Progressive Matrices was .483, they estimated that this correlation would have been about 0.72 were it not for the restriction of ability range in the sample. They also noted that there appeared to be a ceiling effect on the Raven's scores which may have suppressed the correlation. Beaujean and colleagues (2006) have reached similar conclusions to those reached by Frey and Detterman. Because the SAT is strongly correlated with general intelligence, it can be used as a proxy to measure intelligence, especially when the time-consuming traditional methods of assessment are unavailable.

Psychometrician Linda Gottfredson noted that the SAT is effective at identifying intellectually gifted college-bound students.

For decades many critics have accused designers of the verbal SAT of cultural bias as an explanation for the disparity in scores between poorer and wealthier test-takers, with the biggest critics coming from the University of California system. A famous example of this perceived bias in the SAT I was the oarsman–regatta analogy question, which is no longer part of the exam. The object of the question was to find the pair of terms that had the relationship most similar to the relationship between "runner" and "marathon". The correct answer was "oarsman" and "regatta". The choice of the correct answer was thought to have presupposed students' familiarity with rowing, a sport popular with the wealthy. However, for psychometricians, analogy questions are a useful tool to gauge the mental abilities of students, for, even if the meaning of two words are unclear, a student with sufficiently strong analytical thinking skills should still be able to identify their relationships. Analogy questions were removed in 2005. In their place are questions that provide more contextual information should the students be ignorant of the relevant definition of a word, making it easier for them to guess the correct answer.

=== Association with college or university majors and rankings ===
In 2015, educational psychologist Jonathan Wai of Duke University analyzed average test scores from the Army General Classification Test in 1946 (10,000 students), the Selective Service College Qualification Test in 1952 (38,420), Project Talent in the early 1970s (400,000), the Graduate Record Examination between 2002 and 2005 (over 1.2 million), and the SAT Math and Verbal in 2014 (1.6 million). Wai identified one consistent pattern: those with the highest test scores tended to pick the physical sciences and engineering as their majors while those with the lowest were more likely to choose education and agriculture. (See figure below.) Bob Uttl and his collaborators reached a similar conclusion.

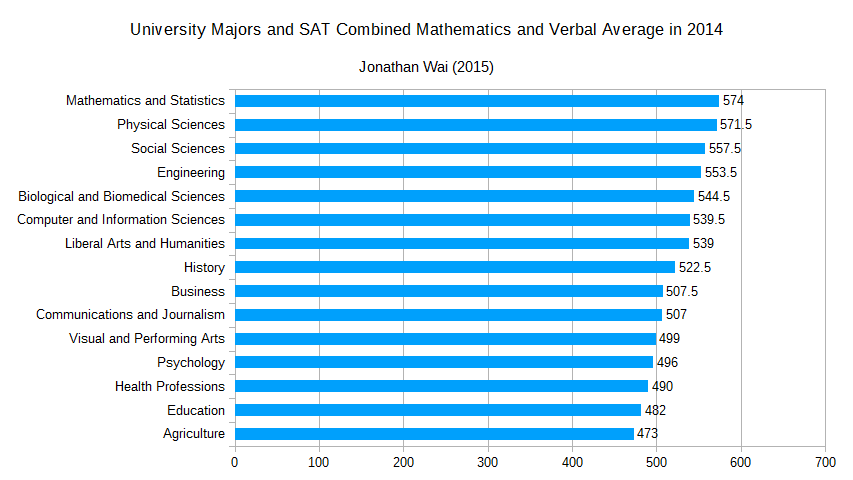

A 2020 paper by Laura H. Gunn and her colleagues examining data from 1,389 institutions across the United States unveiled strong positive correlations between the average SAT percentiles of incoming students and the shares of graduates majoring in STEM and the social sciences. On the other hand, they found negative correlations between the former and the shares of graduates in psychology, theology, law enforcement, recreation and fitness.

Various researchers have established that average SAT or ACT scores and college ranking in the U.S. News & World Report are highly correlated, almost 0.9. (Note: Depending on the author, there might be a negative sign. This comes from the fact that the higher the rank, the smaller the number of that rank.) Between the 1980s and the 2010s, the U.S. population grew while universities and colleges did not expand their capacities as substantially. As a result, admissions rates fell considerably, meaning it has become more difficult to get admitted to a school whose alumni include one's parents. On top of that, high-scoring students nowadays are much more likely to leave their hometowns in pursuit of higher education at prestigious institutions. Consequently, standardized tests, such as the SAT, are a more reliable measure of selectivity than admissions rates. Still, when Michael J. Petrilli and Pedro Enamorado analyzed the SAT composite scores (math and verbal) of incoming classes of 1985 and 2016 of the top universities and liberal arts colleges in the United States, they found that the median scores of new students increased by 93 points for their sample, from 1216 to 1309. In particular, fourteen institutions saw an increase of at least 150 points, including the University of Notre-Dame (from 1290 to 1440, or 150 points) and Elon College (from 952 to 1192, or 240 points).

=== Association with types of schooling ===
While there seems to be evidence that private schools tend to produce students who do better on standardized tests such as the ACT or the SAT, Keven Duncan and Jonathan Sandy showed, using data from the National Longitudinal Surveys of Youth, that when student characteristics, such as age, race, and sex (7%), family background (45%), school quality (26%), and other factors were taken into account, the advantage of private schools diminished by 78%. The researchers concluded that students attending private schools already had the attributes associated with high scores on their own.

=== Association with educational and societal standings and outcomes ===
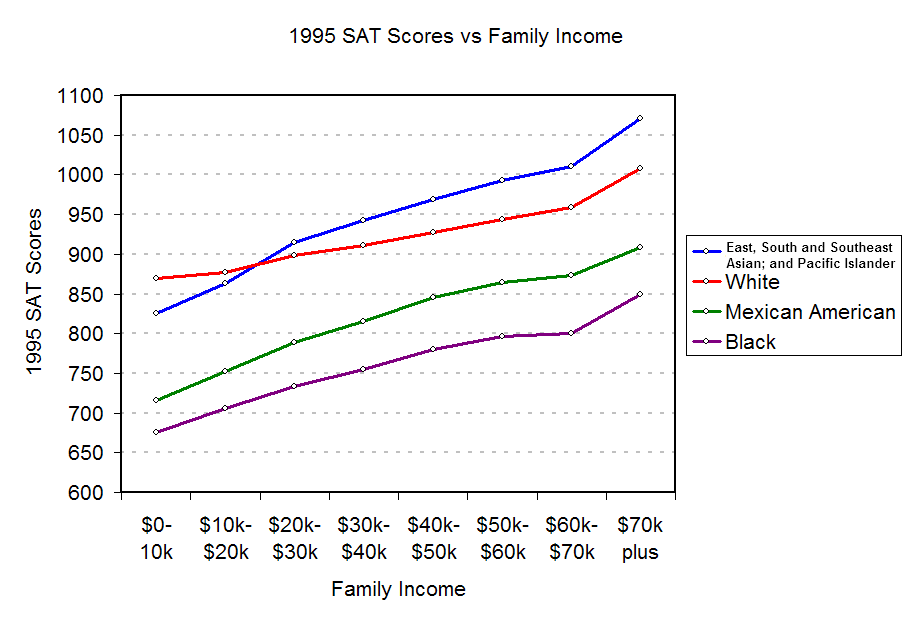

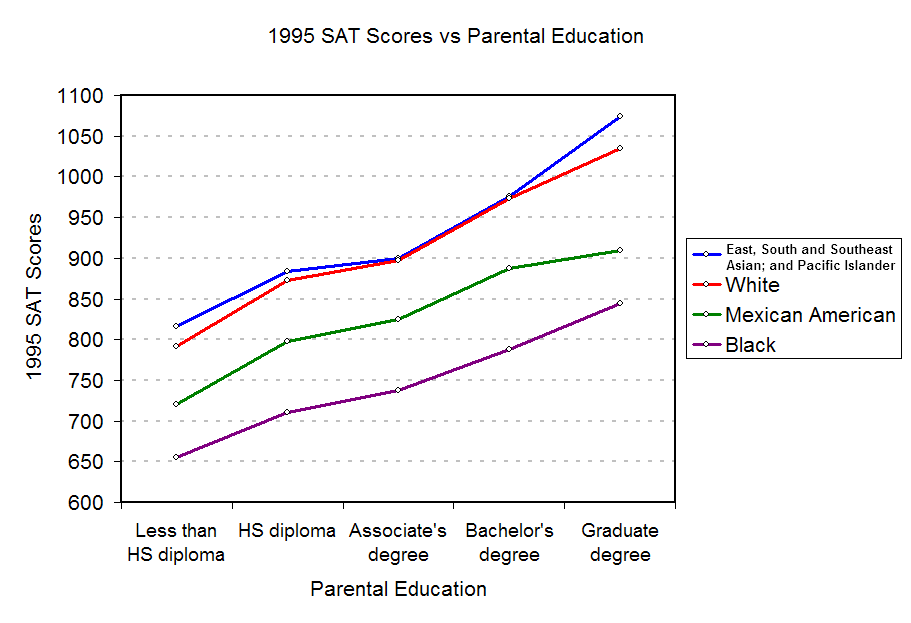

Research from the University of California system published in 2001 analyzing data of their undergraduates between Fall 1996 through Fall 1999, inclusive, found that the SAT II (Note: Known as the SAT Subject Tests since 2005, discontinued in 2021.) was the single best predictor of collegiate success in the sense of first-year GPA, followed by high-school GPA, and finally the SAT I. After controlling for family income and parental education, the already low ability of the SAT to measure aptitude and college readiness fell sharply while the more substantial aptitude and college readiness measuring abilities of high school GPA and the SAT II each remained undiminished (and even slightly increased). The University of California system required both the SAT I and the SAT II from applicants to the UC system during the four academic years of the study. This analysis is heavily publicized but is contradicted by many studies.

There is evidence that the SAT is correlated with societal and educational outcomes, including finishing a four-year university program. A 2012 paper from psychologists at the University of Minnesota analyzing multi-institutional data sets suggested that the SAT maintained its ability to predict collegiate performance even after controlling for socioeconomic status (as measured by the combination of parental educational attainment and income) and high-school GPA. This means that SAT scores were not merely a proxy for measuring socioeconomic status, the researchers concluded. This finding has been replicated and shown to hold across racial or ethnic groups and for both sexes. Moreover, the Minnesota researchers found that the socioeconomic status distributions of the student bodies of the schools examined reflected those of their respective applicant pools. Because of what it measures, a person's SAT scores cannot be separated from their socioeconomic background. However, the correlation between SAT scores and parental income or socioeconomic status should not be taken to mean causation. It could be that high scorers have intelligent parents who work cognitively demanding jobs and as such earn higher salaries. In addition, the correlation is only significant between biological families, not adoptive ones, suggesting that this might be due to genetic heritage, not economic wealth.

In 2007, Rebecca Zwick and Jennifer Greif Green observed that a typical analysis did not take into account that heterogeneity of the high schools attended by the students in terms of not just the socioeconomic statuses of the student bodies but also the standards of grading. Zwick and Greif Green proceeded to show that when these were accounted for, the correlation between family socioeconomic status and classroom grades and rank increased whereas that between socioeconomic status and SAT scores fell. They concluded that school grades and SAT scores were similarly associated with family income.

According to the College Board, in 2019, 56% of the test takers had parents with a university degree, 27% parents with no more than a high-school diploma, and about 9% who did not graduate from high school. (8% did not respond to the question.)

=== Association with family structures ===
One of the proposed partial explanations for the gap between Asian- and European-American students in educational achievement, as measured for example by the SAT, is the general tendency of Asians to come from stable two-parent households. The Economist reported in 2014 that children who had at least one parent with a graduate degree on average scored 400 points higher on the SAT (on a scale of 2,400) than those whose parents dropped out of high school. In their 2018 analysis of data from the National Longitudinal Surveys of the Bureau of Labor Statistics, economists Adam Blandin, Christopher Herrington, and Aaron Steelman concluded that family structure played an important role in determining educational outcomes in general and SAT scores in particular. Families with only one parent who has no degrees were designated 1L, with two parents but no degrees 2L, and two parents with at least one degree between them 2H. Children from 2H families held a significant advantage of those from 1L families, and this gap grew between 1990 and 2010. Because the median SAT composite scores (verbal and mathematics) for 2H families grew by 20 points while those of 1L families fell by one point, the gap between them increased by 21 points, or a fifth of one standard deviation.

=== Sex differences ===
==== In performance ====
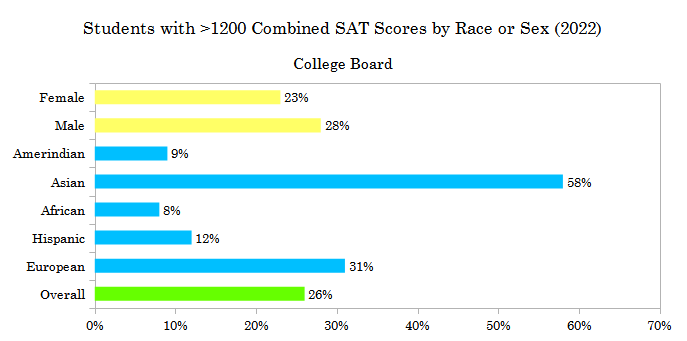
Sex and race differences exist in SAT scores

In 2013, the American College Testing Board released a report stating that boys outperformed girls on the mathematics section of the test, a significant gap that has persisted for over 35 years. As of 2015, boys on average earned 32 points more than girls on the SAT mathematics section. Among those scoring in the 700–800 range, the male-to-female ratio was 1.6:1. In 2014, psychologist Stephen Ceci and his collaborators found boys did better than girls across the percentiles. For example, a girl scoring in the top 10% of her sex would only be in the top 20% among the boys. In 2010, psychologist Jonathan Wai and his colleagues showed, by analyzing data from three decades involving 1.6 million intellectually gifted seventh graders from the Duke University Talent Identification Program (TIP), that in the 1980s the gender gap in the mathematics section of the SAT among students scoring in the top 0.01% was 13.5:1 in favor of boys but dropped to 3.8:1 by the 1990s. The dramatic sex ratio from the 1980s replicates a different study using a sample from Johns Hopkins University. This ratio is similar to that observed for the ACT mathematics and science scores between the early 1990s and the late 2000s. It remained largely unaltered at the end of the 2000s. Sex differences in SAT mathematics scores began making themselves apparent at the level of 400 points and above. In the late 2000s, for every female who scored a perfect 800 on the SAT mathematics test, there were two males.

Some researchers point to evidence in support of greater male variability in verbal and quantitative reasoning skills. Greater male variability has been found in body weight, height, and cognitive abilities across cultures, leading to a larger number of males in the lowest and highest distributions of testing. Consequently, a higher number of males are found in both the upper and lower extremes of the performance distributions of the mathematics sections of standardized tests such as the SAT, resulting in the observed gender discrepancy. Paradoxically, this is at odds with the tendency of girls to have higher classroom scores than boys, proving that they do not lack scholastic aptitude. However, boys tend to do better on standardized test questions not directly related to the curriculum.

On the other hand, Wai and his colleagues found that both sexes in the top 5% appeared to be more or less at parity when it comes to the verbal section of the SAT, though girls have gained a slight but noticeable edge over boys starting in the mid-1980s. Psychologist David Lubinski, who conducted longitudinal studies of seventh graders who scored exceptionally high on the SAT, found a similar result. Girls generally had better verbal reasoning skills and boys mathematical skills. This reflects other research on the cognitive ability of the general population rather than just the 95th percentile and up.

Although aspects of testing such as stereotype threat are a concern, research on the predictive validity of the SAT has demonstrated that it tends to be a more accurate predictor of female GPA in university as compared to male GPA.

==== In strategizing ====
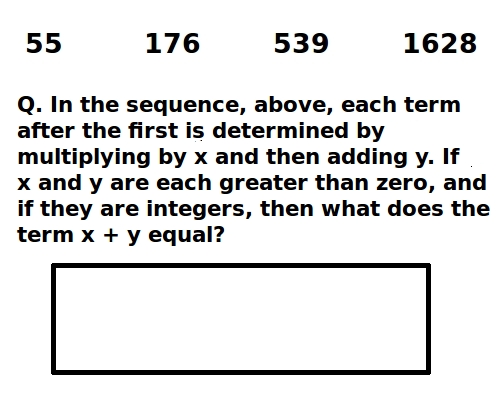
SAT mathematics questions can be answered intuitively or algorithmically

Mathematical problems on the SAT can be broadly categorized into two groups: conventional and unconventional. Conventional problems can be handled routinely via familiar formulas or algorithms while unconventional ones require more creative thought in order to make unusual use of familiar methods of solution or to come up with the specific insights necessary for solving those problems. In 2000, ETS psychometrician Ann M. Gallagher and her colleagues analyzed how students handled disclosed SAT mathematics questions in self-reports. They found that for both sexes, the most favored approach was to use formulas or algorithms learned in class. When that failed, however, males were more likely than females to identify the suitable methods of solution. Previous research suggested that males were more likely to explore unusual paths to solution whereas females tended to stick to what they had learned in class and that females were more likely to identify the appropriate approaches if such required nothing more than mastery of classroom materials.

==== In confidence ====
Older versions of the SAT did ask students how confident they were in their mathematical aptitude and verbal reasoning ability, specifically, whether or not they believed they were in the top 10%. Devin G. Pope analyzed data of over four million test takers from the late 1990s to the early 2000s and found that high scorers were more likely to be confident they were in the top 10%, with the top scorers reporting the highest levels of confidence. But there were some noticeable gaps between the sexes. Men tended to be much more confident in their mathematical aptitude than women. For example, among those who scored 700 on the mathematics section, 67% of men answered they believed they were in the top 10% whereas only 56% of women did the same. Women, on the other hand, were slightly more confident in their verbal reasoning ability than men.

==== In glucose metabolism ====
Cognitive neuroscientists Richard Haier and Camilla Persson Benbow employed positron emission tomography (PET) scans to investigate the rate of glucose metabolism among students who have taken the SAT. They found that among men, those with higher SAT mathematics scores exhibited higher rates of glucose metabolism in the temporal lobes than those with lower scores, contradicting the brain-efficiency hypothesis. This trend, however, was not found among women, for whom the researchers could not find any cortical regions associated with mathematical reasoning. Both sexes scored the same on average in their sample and had the same rates of cortical glucose metabolism overall. According to Haier and Benbow, this is evidence for the structural differences of the brain between the sexes.

=== Association with race and ethnicity ===
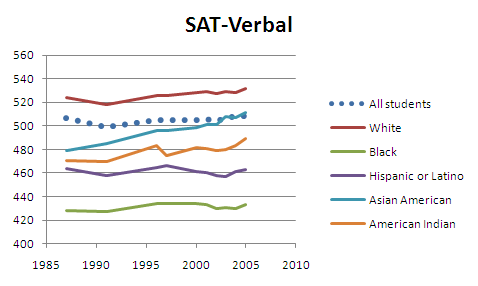
SAT Verbal average scores by race or ethnicity from 1986–87 to 2004–05

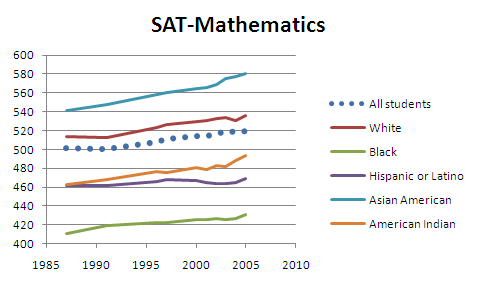
SAT Math average scores by race or ethnicity from 1986–87 to 2004–05

A 2001 meta-analysis of the results of 6,246,729 participants tested for cognitive ability or aptitude found a difference in average scores between black and white students of around 1.0 standard deviation, with comparable results for the SAT (2.4 million test takers). Similarly, on average, Hispanic and Amerindian students perform on the order of one standard deviation lower on the SAT than white and Asian students. Mathematics appears to be the more difficult part of the exam. In 1996, the black-white gap in the mathematics section was 0.91 standard deviations, but by 2020, it fell to 0.79. In 2013, Asian Americans as a group scored 0.38 standard deviations higher than whites in the mathematics section.

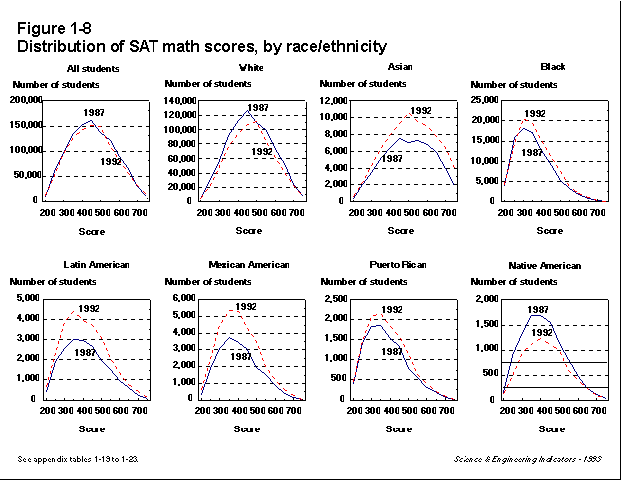

Some researchers believe that the difference in scores is closely related to the overall achievement gap in American society between students of different racial groups. This gap may be explainable in part by the fact that students of disadvantaged racial groups tend to go to schools that provide lower educational quality. This view is supported by evidence that the black-white gap is higher in cities and neighborhoods that are more racially segregated. Other research cites poorer minority proficiency in key coursework relevant to the SAT (English and math), as well as peer pressure against students who try to focus on their schoolwork ("acting white"). Cultural issues are also evident among black students in wealthier households, with high achieving parents. John Ogbu, a Nigerian-American professor of anthropology, concluded that instead of looking to their parents as role models, black youth chose other models like rappers and did not make an effort to be good students.

One set of studies has reported differential item functioning, namely, that some test questions function differently based on the racial group of the test taker, reflecting differences in ability to understand certain test questions or to acquire the knowledge required to answer them between groups. In 2003, Freedle published data showing that black students have had a slight advantage on the verbal questions that are labeled as difficult on the SAT, whereas white and Asian students tended to have a slight advantage on questions labeled as easy. Freedle argued that these findings suggest that "easy" test items use vocabulary that is easier to understand for white middle class students than for minorities, who often use a different language in the home environment, whereas the difficult items use complex language learned only through lectures and textbooks, giving both student groups equal opportunities to acquiring it. The study was severely criticized by the ETS board, but the findings were replicated in a subsequent study by Santelices and Wilson in 2010.

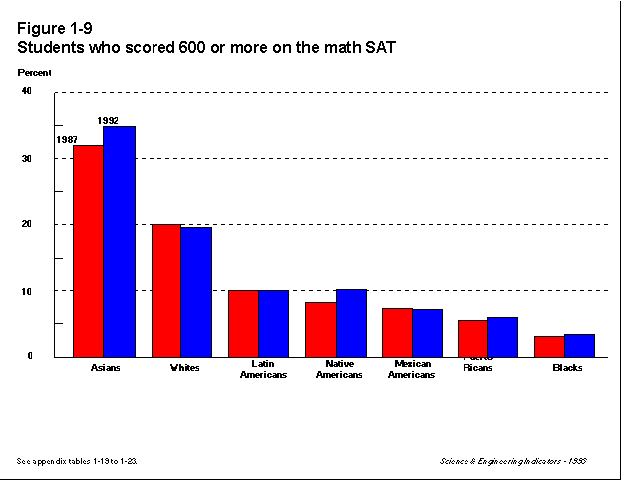

There is no evidence that SAT scores systematically underestimate future performance of minority students. However, the predictive validity of the SAT has been shown to depend on the dominant ethnic and racial composition of the college. Some studies have also shown that African-American students under-perform in college relative to their white peers with the same SAT scores; researchers have argued that this is likely because white students tend to benefit from social advantages outside of the educational environment (for example, high parental involvement in their education, inclusion in campus academic activities, positive bias from same-race teachers and peers) which result in better grades.

Christopher Jencks concludes that as a group, African Americans have been harmed by the introduction of standardized entrance exams such as the SAT. This, according to him, is not because the tests themselves are flawed, but because of labeling bias and selection bias; the tests measure the skills that African Americans are less likely to develop in their socialization, rather than the skills they are more likely to develop. Furthermore, standardized entrance exams are often labeled as tests of general ability, rather than of certain aspects of ability. Thus, a situation is produced in which African-American ability is consistently underestimated within the education and workplace environments, contributing in turn to selection bias against them which exacerbates underachievement.

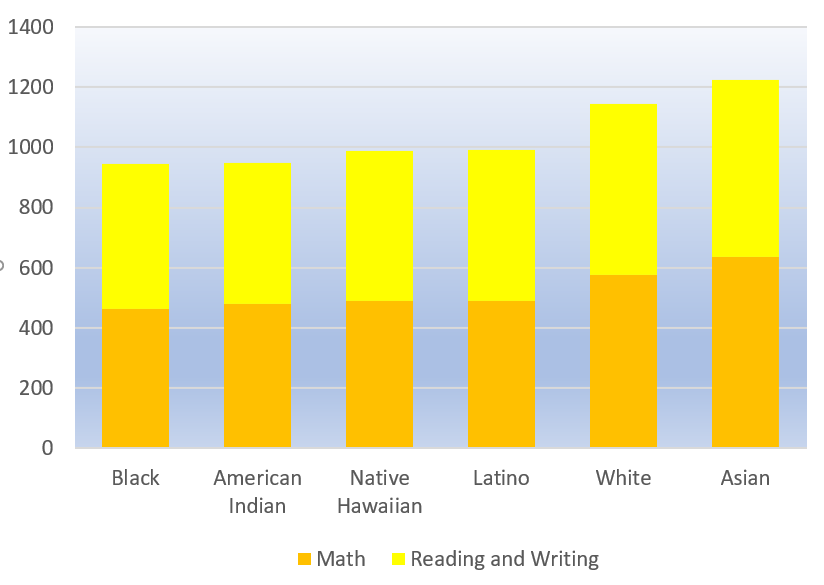
2018 SAT combined scores by race and ethnicity

Among the major racial or ethnic groups of the United States, gaps in SAT mathematics scores are the greatest at the tails, with Hispanic and Latino Americans being the most likely to score at the lowest range and Asian Americans the highest. In addition, there is some evidence suggesting that if the test contains more questions of both the easy and difficult varieties, which would increase the variability of the scores, the gaps would be even wider. Given the distribution for Asians, for example, many could score higher than 800 if the test allowed them to. (See figure below.)

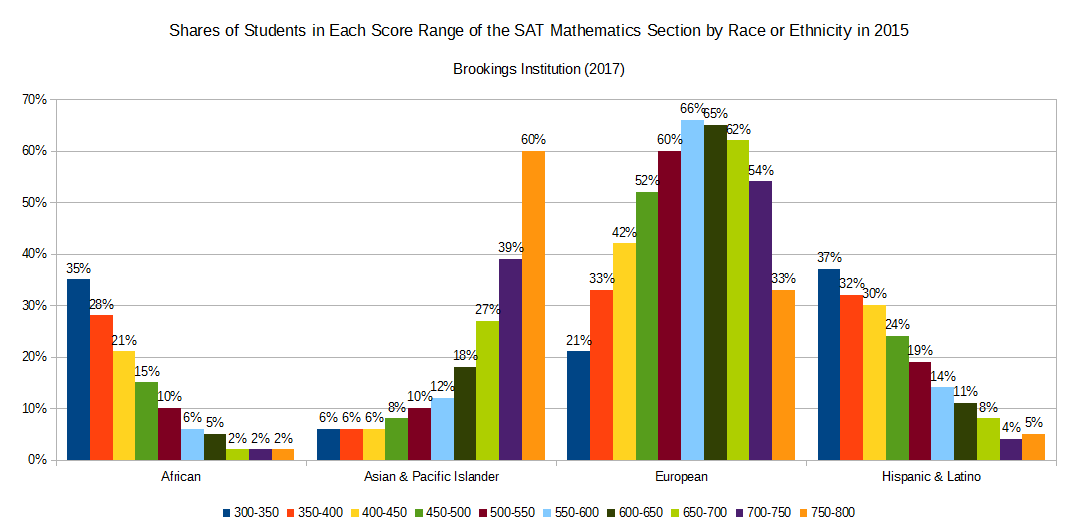

2020 was the year in which education worldwide was disrupted by the COVID-19 pandemic and indeed, the performance of students in the United States on standardized tests, such as the SAT, suffered. Yet the gaps persisted. According to the College Board, in 2020, while 83% of Asian students met the benchmark of college readiness in reading and writing and 80% in mathematics, only 44% and 21% of black students did those respective categories. Among whites, 79% met the benchmark for reading and writing and 59% did mathematics. For Hispanics and Latinos, the numbers were 53% and 30%, respectively. (See figure below.)

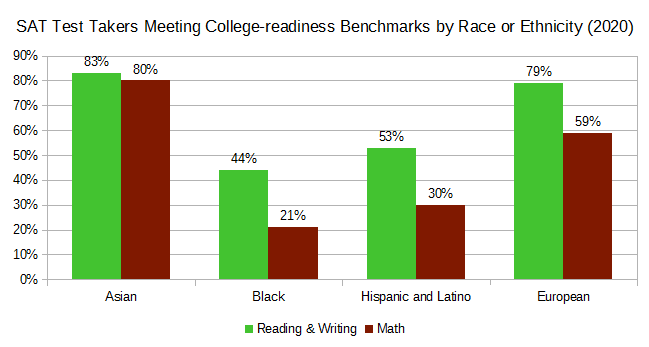

=== Test-taking population ===
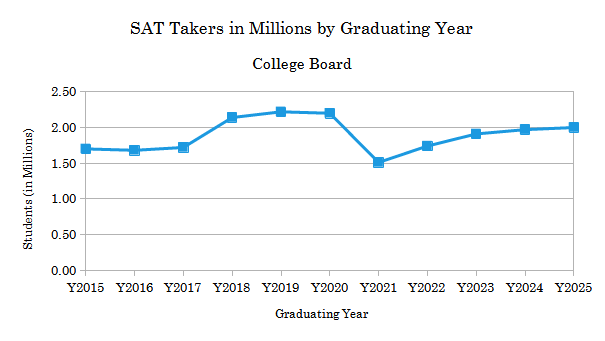
The number of SAT takers has been approaching pre-pandemic levels.

By analyzing data from the National Center for Education Statistics, economists Ember Smith and Richard Reeves of the Brookings Institution deduced that the number of students taking the SAT increased at a rate faster than population and high-school graduation growth rates between 2000 and 2020. The increase was especially pronounced among Hispanics and Latinos. Even among whites, whose number of high-school graduates was shrinking, the number of SAT takers rose. In 2015, for example, 1.7 million students took the SAT, up from 1.6 million in 2013. But in 2019, a record-breaking 2.2 million students took the exam, compared to 2.1 million in 2018, another record-breaking year. The rise in the number of students taking the SAT was due in part to many school districts offering to administer the SAT during school days often at no further costs to the students. Some require students to take the SAT, regardless of whether or not they are going to college. However, in 2021, in the wake of the COVID-19 pandemic and the optional status of the SAT at many colleges and universities, only 1.5 million students took the test. But as testing centers reopened, ambitious students chose to take the SAT or the ACT to make themselves stand out from the competition regardless of the admissions policies of their preferred schools. Among the class of 2023, 1.9 million students took the test.

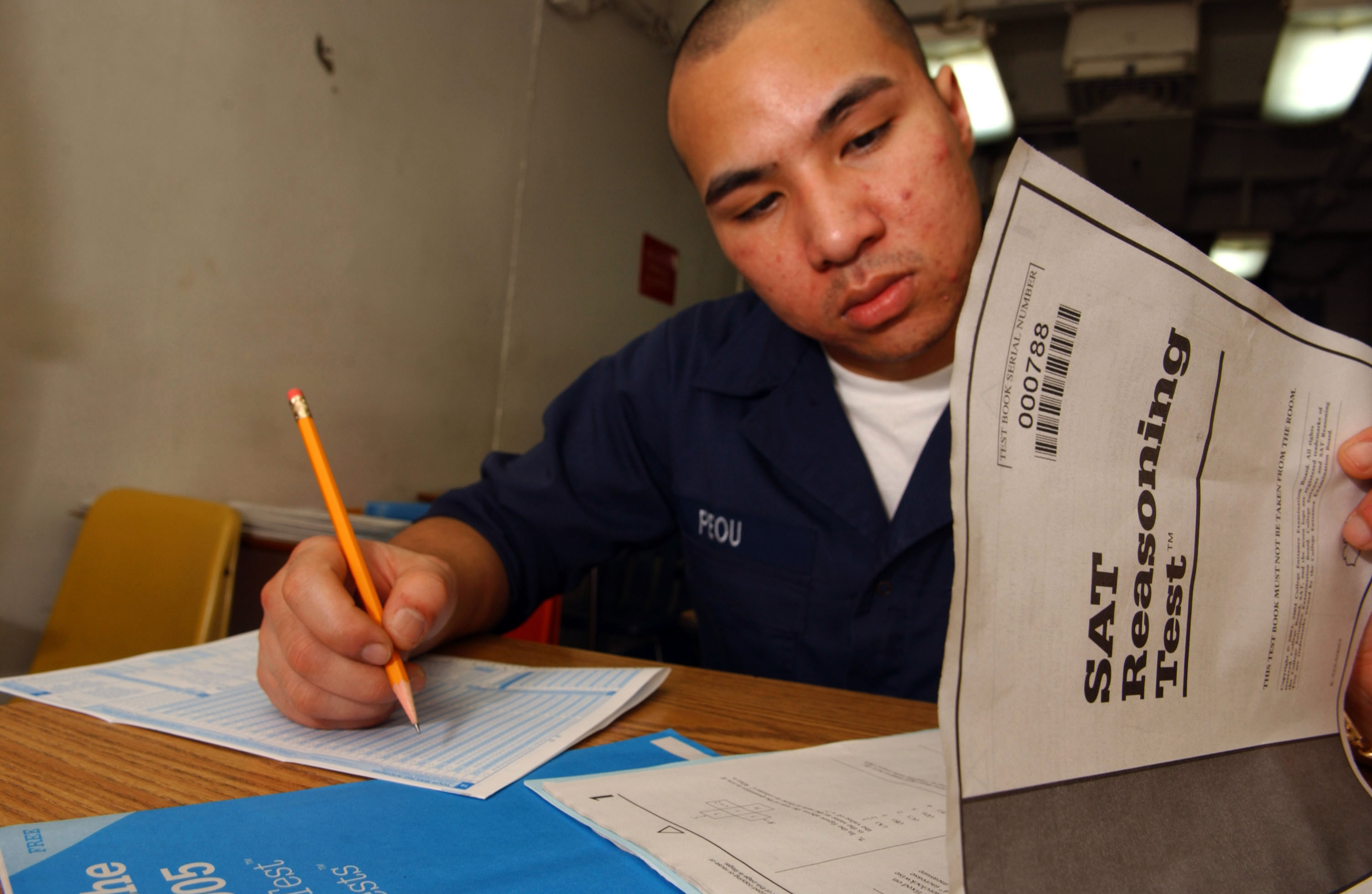
A U.S. Navy sailor taking the SAT aboard the U.S.S Kitty Hawk (CV-63) in 2004

Psychologists Jean Twenge, W. Keith Campbell, and Ryne A. Sherman analyzed vocabulary test scores on the U.S. General Social Survey ($n = 29,912$) and found that after correcting for education, the use of sophisticated vocabulary has declined between the mid-1970s and the mid-2010s across all levels of education, from below high school to graduate school. However, they cautioned against the use of SAT verbal scores to track the decline for while the College Board reported that SAT verbal scores had been decreasing, these scores were an imperfect measure of the vocabulary level of the nation as a whole because the test-taking demographic has changed and because more students took the SAT in the 2010s than in the 1970s, meaning there were more with limited ability who took it. However, as the frequency of reading for pleasure and the level of reading comprehension among American high-school students continue to decline, students who take the SAT might struggle to do well, even if reforms have been introduced to shorten the duration of the test and to reduce the number of questions associated with a given passage in the verbal portion of the test.

=== Use in non-collegiate contexts ===
==== By high-IQ societies ====
Certain high IQ societies, like Mensa, Intertel, the Prometheus Society and the Triple Nine Society, use scores from certain years as one of their admission tests. For instance, Intertel accepts scores (verbal and math combined) of at least 1300 on tests taken through January 1994; the Triple Nine Society accepts scores of 1450 or greater on SAT tests taken before April 1995, and scores of at least 1520 on tests taken between April 1995 and February 2005. Mensa accepts qualifying SAT scores earned on or before January 31, 1994.

==== By researchers ====
Because it is strongly correlated with general intelligence, the SAT has often been used as a proxy to measure intelligence by researchers, especially since 2004. In particular, scientists studying mathematically gifted individuals have been using the mathematics section of the SAT to identify subjects for their research.

A growing body of research indicates that SAT scores can predict individual success decades into the future, for example in terms of income and occupational achievements. A longitudinal study published in 2005 by educational psychologists Jonathan Wai, David Lubinski, and Camilla Benbow suggests that among the intellectually precocious (the top 1%), those with higher scores in the mathematics section of the SAT at the age of 12 were more likely to earn a PhD in the STEM fields, to have a publication, to register a patent, or to secure university tenure. Wai further showed that an individual's academic ability, as measured by the average SAT or ACT scores of the institution attended, predicted individual differences in income, even among the richest people of all, and being a member of the cognitive elite of the United States, namely Fortune 500 CEOs, billionaires, federal judges, and members of Congress. Wai concluded that the American elite was also the cognitive elite. Gregory Park, Lubinski, and Benbow gave statistical evidence that intellectually gifted adolescents, as identified by SAT scores, could be expected to accomplish great feats of creativity in the future, both in the arts and in STEM.

The SAT is sometimes given to students at age 12 or 13 by organizations such as the Study of Mathematically Precocious Youth (SMPY), Johns Hopkins Center for Talented Youth, and the Duke University Talent Identification Program (TIP) to select, study, and mentor students of exceptional ability, that is, those in the top one percent. Among SMPY participants, those within the top quartile, as indicated by the SAT composite score (mathematics and verbal), were markedly more likely to have a doctoral degree, to have at least one publication in STEM, to earn income in the 95th percentile, to have at least one literary publication, or to register at least one patent than those in the bottom quartile. Duke TIP participants generally picked career tracks in STEM should they be stronger in mathematics, as indicated by SAT mathematics scores, or the humanities if they possessed greater verbal ability, as indicated by SAT verbal scores. For comparison, the bottom SMPY quartile is five times more likely than the average American to have a patent. Meanwhile, as of 2016, the shares of doctorates among SMPY participants was 44% and Duke TIP 37%, compared to two percent among the general U.S. population. Consequently, the notion that beyond a certain point, differences in cognitive ability as measured by standardized tests such as the SAT cease to matter is gainsaid by the evidence.

In the 2010 paper which showed that the sex gap in SAT mathematics scores had dropped dramatically between the early 1980s and the early 1990s but had persisted for the next two decades or so, Wai and his colleagues argued that "sex differences in abilities in the extreme right tail should not be dismissed as no longer part of the explanation for the dearth of women in math-intensive fields of science."

Walter Mischel and his colleagues discovered that children's capacity for delaying gratification, as measured by the Oreo or marshmallow test, was a strong predictor of SAT scores, among other measurable life outcomes, such as educational levels and substance abuse.

Independent studies using regression discontinuity reveal that students scoring just above or below the cutoff for admissions to exam or magnet schools in the United States eventually earned statistically equal SAT or AP scores and subsequently attended similarly prestigious universities and colleges. In other words, attending these schools has no real effect on the students' academic performance.

Bob Uttl and his collaborators used SAT scores to demonstrate that the typical university students in the 2020s United States had an IQ score of 102, close to the population average (100), rather than at least one standard deviation (15 points) above the mean, which had been the case during the 1950s. According to them, this decline is a consequence of the expansion of higher education in the United States.

==== By employers ====
Cognitive ability is correlated with job training outcomes and job performance. As such, some employers rely on SAT scores to assess the suitability of a prospective recruit, especially if the person has limited work experience. There is nothing new about this practice. Major companies and corporations have spent princely sums on learning how to avoid hiring errors and have decided that standardized test scores are a valuable tool in deciding whether or not a person is fit for the job. In some cases, a company might need to hire someone to handle proprietary materials of its own making, such as computer software. But since the ability to work with such materials cannot be assessed via external certification, it makes sense for such a firm to rely on something that is a proxy of measuring general intelligence. In other cases, a firm may not care about academic background but needs to assess a prospective recruit's quantitative reasoning ability, and what makes standardized test scores necessary. Several companies, especially those considered to be the most prestigious in industries such as investment banking and management consulting such as Goldman Sachs and McKinsey, have been reported to ask prospective job candidates about their SAT scores.

Nevertheless, some other top employers, such as Google, have eschewed the use of SAT or other standardized test scores unless the potential employee is a recent graduate. Google's Laszlo Bock explained to The New York Times, "We found that they don't predict anything." Educational psychologist Jonathan Wai suggested this might be due to the inability of the SAT to differentiate the intellectual capacities of those at the extreme right end of the distribution of intelligence. Wai told The New York Times, "Today the SAT is actually too easy, and that's why Google doesn't see a correlation. Every single person they get through the door is a super-high scorer."

== Perception ==
=== Math–verbal achievement gap ===
In 2002, New York Times columnist Richard Rothstein argued that the U.S. math averages on the SAT and ACT continued their decade-long rise over national verbal averages on the tests while the averages of verbal portions on the same tests were floundering.

=== Optional SAT ===
During the 1960s and 1970s, there was a movement to drop achievement scores. After some time, the countries, states, and provinces that reintroduced them agreed that academic standards had dropped, students had studied less, and had taken their education less seriously. Testing requirements were reinstated in some places after research concluded that these high-stakes tests produced benefits that outweighed the costs. However, in a 2001 speech to the American Council on Education, Richard C. Atkinson, the president of the University of California, urged the dropping of aptitude tests such as the SAT I but not achievement tests such as the SAT II as a college admissions requirement. Atkinson's critique of the predictive validity and powers of the SAT has been contested by the University of California academic senate. In April 2020, the academic senate, which consisted of faculty members, voted 51–0 to restore the requirement of standardized test scores, but the governing board overruled the academic senate and did not reinstate the test requirement anyway. Because of the size of the Californian population, this decision might have an impact on U.S. higher education at large; schools looking to admit Californian students could have a harder time.

During the 2010s, over 1,230 American universities and colleges opted to stop requiring the SAT and the ACT for admissions, according to FairTest, an activist group opposing standardized entrance exams. Most, however, were small colleges, with the notable exceptions of the University of California system and the University of Chicago. Also on the list are institutions catering to niche students, such as religious colleges, arts and music conservatories, or nursing schools, and the majority of institutions in the Northeastern United States. In the wake of the COVID-19 pandemic, around 1,600 institutions decided to waive the requirement of the SAT or the ACT for admissions because it was challenging both to administer and to take these tests, resulting in many cancellations. Some schools chose to make them optional on a temporary basis only, either for just one year, as in the case of Princeton University, or three, like the College of William & Mary. Others dropped the requirement completely. Some schools extended their moratorium on standardized entrance exams in 2021. This did not stop highly ambitious students from taking them, however, as many parents and teenagers were skeptical of the "optional" status of university entrance exams and wanted to make their applications more likely to catch the attention of admission officers. This led to complaints of registration sites crashing in the summer of 2020. On the other hand, the number of students applying to the more competitive of schools that had made SAT and ACT scores optional increased dramatically because the students thought they stood a chance. Ivy League institutions saw double-digit increases in the number of applications, as high as 51% in the case of Columbia University, while their admission rates, already in the single digits, fell, e.g. from 4.9% in 2020 to just 3.4% in 2021 at Harvard University. At the same time, interest in lower-status schools that did the same thing dropped precipitously; the college application process remains driven primarily by the preference for elite schools. 44% of students who used the Common Application—accepted by over 900 colleges and universities as of 2021—submitted SAT or ACT scores in the 2020–21 academic year, down from 77% in 2019–20. Those who did submit their test scores tended to hail from high-income families, to have at least one university-educated parent, and to be white or Asian.

Despite the fallout from Operation Varsity Blues, which found many wealthy parents illegally intervening to raise their children's standardized test scores, the SAT and the ACT remain popular among American parents and college-bound seniors, who are skeptical of the process of "holistic admissions" because they think it is rather opaque, as schools try to access characteristics not easily discerned via a number, hence the growth in the number of test takers attempting to make themselves more competitive even if this parallels an increase in the number of schools declaring it optional. While holistic admissions might seem like a plausible alternative, the process of applying can be rather stressful for students and parents, and many get upset once they learn that someone else got into the school that rejected them despite having lower SAT scores and GPAs. Holistic admissions notwithstanding, when merit-based scholarships are considered, standardized test scores might be the tiebreakers, as these are highly competitive. Scholarships and financial aid could help students and their parents significantly cut the cost of higher education, especially in times of economic hardship. Moreover, the most selective of schools might have no better options than using standardized test scores in order to quickly prune the number of applications worth considering, for holistic admissions consume valuable time and other resources.

Following the 2023 ruling by the Supreme Court of the United States against race-based admissions as a form of affirmative action, a number of schools have signaled their intent to continue pursuing ethnic diversity. One way for them to adapt to the new legal reality is to drop the requirement of standardized testing, making it more difficult for potential plaintiffs (Asian Americans in the twin cases of SFFA v. Harvard and SFFA v UNC) to find concrete evidence for their allegations of discrimination.

On one hand, making the SAT and the ACT optional for admissions enables schools to attract a larger pool of applicants of a variety of socioeconomic backgrounds. On the other hand, letters of recommendation are not a good indicator of collegiate performance, and grade inflation is a genuine problem. If standardized tests were taken out of the picture, school grades would become more important, thereby incentivizing grade inflation. In fact, grades in American high schools have been inflating by noticeable amounts due to pressure from parents, creating an apparent oversupply of high achievers that makes actual high-performing students struggle to stand out, especially if they are from low-income families. Schools that made the SAT optional therefore lost an objective measure of academic aptitude and readiness, and they will have to formulate a new methodology for admissions or to develop their own entrance exams. Given that the selectivity of a school a student applies to is correlated with the resources of his or her high school—measured in terms of the availability of rigorous courses, such as AP classes, and the socioeconomic statuses of the student body—, making the SAT optional might exacerbate social inequities. Furthermore, since the costs of attending institutions of higher learning in the United States are high, eliminating the SAT requirement could make said institutions more likely to admit under-performing students, who might have to be removed for their low academic standing and who might be saddled with debt after attending. Another criticism of making the SAT optional is that subjective measures of an applicant's suitability, such as application essays, could become more important, making it easier for the rich to gain admissions at the expense of the poor because their school counselors are more capable of writing good letters of recommendation and they can afford to hire external help to boost their applications.

It was due to these concerns that the Massachusetts Institute of Technology (MIT) decided to reinstate its SAT requirement in 2022. Many other universities across the U.S. followed suit in 2024. However, the University of North Carolina system will only require SAT or ACT scores from applicants whose high-school GPA is below 2.8 while the University of California system will continue to be test-blind.

=== Writing section ===
In 2005, MIT Writing Director Les Perelman plotted essay length versus essay score on the new SAT from released essays and found a high correlation between them. After studying over 50 graded essays, he found that longer essays consistently produced higher scores. In fact, he argues that by simply gauging the length of an essay without reading it, the given score of an essay could likely be determined correctly over 90% of the time. He also discovered that several of these essays were full of factual errors; the College Board does not claim to grade for factual accuracy.

Perelman, along with the National Council of Teachers of English, also criticized the 25-minute writing section of the test for damaging standards of writing teaching in the classroom. They say that writing teachers training their students for the SAT will not focus on revision, depth, accuracy, but will instead produce long, formulaic, and wordy pieces. "You're getting teachers to train students to be bad writers", concluded Perelman.

On January 19, 2021, the College Board announced that the SAT would no longer offer the optional essay section after the June 2021 administration.

== History ==
Historical average SAT scores of college-bound seniors.

The College Board, the not-for-profit organization that owns the SAT, was organized at the beginning of the 20th century to provide uniform entrance exams for its member colleges, whose matriculating students often came from boarding and private day schools found in the Northeastern United States. The exams were essay-based, graded by hand, and required several days for the student to take them. By the early 1920s, the increasing interest in intelligence tests as a means of selection convinced the College Board to form a commission to produce such a test for college admission purposes. The leader of the commission was Carl Brigham, a psychologist at Princeton University, who originally saw the value of these types of tests through the lens of eugenic thought.

On June 23, 1926, the first SAT, then known as the Scholastic Aptitude Test, was administered to 8,040 students, 60% of whom were male, many of whom were applying to Yale University (26%) and Smith College (27%). In 1934, James Conant and Henry Chauncey used the SAT as a means to identify recipients, besides those from the traditional northeastern private schools, for scholarships to Harvard University. By 1942, the College Board suspended the use of the essay exams, replacing them with the SAT, due in part to the success of Harvard's SAT program as well as because of the constraints from the onset of World War II. At this time, the SAT was standardized so that a test score received by a student in one year could be directly compared to a score received by a student in another year. Test scores ranged from 200 to 800 on each of two test sections (verbal and math) and the same reference group of students was used to standardize the SAT until 1995.

Logo as of 2013

After the war, due to several factors including the formation of the Educational Testing Service, the use of the SAT increased rapidly: by 1951, about 80,000 SATs were taken, rising to about 1.5 million in 1971. During this time, changes made to the content of the SAT were relatively minor, and included the introduction of sentence completion questions and "quantitative comparison" math questions as well as changes in the timing of the test. In 1994, however, the SAT was substantially changed in an attempt to make the test more closely reflect the work done by students in school and the skills that they would need in college. Among other changes, antonym questions were removed from the verbal section, and free response questions were added to the math section along with the use of calculators. In 1995, after nearly forty years of declining scores, the SAT was recalibrated by the addition of approximately 100 points to each score to compensate for the decline in what constituted an average score.

In 2005, the SAT was changed again, in part due to criticism of the test by the University of California system, which said that the test was not closely enough aligned to high school curricula. Along with the elimination of analogies from the verbal section and quantitative comparison items from the math section, a new writing section with an essay was added. The changes introduced an additional section score, increasing the maximum SAT score to 2400.

In early 2016, the SAT would change again in the interest of alignment with typical high school curricula. The changes included making the essay optional (and returning the maximum score to 1600), changing all multiple-choice questions from having five answer options to four, and the removal of penalty for wrong answers (rights-only scoring). The essay was completely removed from the SAT by mid-2021, in the interest of reducing demands on students in the context of the COVID-19 pandemic.

== Name changes ==
The old SAT logo

The SAT has been renamed several times since its introduction in 1926. It was originally known as the Scholastic Aptitude Test. In 1990, a commission set up by the College Board to review the proposed changes to the SAT program recommended that the meaning of the initialism SAT be changed to "Scholastic Assessment Test" because a "test that integrates measures of achievement as well as developed ability can no longer be accurately described as a test of aptitude". In 1993, the College Board changed the name of the test to SAT I: Reasoning Test; at the same time, the name of the SAT Achievement Tests was changed to SAT II: Subject Tests. The Reasoning Test and Subject Tests were to be collectively known as the Scholastic Assessment Tests. According to the president of the College Board at the time, the name change was meant "to correct the impression among some people that the SAT measures something that is innate and impervious to change regardless of effort or instruction." The new SAT debuted in March 1994, and was referred to as the Scholastic Assessment Test by major news organizations. However, in 1997, the College Board announced that the SAT could not properly be called the Scholastic Assessment Test, and that the letters SAT did not stand for anything. In 2004, the Roman numeral in SAT I: Reasoning Test was dropped, making SAT Reasoning Test the name of the SAT. The "Reasoning Test" portion of the name was eliminated following the exam's 2016 redesign; it is now simply called the SAT.

== Reuse of old SAT exams ==
The College Board has been accused of completely reusing old SAT papers previously given in the United States. The recycling of questions from previous exams has been exploited to allow for cheating on exams and impugned the validity of some students' test scores. Test preparation companies in Asia have been found to provide test questions to students within hours of a new SAT exam's administration.

On August 25, 2018, the SAT test given in the United States was discovered to be a recycled October 2017 international SAT test given in China. The leaked PDF file was on the internet before the August 25, 2018, exam.

== See also ==
- ACT (test), a college entrance exam, competitor to the SAT
- College admissions in the United States
- List of admissions tests
- Mathematics education in the United States
- PSAT/NMSQT
- SAT Subject Tests
