= Mario Deng =

German-Chinese cardiologist

Mario Chih-Hsiung Karl Deng
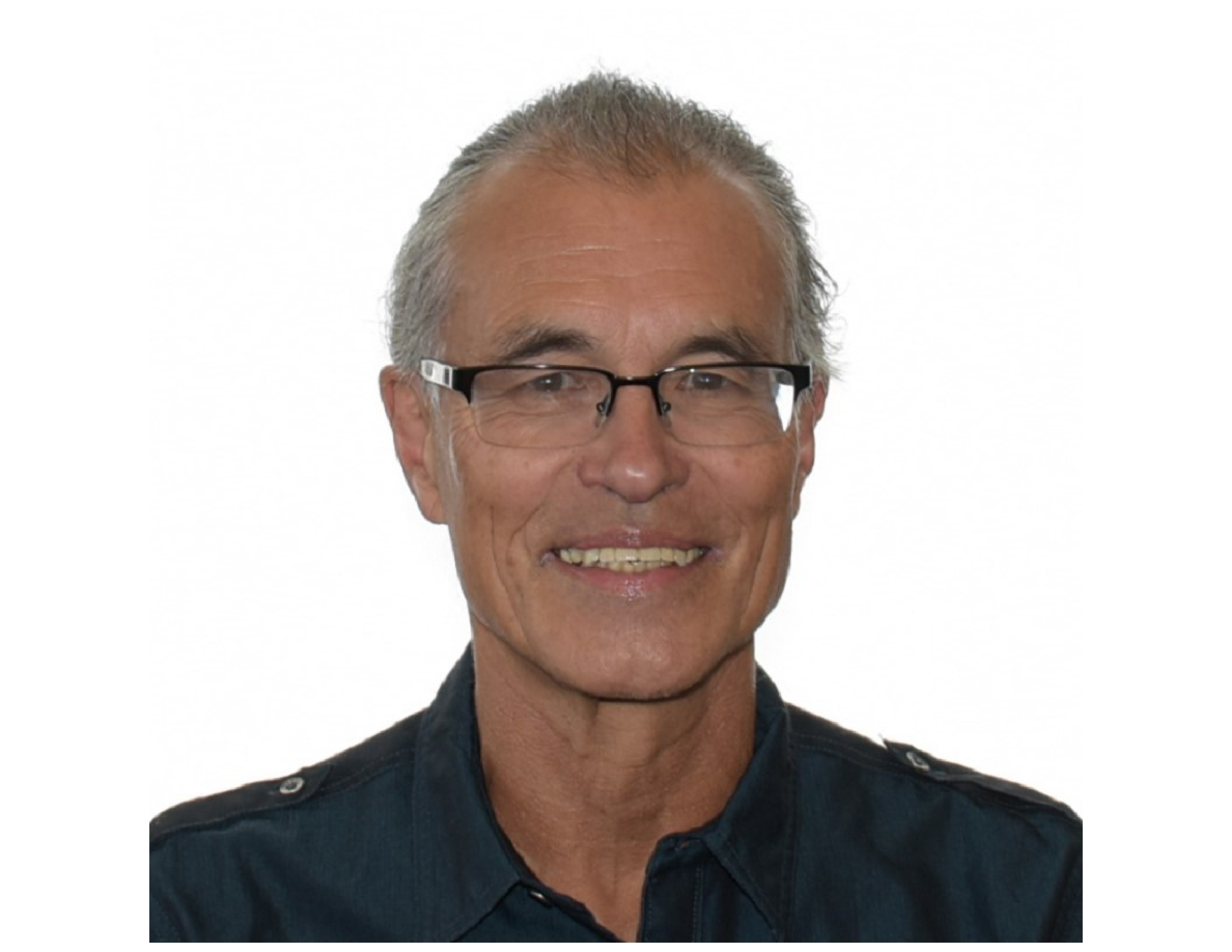
- Education: University of Hamburg, Free University of Berlin, Stanford University
- Awards: Forbes 27 Top Cardiologists
- Scientific career
- Fields: Cardiology

Mario Chih-Hsiung Karl Deng is a German-Chinese cardiologist specialized in the care of patients with advanced heart failure. Deng is a professor of medicine in the David Geffen School of Medicine at the University of California, Los Angeles.

== Biography ==
Deng was born in West Berlin as the only child of a Chinese forestry scientist (father) and a German lawyer (mother).

Deng earned his medical degree from Berlin University in 1981 and completed specialty and subspecialty training in internal medicine and cardiology in Germany. He undertook a postdoctoral fellowship at Stanford University, where he conducted pioneering gene expression studies in heart transplantation models.

== Career ==
Deng began his academic career at Muenster University in Germany, where he served as an Assistant Professor of Medicine from 1992 to 1995 and then as an Associate Professor of Medicine until 2000. During this time, he was the Medical Director of the Interdisciplinary Heart Failure and Heart Transplant Program at Muenster University from 1992 to 2000.

Deng also held leadership roles within German medical societies, including Secretary of the Heart Committee of the German Transplantation Society from 1996 to 1999 and Chairman of the German Physicians Association Committee on Heart Transplantation Allocation Rules from 1998 to 1999. Additionally, he chaired the Working Group on Heart Transplantation for the German Cardiac Society between 1997 and 1999.

From 1992 to 2000, Deng became a professor at the University of Münster, building the Interdisciplinary Heart Failure and Heart Transplant Program of Muenster University. In 2000, Deng joined Columbia University as the Director of Cardiac Transplantation Research. In 2001, Deng was appointed the founding medical director of the Mechanical Circulatory Support Database of the International Society for Heart and Lung Transplantation.

Since 2011, Deng has been a Professor of Medicine at the University of California, Los Angeles (UCLA), where he directed the Advanced Heart Failure, Mechanical Support, and Heart Transplant program until 2016.

Deng has been a longstanding fellow of both the European Society of Cardiology (FESC) since 1998 and the American College of Cardiology (FACC) since 1999. Among his contributions to the field are his expert testimonies at U.S. Centers for Medicare & Medicaid Services (CMS) public hearings regarding mechanical circulatory support therapies (2003) and gene expression profiling in heart transplantation (2007).

== Research ==
Deng's clinical-translational research focuses on investigating the biological and immunological mechanisms involved in the progression of heart failure. His work applies systems biology methodologies to examine potential diagnostic and prognostic indicators in patients with complex cardiovascular conditions.

Deng's work extends beyond cardiology to encompass systems biology and immunology, emphasizing translational research that bridges bench and bedside.

Deng's lab concentrates on patients with advanced heart failure who have limited treatment options beyond optimal medical management. For these individuals, interventions such as long-term mechanical circulatory support, heart transplantation, transcatheter aortic valve replacement, mitral valve repair with MitraClip, high-risk revascularization procedures, and ventricular tachycardia ablation are considered. Deng was responsible for the conduct and publication of the Comparative Outcomes and Clinical Profiles in Transplantation (COCPIT Study) which contributed to the discussion about reorganization of the heart allocation rules in Europe and the United States.

Deng co-developed the first in history diagnostic and prognostic peripheral blood mononuclear cell gene expression profiling biomarker test in heart transplantation medicine that gained US-FDA-regulatory clearance and international evidence-based medicine guideline acceptance to rule out rejection without invasive biopsies

Building on this success, since 2005, the Deng lab started to develop a genomic blood test to better predict outcomes in patients with various forms of advanced heart failure termed MyLeukoMAP, a gene expression test designed to predict survival in advanced heart failure patients, now commercialized through the company LeukoLifeDx, which was acquired by CareDx in 2023.

In 2021, Deng received a $3.5 million NIH grant to lead a five-year, multicenter study investigating whether a single blood test analyzing gene expression in white blood cells can predict long-term outcomes, including long-COVID, in hospitalized COVID-19 patients. This study aims to develop an immune-based precision medicine algorithm to improve clinical decision-making, triage, and resource allocation for high-risk COVID-19 populations, including older adults, people of color, people with comorbidities such as diabetes and obesity and persons with increased social vulnerability.

To create a conceptual practice framework to guide his translational research, Deng collaborates with interdisciplinary teams in the UCLA Schools of Education and Medicine, which addresses communication around treatment preferences and clinical decision-making including end-of-life decisions in high-tech healthcare settings. This work on a framework to personalize high–tech modern medicine encounters is reflected in Deng's research collaboration with Professor Federica Raia (UCLA School of Education & Information Studies and David Geffen School of Medicine) in the "Relational Medicine" project.

== Selected publications ==
- Alraies, MC; Eckman, P (2014). "Adult heart transplant: indications and outcomes". J Thorac Dis. 6 (8): 1120–8. doi:10.3978/j.issn.2072-1439.2014.06.44. PMC 4133547. PMID 25132979.
- Deng, MC; Edwards, LB; Hertz, MI; Rowe, AW; Keck, BM; Kormos, R; Naftel, DC; Kirklin, JK; Taylor, DO (2005). "Mechanical circulatory support device database of the International Society for Heart and Lung Transplantation: third annual report--2005". J Heart Lung Transplant. 24 (9): 1182–7. doi:10.1016/j.healun.2005.07.002. PMID 16143231.
- Chen, Y; Zhang, H; Xiao, X; Jia, Y; Wu, W; Liu, L; Jiang, J; Zhu, B; Meng, X; Chen, W (2013). "Peripheral blood transcriptome sequencing reveals rejection-relevant genes in long-term heart transplantation". Int J Cardiol. 168 (3): 2726–33. doi:10.1016/j.ijcard.2013.03.095. PMID 23602870..
- Deng MC, Elashoff B, Pham MX, Teuteberg JJ, Kfoury AG, Starling RC, Cappola TP, Kao A, Anderson AS, Cotts WG, Ewald GA, Baran DA, Bogaev RC, Shahzad K, Hiller D, Yee J, Valantine HA; for the IMAGE Study Group. Utility of Gene Expression Profiling Score Variability to Predict Clinical Events in Heart Transplant Recipients. Transplantation. 2014 Jan 31. [Epub ahead of print] PMID 24492465 [PubMed - as supplied by publisher]
- Bondar, G; Togashi, R; Cadeiras, M; Schaenman, J; Cheng, RK; Masukawa, L; Hai, J; Bao, TM; Chu, D; Chang, E; Bakir, M; Kupiec-Weglinski, S; Groysberg, V; Grogan, T; Meltzer, J; Kwon, M; Rossetti, M; Elashoff, D; Reed, E; Ping, PP; Deng, MC (2017). "Association between preoperative peripheral blood mononuclear cell gene expression profiles, early postoperative organ function recovery potential and long-term survival in advanced heart failure patients undergoing mechanical circulatory support". PLOS ONE. 12 (12) e0189420. Bibcode:2017PLoSO..1289420B. doi:10.1371/journal.pone.0189420. PMC 5728510. PMID 29236770.
- Raia F, Deng MC. Relational Medicine – Personalizing Modern Healthcare: The Practice of High-Tech Medicine As A RelationalAct. World Scientific Publishing/Imperial College Press, London/Singapore 2014 Deng 2014C
