= Susan E. Eaton =

American writer (born 1964)

- Born: 1964 (age 61–62); United States
- Education: University of Massachusetts Amherst; Harvard Graduate School of Education
- Occupations: Author, journalist, educator, scholar and philanthropic adviser
- Writing career
- Notable work: The Children in Room E4: American Education on Trial

Susan E. Eaton (born 1964) is an American author, journalist, educator, scholar and philanthropic adviser. She is Professor of Practice and Director of the Sillerman Center for the Advancement of Philanthropy at the Heller School for Social Policy at Brandeis University.

== Career ==
She is an adjunct lecturer at the Harvard University Graduate School of Education. Eaton's work has centered around civil rights in education, school desegregation, racial and ethnic diversity and inclusion in K-12 schools and immigration-related practice and policy at the state and local levels.

She is the author of the books Integration Nation: Immigrants, Refugees and America at its Best, The Children in Room E4: American Education on Trial; The Other Boston Busing Story; and with Gary Orfield, co-author of Dismantling Desegregation: The Quiet Reversal of Brown v. Board of Education.

Eaton founded and co-directed the storytelling project One Nation Indivisible, ("Our Staff") from which the book Integration Nation grew. Her writing has also appeared in The Nation, The New York Times and other publications.

From 2006 to 2015, Eaton was the research director at the Charles Hamilton Houston Institute for Race and Justice at Harvard Law School.

Integration Nation is the WSU Common Reading for the 2016–17 academic year.

== Books ==
- Dismantling Desegregation: The Quiet Reversal of Brown V. Board of Education. New York: New Press, 1996 ISBN 9781565843059
- The Other Boston Busing Story: What's Won and Lost Across the Boundary Line. New Haven: Yale University Press, 2001. ISBN 9780300087659
- The Children in Room E4: American Education on Trial. Chapel Hill, N.C: Algonquin Books of Chapel Hill, 2007. ISBN 9781565124882
- Integration Nation: Immigrants, Refugees, and America at Its Best. The New Press, 2016, p. 192. ISBN 9781620970959.
