= Christopher Edley Jr. =

American legal scholar (1953–2024)

Chris Edley
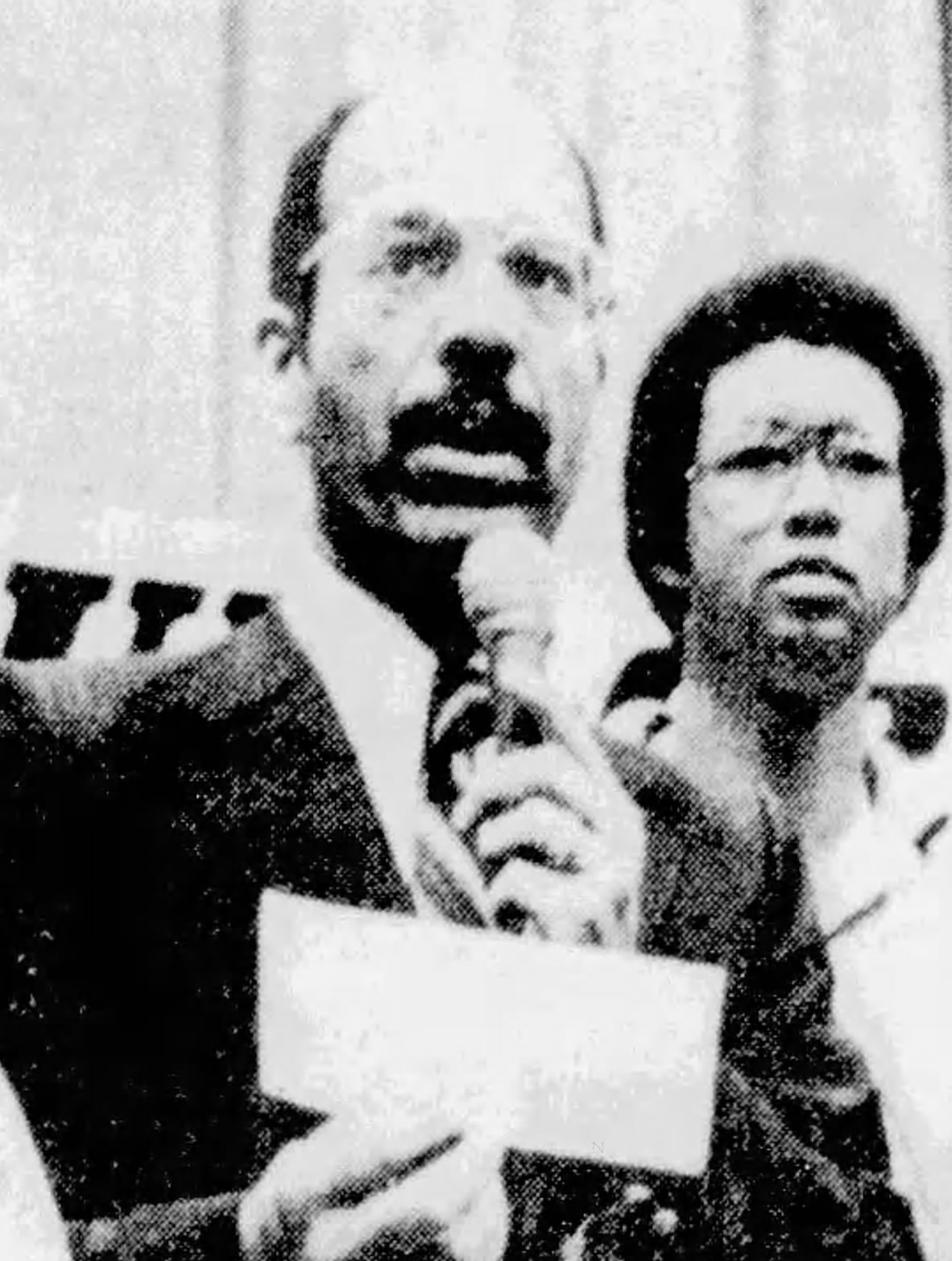
- Edley (center) and Arthur Ashe in 1977

Dean of the University of California, Berkeley School of Law
- In office 2004–2013
- Preceded by: Bob Berring (acting)
- Succeeded by: Gillian Lester (acting)

Personal details
- Born: Christopher Fairfield Edley Jr. January 13, 1953 Boston, Massachusetts, U.S.
- Died: May 10, 2024 (aged 71) Stanford, California, U.S.
- Party: Democratic
- Spouse: Maria Echaveste
- Education: Swarthmore College (BA); Harvard University (JD, MPP)

Christopher Fairfield Edley Jr. (January 13, 1953 – May 10, 2024) was an American lawyer and the Dean of the University of California, Berkeley School of Law from 2004 to 2013. He served as President of The Opportunity Institute, an organization he co-founded with Ann O'Leary in 2016.

== Early life ==
Edley was born on January 13, 1953, to Christopher F. Edley Sr., President of the United Negro College Fund, and Zaida Coles Edley, an actress and speech therapist. He was raised in Philadelphia, Pennsylvania, and New Rochelle, New York.

Edley completed his undergraduate studies in mathematics at Swarthmore College, later serving on its Board of Managers, a position which his father had also held. Edley next attended Harvard Law School, earning a J.D. and a M.P.P.

== Career ==
Edlay became a professor of administrative law. Working with Gary Orfield, Edley founded the Harvard Civil Rights Project. Edley was a leading figure in Democratic policy circles for four decades, serving as a senior member of five presidential campaigns, as an economic policy and budget official under Presidents Jimmy Carter and Bill Clinton, and as a chair of the Obama-Biden transition team. In 2011, he was appointed by U.S. Secretary of Education Arne Duncan as co-chair of the congressionally chartered National Commission on Equity and Excellence in Education.

Edley served as an advisor to President Clinton's One America Initiative, was a member of the United States Commission on Civil Rights, and chaired President Clinton's 1998 Affirmative Action Review. In the 2008 presidential election, he supported and advised candidate Barack Obama, one of his former students at Harvard Law School.

Having served since 2004, Edley resigned as Dean of the UC Berkeley School of Law at the end of 2013 to undergo treatment for prostate cancer. In 2016, he returned to teaching law at Berkeley and served as interim dean of the UC Berkeley School of Education between 2021 and 2023.

According to legal journalist Emily Bazelon, Edley "has written thoughtfully and moderately about affirmative action."

== Personal life and death ==
Following two divorces, Edley married Maria Echaveste, the former deputy chief of staff for U.S. President Bill Clinton. He died from complications of surgery in Stanford, California, on May 10, 2024, aged 71.

== Published works ==
- Edley, Christopher, Jr. (1998). Not All Black and White: Affirmative Action and American Values. Farrar, Straus and Giroux. ISBN 0-374-52541-2.
- Edley, Christopher, Jr. (1990). Administrative Law: Rethinking Judicial Control of Bureaucracy. Yale University Press. ISBN 978-0300040791.
