= The Children in Room E4 =

2007 American non-fiction book by Susan Eaton

The Children in Room E4: American Education on Trial
- Author: Susan E. Eaton
- Language: English
- Genre: Non-fiction
- Published: 2007
- Publisher: Algonquin Books of Chapel Hill
- Publication place: United States
- Pages: 395
- OCLC: 183353201
- Dewey Decimal: 371.82900974/63
- LC Class: LC212.23.H3 E18 2007

The Children in Room E4: American Education on Trial is a 2007 American non-fiction book written by Susan Eaton.

The Children in Room E4 provides interwoven narratives of the lives and educations of students in Room E4 of Simpson-Waverly Elementary School in Hartford, Connecticut and of a successful landmark civil rights case, Sheff v. O'Neill, that argued that Latino and black children were being denied an equal education because of the segregation of the state's public schools.
