= Bob Berring =

American lawyer

Robert C. Berring Jr.
- Born: November 20, 1949 (age 76); Canton, Ohio, U.S.
- Education: Harvard University; UC Berkeley School of Law
- Occupations: Walter Perry Johnson Professor of Law, UC Berkeley School of Law
- Office: Interim Dean of UC Berkeley School of Law
- Predecessor: John P. Dwyer
- Successor: Christopher Edley Jr.

Robert Charles "Bob" Berring Jr. (born November 20, 1949) is a noted figure in law, as a professor, librarian, scholar and researcher.

== Biography ==
Born in 1949 in Canton, Ohio, Berring received his undergraduate degree from Harvard (1971), his J.D. degree from University of California, Berkeley School of Law (1974), and his library degree from U.C. Berkeley's then-named library school.

Since 1982, Berring (a University of California, Berkeley School of Law graduate) has been a Professor of Law and Law Librarian there. He currently holds the Walter Perry Johnson Professor of Law Chair appointment.

From 1986 to 1989, he held a joint appointment as dean of the School of Library and Information Studies. He also served as interim dean of the law school from January 2003 to June 2004.

Berring has written numerous works. Recent publications include Finding the Law (with Beth Edinger, 11th ed., 1999) and Legal Research Survival Manual, (with Edinger, 2002). He also created the award-winning video series Legal Research for the 21st Century.

== Personal life ==
Berring is married, has two children, and lives in Berkeley, California.

Berring writes an advice column under the pseudonym "Uncle Zeb." Uncle Zeb claims to be an "ectoplasmic entity" and his comments are often irreverent and humorous in tone. Many of Uncle Zeb's writings have been compiled in The Green Bag. The law school's cafe, Cafe Zeb, was named after Uncle Zeb by popular vote.

== Recognition ==
Berring has won significant recognition for teaching and law librarianship. He was awarded the University of California, Berkeley's Distinguished Teaching Award in 1987. Berring received the Frederick Charles Hicks Award from the American Association of Law Libraries (AALL) for contributions to law librarianship in 2003. The AALL also recognized him as the most influential author in law librarianship with the Centennial Award for having most significant contribution to law librarianship from 1957 to 2006.
