= Eva L. Baker =

American academic

Eva L. Baker is a distinguished professor currently at the University of California, Los Angeles, the former acting dean of the Graduate School of Education & Information Studies and current director of the National Center for Research on Evaluation, Standards, and Student Testing.

== Education ==
Baker enrolled at the University of California, Los Angeles at 18 years old and subsequently completed her B.A., M.A., and Ed.D. degrees at the university. Soon thereafter, she accepted an assistant professor position.

== Accomplishments ==
In 2007, she served as the American Educational Research Association president, a member of the U.S. Department of Education Advisory Council on Education Statistics, the Independent Review Panel on Title I, and was the measurement expert in the federal process of rule making for educational policy, and as a member of the National Academy of Education (NAEd) became the recipient of the Henry Chauncey Award for Distinguished Service to Assessment and Educational Science by Educational Testing Service.
