= Joan Herman =

Director of University of California

Joan L. Herman is the Director of University of California, Los Angeles's National Center for Research on Evaluation, Standards, and Student Testing (CRESST). With experience as an evaluator of school reform, she has researched the effects of testing on schools and the design of assessment systems to support school planning and instructional improvement. Her recent work has focused on the validity and utility of teachers' formative assessment practices in science.

A former teacher and school board member, Dr. Herman has authored a number of resource books for educators and researchers, the most notable being Tracking Your School's Success: A Guide to Sensible School-Based Evaluation and A Practical Guide to Alternative Assessment. In addition to publishing in research journals and books, she frequently speaks on evaluation and assessment topics to policy audiences. Currently, Dr. Herman is the editor of the academic quarterly, Educational Assessment.

== Past and current associations ==
- California Educational Research Association (CERA) - President, 1991;
- American Educational Research Association (AERA) - Program Chair, 2003
- National Academy's Committee on the Design of Science Assessment
- National Organization of Research Centers
- Knowledge Alliance - Co-Chair
