= Gary Orfield =

Scholar in the United States

- Born: September 5, 1941
- Spouse: Patricia Gándara

Academic background
- Education: University of Minnesota (BA); University of Chicago (MA), University of Chicago, Ph.D.

Gary Orfield (born September 5, 1941) is an American professor of education, law, political science and urban planning at the UCLA Graduate School of Education and Information Studies. He worked previously at the Harvard Graduate School of Education. A native Minnesotan, Orfield received his Ph.D. from the University of Chicago and travels annually to Latin America.

== Early life and education ==
Orfield was born in Minnesota, the son of Myron and Lindy Orfield. He graduated from the University of Minnesota, was a graduate student at the University of Chicago, where he received both an MA and a Ph.D.

== Career ==
Orfield is interested in the study of civil rights, education policy, urban policy, and minority opportunity. In 1996, he co-founded, with Chris Edley, the Harvard Civil Rights Project, now called The Civil Rights Project/Proyecto Derechos Civiles at UCLA. He founded the project to provide needed intellectual capital to academics, policy makers and civil rights advocates on multiracial civil rights issues. He was professor of education and social policy at the Harvard Graduate School of Education for 16 years.

In addition to many studies of desegregation, Orfield is an author or editor of many books and reports including: Dropouts in America, Lessons in Integration, Higher Education and the Color Line, and spoken out for affirmative action and against standardized testing, and particularly the use of test scores to deny high school graduation in the book, Raising Standards or Raising Barriers.

Orfield's central interest is the development and implementation of social policy, with a focus on the impact of policy on equal opportunity for success in American society. Recent works include studies of changing patterns of school desegregation and the impact of diversity on the educational experiences of law students.

In addition to his scholarly work, Orfield has been involved with development of governmental policy. He participated as a court-appointed expert in several dozen civil rights cases, including Grutter v. Bollinger, the University of Michigan Supreme Court case that upheld the policy of affirmative action in 2003. He has been called to give testimony in civil rights suits by the U.S. Department of Justice and many civil rights, legal services, and educational organizations.

From 2015 to 2016, Orfield served as the Wayne Morse Chair of Law and Politics, established in honor of the late former Senator, at the University of Oregon.

== Personal life ==
Orfield has three daughters with his first wife, Antonia Orfield. Since 2006 he has been married to Patricia Gándara, co-director of the Civil Rights Project. He is the older brother of Myron Orfield, a legal scholar at the University of Minnesota Law School.

== Awards ==
In 1997, Orfield was awarded the American Political Science Association's Charles Merriam Award for his "contribution to the art of government through the application of social science research." In 2007, he was also awarded the Social Justice in Education Award by the American Educational Research Association for "work which has had a profound impact on demonstrating the critical role of education research in supporting social justice."

== Selected Bibliography ==
- Orfield, Gary; Franklin Monfort (1992). Status of School Desegregation: The Next Generation. Alexandria, VA: National School Boards Association. ISBN 978-0-88364-174-3.
- Sunderman, Gail L.; Kim, James S.; Orfield, Gary (2005). NCLB meets school realities: lessons from the field. Corwin Press. p. 10. ISBN 1-4129-1555-4.
- Lee, Chungmei; Orfield, Gary (2005). "Why Segregation Matters: Poverty and Educational Inequality". The Civil Rights Project. Harvard University: 1–47.
- Losen, Daniel J.; Orfield, Gary, eds. (2002). Racial inequity in special education. Civil Rights Project at Harvard University. Cambridge, MA: Harvard Education Press. ISBN 1-891792-05-9. OCLC 51526741.
- Orfield, Gary; Eaton, Susan E. (1996). Dismantling Desegregation: The Quiet Reversal of Brown v. Board of Education. Harvard Project on School Desegregation. New York: The New Press.
- Orfield, Gary; Frankenberg, Erica (2013). Educational Delusions? : Why Choice Can Deepen Inequality and How to Make Schools Fair. University of California Press. p. 118. ISBN 978-0-520-27474-7. JSTOR 10.1525/j.ctt24hsqs.
- Orfield, Gary (2006). Dropouts In America, Confronting The Graduation Rate Crisis. Harvard Educational Pub Group. OCLC 57253457.
- Orfield, Gary (May 16, 2015). "BROWN AT 62: SCHOOL SEGREGATION BY RACE, POVERTY AND STATE" (PDF). Civil Rights Project-Proyecto Derechos Civiles.
- Orfield, Gary (November 2017). "New Jersey's Segregated Schools Trends and Paths Forward" (PDF). Civil Rights Project.
- Orfield, Gary (April 7, 2005). "School Desegregation in the United States". African American Studies Center. Oxford University Press. doi:10.1093/acref/9780195301731.013.43287. ISBN 978-0-19-530173-1.
- Orfield, Gary; Frankenberg, Erica; Associates (2013). Orfield, Gary; Frankenberg, Erica (eds.). Educational delusions?: Why choice can deepen inequality and how to make schools fair. Univ of California Press. ISBN 978-0-520-27474-7. JSTOR 10.1525/j.ctt24hsqs.
- Orfield, Gary (1964). A Study of the Termination Policy. Denver, Colorado: National Congress of American Indians. p. 6.
- Orfield, Gary; John Kucsera; Genevieve Siegel-Hawley (September 2012). "E Pluribus...Separation: Deepening Double Segregation for More Students" (PDF). The Civil Rights Project.
- Orfield, Gary (2001). "Schools More Separate: Consequences of a Decade of Resegregation" (PDF). Harvard Civil Rights Project.
