= Higher Education Research Institute =

Center at University of California, Los Angeles

The Higher Education Research Institute (HERI) serves as an interdisciplinary center for research, evaluation, information, policy studies, and research training in post-secondary education. HERI is housed in the UCLA Graduate School of Education and Information Studies (GSE&IS) at the University of California, Los Angeles. The Institute's research program covers a variety of topics including the outcomes of post-secondary education, leadership development, institutional transformation, faculty performance, federal and state policy, and educational equity.

== Data ==
HERI provides a wealth of higher education research information. The data is freely available, but recent data is only accessible by applying for specific dataset based on research needs. Data which is over 10 years is archived and freely available on the website.

The available information comes primarily from the Cooperative Institutional Research Program (CIRP). CIRP is the largest and oldest empirical study of higher education in the United States. The CIRP data comes from three main surveys, one for incoming freshmen, another given after the completion of the first year, and a final exit survey for graduating seniors. The data covered by these surveys ranges from basic demographics to the political views of students.
