= The Civil Rights Project/Proyecto Derechos Civiles =

Research and policy think tank focused on racial justice

The Civil Rights Project/ El Proyecto de CRP, originally named The Civil Rights Project, is a multidisciplinary research and policy think tank focused on issues of racial justice. In January 2007, The Civil Rights Project moved from Harvard University to the Graduate School of Education and Information Studies at UCLA.

== Mission ==
Its mission is to help renew the civil rights movement by:

- Bridging the worlds of ideas and action
- Becoming a preeminent source of intellectual capital and
- Becoming a forum for building consensus within that movement.

== Founders ==
It was founded by Christopher Edley, Jr. (formerly of Harvard Law School, now Dean of Boalt Hall Law School at UC Berkeley) and Gary Orfield (formerly of Harvard Graduate School of Education, now Professor of Education at UCLA's Graduate School of Education and Information Studies) in 1996 to provide needed intellectual capital to academics, policy makers and civil rights advocates.

== School segregation studies ==
The Project has published a series of monographs on school segregation in various states. These studies are frequently cited in national publications with comparative statistics by state.

The Project uses a key metric: "percentage of black students in majority black schools." Any percentage above zero indicates a concentration of blacks in a relatively small number of schools. A corollary measure is "percentage of black students in majority white schools." The Project defines intensely segregated as schools that have less than ten percent white enrollment.

== See also ==
- Teaching for social justice

== Notes ==
1. "Faculty profile of Christopher Edley, Jr". August 19, 2005. Archived from the original on September 1, 2006.
2. "CRP moves to UCLA article". Archived from the original on March 5, 2007.
3. "The Civil Rights Project Mission Statement". August 19, 2005. Archived from the original on October 1, 2005.
4. "The Civil Rights Project Mission Statement third paragraph". August 19, 2005. Archived from the original on October 1, 2005.
