= UCLA School of Education and Information Studies =

Graduate professional school of the University of California, Los Angeles

- Former names: Graduate School of Education and Information Studies (1994–2020) Department of Education: California State Normal School in Los Angeles (1881–1914), Los Angeles State Normal School (1914–1919), Teachers College (1919–1939), School of Education (1939–1994) Department of Information Studies: School of Library Service (1958–1973), School of Library and Information Science (1973–1994)
- Type: Public
- Established: 1881 as the California State Normal School in Los Angeles; 1919 incorporated into the University of California
- Parent institution: University of California, Los Angeles
- Endowment: $4.7 million
- Dean: Christina A. Christie
- Faculty: ~100
- Students: ~1,000
- Location: Los Angeles, California, United States; 34.07259°N 118.43928°W
- Campus: Urban
- Nicknames: UCLA Ed & IS
- Website: www.seis.ucla.edu

The UCLA School of Education and Information Studies (UCLA Ed & IS) is one of the academic and professional schools at the University of California, Los Angeles. Located in Los Angeles, California, the school combines two departments. Established in 1881, the school is the oldest unit at UCLA, having been founded as a normal school prior to the establishment of the university. It was incorporated into the University of California in 1919.

The school offers doctoral and master's degrees, including the MA, MEd, MLIS, EdD, and PhD, as well as professional certificates and credentials in education and information studies. It also hosts visiting scholars and a number of research centers, institutes, and programs. Ed&IS recently initiated an undergraduate major in Education & Social Transformation in addition to the minor that it has offered in Education Studies.

Each class in the two-year MLIS and MA programs in information studies has approximately 80 students, while each class in the one-year MEd and MA programs in education has approximately 250 students.

Since 1994, the name of the school has been the UCLA Graduate School of Education and Information Studies (GSE&IS). In 2020, it was changed to UCLA School of Education and Information Studies (Ed & IS) to reflect its provision of undergraduate courses as well as post-graduate.

== Location ==
Ed & IS is located in three buildings on the UCLA campus in Westwood, Los Angeles. Moore Hall primarily houses the school's administration and education faculty. Built in 1930 and designed by George W. Kelham, Moore Hall is among the most architecturally significant buildings at UCLA, an example of the school's original Romanesque Revival style. During the campus' expansion during the 1950s, the modernist architect Kemper Nomland refurbished Moore Hall. The building was again refurbished by the Los Angeles-based architectural firm Robert Englekirk & Associates in 1993. Moore Hall is located directly south of Powell Library, adjacent to Bruin Walk, Kerkhoff Hall and Ackerman Union, in the middle of campus.

The Mathematical Sciences Building houses some of the school's research centers, programs, and institutes, in addition to the administrative and faculty offices of the Mathematical Sciences. The building was built in 1957 and designed by Stanton & Stockwell in the mid-century modernist style. The Mathematical Sciences Building is located in the middle of campus, directly south of Moore Hall, at the north-west corner of the Court of Sciences. The GSEIS Building primarily houses the information studies faculty and computer and research labs. Built in 1991, the building is located in the northern part of the UCLA campus, off Sunset Boulevard, directly adjacent to the Charles E. Young Research Library, UCLA's main research library.

== History ==
The UCLA School of Education and Information Studies can trace its history back to a state legislative act in 1881 that established a "southern branch" of the California State Normal School in Los Angeles. When it opened in 1882 (on what is now the site of the Central Library of the Los Angeles Public Library system), its primary responsibility was teacher training. The Department of Education was established in 1894. The school was renamed the Los Angeles State Normal School in 1914, and in 1917 the school was moved to a larger site on Vermont Avenue (on what is now the site of Los Angeles City College). The new facility included an elementary school where teachers-in-training could practice their teaching technique on children. That same year Ernest Carroll Moore (for whom Moore Hall is named) was appointed its director. The University of California opened its southern branch in 1919 by replacing the Los Angeles State Normal School with the University's Teachers College. A southern branch of the College of Letters and Science, which enrolled considerably fewer students than the Teachers College, was also established as part of the campus. Moore became director of the southern campus (later provost) and dean of the Teachers College, a position he held until 1939. The campus moved to its current location in Westwood, Los Angeles in 1929.

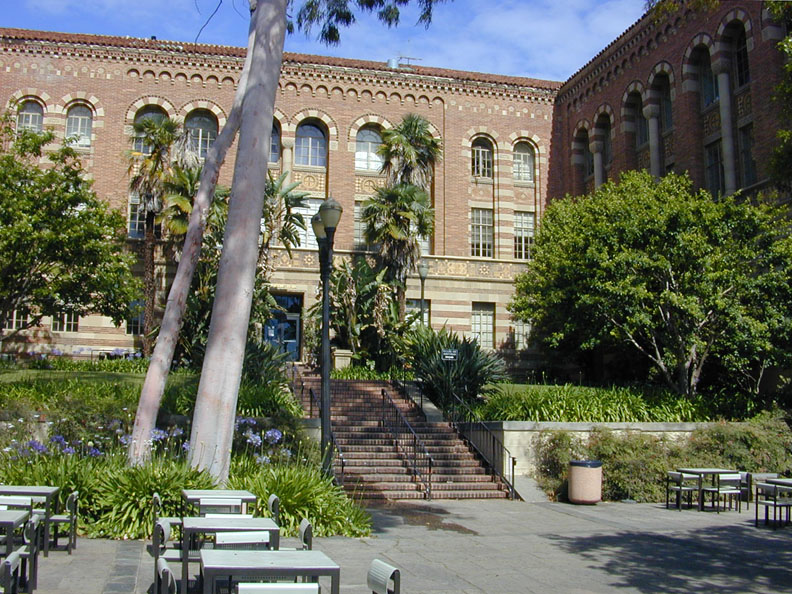
Moore Hall west side entrance

In 1930 Los Angeles City Librarian Everett R. Perry proposed to the president of the University of California the establishment of a library school on the Los Angeles campus of the University. By 1935 the School of Librarianship was opened at the University's campus at Berkeley (now the UC Berkeley School of Information), which was later suspended through World War II. UCLA University Librarian Lawrence Clark Powell, among other Los Angeles leaders, resumed the prewar interest in a library school at UCLA. The Regents of the University of California approved the establishment of the school in 1958. Powell (for whom Powell Library is named) resigned his position as University Librarian to become dean of the new school. The school was established with collaboration from the School of Librarianship at Berkeley. The two schools initially created a single alumni association and doctoral students took courses, when appropriate, at either campus. From its inception the school hired faculty from other disciplines, namely mathematician Robert M. Hayes. With innovation in information technology after World War II, library programs became increasingly multidisciplinary, effectively providing a disciplinary home for the interdisciplinary study of information science. Many library schools have since been repositioned as information schools, schools of information science, or schools of library and information science. See the history of information science.

The School of Education and the School of Library and Information Science were incorporated into the Graduate School of Education and Information Studies in 1994. The merger took place one year after UCLA had originally proposed eliminating the Graduate School of Library and Information Science. UCLA is the only major research university in the country that combines these two areas of study into a single school or college.

On January 29, 2014, Dean Marcelo Suárez-Orozco became the inaugural Wasserman Dean of Education & Information Studies. Suárez-Orozco left UCLA to become Chancellor at the University of Massachusetts, Boston and was replaced by Christina A. Christie as the new Wasserman Dean of Education & Information Studies in 2020.

== Departments ==
=== Department of Education ===
The Department of Education is ranked within the top ten graduate schools of education by U.S. News & World Report, and currently ranked 3rd in the nation. The Department of Education is UCLA's oldest unit, since UCLA was founded as a normal school for the training of teachers. Divisions within the Department of Education include Urban Schooling, Student Affairs, Educational Leadership, Higher Education and Organizational Change, Human Development and Psychology (formerly Psychological Studies in Education), Social Research Methodology, Social Sciences and Comparative Education, among others. The program offers an undergraduate major in Education & Social Transformation, an undergraduate minor in Education Studies, a Master's (awarded after one year of study) and PhD program. The department is known for its research in the study of student testing and assessment, teacher and continuing education and development - particularly in urban, multi-ethnic environments, early childhood development, and issues of access, equity and quality facing higher education. The department is home to National Center for Research on Evaluation, Standards, and Student Testing (CRESST), the Higher Education Research Institute (HERI), The Civil Rights Project/Proyecto Derechos Civiles (CRP/PDC), the UC All Campus Consortium On Research and Diversity (UC ACCORD), and the Center for International and Development Education (CIDE), among others.

=== Department of Information Studies ===
Accredited by the American Library Association and a founding member of the I-Schools caucus, the Department of Information Studies ranks the 4th most productive and 3rd most highly cited faculty in the latest Budd survey of "Scholarly Productivity of U.S. LIS Faculty" (as measured per capita of faculty). U.S. News & World Report ranks the Master's of Library Science program among the top 13 in the country.

The department offers an undergraduate program in Information Studies; the Master's in Library and Information Science (awarded after two years of study), which has three focus areas: Library Studies, Archival Studies, and Informatics; the PhD in Information Studies; and the Moving Image Archive Studies MA, an inter-departmental program jointly sponsored by the UCLA Film and Television Archive, and the Department of Film, Television and Digital Media in the UCLA School of Theater, Film and Television. The department is home to the California Center for the Book, a division of the Center for the Book, the Center for Information as Evidence, and the California Rare Book School, among many other institutes, programs, and research centers.

== UCLA Lab School ==
The UCLA Lab School, a quasi-private, quasi-public-school, has been on the UCLA campus since 1947 and currently has 450 students ranging in ages 4–12. Ed&IS's Department of Education is the only department in the United States that enjoys direct access to an on-campus elementary school. The Lab School classrooms provide an experiential education by serving as laboratories for exploring ideas about teaching, learning, and child development. The school is located on the northern part of the UCLA campus, directly north of the UCLA Anderson School of Management, off Sunset Boulevard. The school has also opened satellite campuses in South Los Angeles, where educators can try to address the educational challenges posed by poverty, lack of English fluency and achievement gaps on the part of racial and ethnic minorities.

== UCLA Community School (UCLA-CS) ==
UCLA-CS is located at the former Ambassador Hotel site in Mid-Wilshire district of Los Angeles. The school, a part of the Robert F. Kennedy Community Schools, opened its doors in September 2010 to students in grades K-12.

== Journals ==
=== InterActions ===
The school's journal is InterActions: UCLA Journal of Education and Information Studies. The journal is "a peer-reviewed on-line journal committed to the promotion of interdisciplinary and critical scholarship. Edited by students in the UCLA School of Education and Information Studies, the journal brings together senior and emerging scholars, activists, and professionals whose work covers a broad range of theory and practice." The journal is an open access journal housed by the Berkeley Electronic Press and the eScholarship initiative of the California Digital Library.

=== Freire Online Journal ===
The school also houses the Freire Online Journal, which publishes "Freirean academic, in the field, experimental, and research-based works."

== Current degree programs ==
Doctorate degrees

- Educational Leadership Program (EdD)
- Higher Education and Organizational Change (PhD)
- Human Development and Psychology (PhD)
- Information Studies (PhD)
- Joint Special Education Program with Cal State Los Angeles (PhD)
- Social Research Methodology (PhD)
- Social Sciences & Comparative Education (PhD)
- Urban Schooling (PhD)

Master's degree

- Higher Education and Organizational Change (MA)
- Human Development and Psychology (MA)
- Library and Information Science (MLIS)
- Principal Leadership Institute (MEd)
- Social Research Methodology (MA)
- Social Sciences & Comparative Education (MA)
- Student Affairs (MEd)
- Teacher Education Program (MEd)
- Transformative Coaching and Leadership (MEd)

Bachelor's degree

- Education and Social Transformation (BA)

== Centers ==
- Center for Critical Internet Inquiry (c2i2)
- Center for Critical Race Studies in Education (CCRSE)
- Center for Information as Evidence
- Center for International & Development Education (CIDE)
- Center for Knowledge Infrastructures
- Center for Transformation of Schools
- Center X
- The Civil Rights Project/Proyecto Derechos Civiles
- CONNECT, A Center for Research and Innovation in Elementary Education
- National Center for Research on Evaluation, Standards, and Student Testing (CRESST)
- Pritzker Center for Strengthening Children and Families
- UCLA Center for Community Schooling
- UCLA Center for Dyslexia, Diverse Learners and Social Justice

=== Center X ===
Center X is a coalition of professional credentialing and continuing education programs housed within the UCLA Graduate School of Education and Information Studies. In the past ten years, Center X has awarded the preliminary teaching credential and Master of Education to more than 1700 teachers through its Teacher Education Program (TEP) and the Tier I administrative credential and Master of Education to nearly 400 administrators in training through its Principal Leadership Institute (PLI). Center X was founded in response to a report published by the University of California's Advisory Committee calling for a transformation of the relationship between university teacher training programs and the public schools to employ prospective student teachers. In response to this report and the social upheaval in Los Angeles of the early 1990s, the newly formed center explicitly focused on some of the most impoverished areas in Los Angeles: East Los Angeles, Pico Union, South Los Angeles, and the Crenshaw District. Both of Center X's flagship professional programs, TEP and PLI, have a social justice emphasis as core to their work.

Center X works to staff schools that are underserved, in communities of color, low-income, and with students that have academic needs. Schools that employ TEP Candidates have seen success, particularly in the area of teacher retention. A 2003 study found that "Center X graduates stay in teaching at higher rates than national averages. As expected, retention decreases over time, yet even after 5 years, 70% of Center X graduates remain in the classroom compared to 61% of teachers nationally". For the 2010-2011 academic year, four TEP alumni were selected as United States Department of Education "Teaching Ambassador Fellows".

Center X is committed to Vygotskyian sociocultural theory and continues to do work around child development through language.

Center X provides ongoing development for urban educators and schools through eight projects. These include five subject matter Projects (Writing, Reading and Literature, Mathematics, Science, and History-Geography), the UCLA Parent Project, a National Boards Project, and a School Transformation Project.

== Institutes ==
- Black Male Institute (BMI)
- Higher Education Research Institute (HERI)
- Institute for Democracy, Education, & Access (IDEA)
- Institute for Immigration, Globalization and Education
- Paulo Freire Institute
- Sudikoff Family Institute

== Programs ==
- California Rare Book School
- Teaching to Change LA
- International Research on Permanent Authentic Records in Electronic Systems (InterPARES)
- REFORMA Los Angeles Chapter (The National Association to Promote Library and Information Services to Latinos and the Spanish Speaking)

== Notable faculty ==
- Alexander Astin
- Alison Bailey
- Eva L. Baker
- Marcia J. Bates
- Christine L. Borgman
- Li Cai
- Michelle Caswell
- Mitchell Chang
- Johanna Drucker
- Anne J. Gilliland
- Sandra Graham
- Sandra Harding
- Robert M. Hayes
- Connie Kasari
- Douglas Kellner
- Seymour Lubetzky
- Jane Margolis
- Safiya Noble
- Mike Rose
- Val D. Rust
- Ramesh Srinivasan
- Carlos Alberto Torres
- Maryanne Wolf

== Endowed chairs ==
- Allan Murray Cartter Chair in Higher Education (Walter R. Allen)
- George F. Kneller Chair in Education & Anthropology (Teresa McCarty)
- George F. Kneller Chair in Education & Philosophy (Christine L. Borgman)
- Martin and Bernard Breslauer Professorship in Bibliography
- Presidential Chair in Education and Diversity (Sandra Graham)
- Pritzker Family Endowed Chair in Education to Strengthen Families (Tyrone Howard)
- The Wasserman Endowed Deanship of Education & Information Studies (Christine Christie)
