= National Center for Research on Evaluation, Standards, and Student Testing =

Independent research institute

- CRESST Logo
- Formation: 1966
- Directors: Li Cai, Ph.D. Eva L. Baker, Ed.D (Founding Director); Joan L. Herman, Ed.D (Director Emeritus)
- Website: http://www.cresst.org

The National Center for Research on Evaluation, Standards, and Student Testing (CRESST) is a research partnership consisting of UCLA, the University of Colorado, Stanford University, RAND, the University of Pittsburgh, the University of Southern California, Educational Testing Service, and the University of Cambridge, United Kingdom.

For 50 years, the mission focus of the UCLA Center for the Study of Evaluation (CSE) and, more recently, CRESST has been the assessment of educational quality, addressing persistent problems in the design and use of assessment systems to serve multiple purposes.

== History ==
=== CSE ===
CSE was established in 1966 when it was first designated the national center for research in educational evaluation as a result of a national competition. This charge was most recently renewed in 1996 when CSE successfully competed for the National Center for Research on Evaluation, Standards, and Student Testing (CRESST), receiving a five-year, $13.5 million grant from the U.S. Department of Education’s Office of Educational Research and Improvement (OERI). In addition to conducting research based on this core funding, CSE contracts with a wide variety of clients in the public and private sectors, including states, local school districts, foundations, and corporations. The organization’s success is documented in the demand for its research and development services: CSE’s annual budget from all sources totals over $7 million.

=== CRESST ===
Funded by the U.S. Department of Education’s Office of Educational Research and Improvement (OERI), CRESST is a partnership of UCLA’s Graduate School of Education & Information Studies and its Center for the Study of Evaluation. CRESST's focus is on the assessment of educational quality, addressing persistent problems in the design and use of assessment systems to serve multiple purposes.

== Location ==
CSE/CRESST is located on the UCLA campus in Los Angeles, CA, as part of the Graduate School of Education & Information Studies.

== Staff ==
=== Directors ===
- Li Cai
- Eva L. Baker (Founding Director)
- Joan L. Herman (Emeritus Director)

=== Senior Researchers ===
- Kilchan Choi
- Greg Chung
- Noelle Griffin
- Mark Hansen
- Markus Iseli
- Alan Koenig
- John Lee
- Ayesha Madni
- Christine Ong
- Julia Phelan
- Jia Wang
- Bill Bewley
