= Rebecca Zwick =

Researcher in educational assessment and psychometrics

Academic background
- Education: Rutgers University; University of California, Berkeley; University of North Carolina at Chapel Hill

Academic work
- Discipline: Statistics
- Sub-discipline: psychometrics
- Institutions: University of California, Santa Barbara
- Main interests: Educational assessment
- Notable works: Who Gets In? Strategies for Fair and Effective College Admissions (2017)

Rebecca Zwick is an American statistician and researcher in educational assessment and psychometrics. She is a professor emeritus in the Gevirtz Graduate School of Education at the University of California, Santa Barbara and the author of a book on university and college admission, Who Gets In? Strategies for Fair and Effective College Admissions (Harvard University Press, 2017).

== Education and career ==
Zwick earned a master's degree in statistics from Rutgers University, and completed a Ph.D. in quantitative methods in education from the University of California, Berkeley.

After postdoctoral studies at the University of North Carolina at Chapel Hill and twelve years with the Educational Testing Service, she joined the UC Santa Barbara faculty in 1996. She retired in 2010, and returned to the Educational Testing Service as a Distinguished Presidential Appointee.

== Book ==
Zwick is in favor of the use of affirmative action to balance the gender and racial composition of colleges, and her book Who Gets In? shows that the use of standardized test scores in college admissions can have a similar effect: according to her book, simulated admission results based only on grades, without the use of standardized test scores, would admit many more women than men, and admit a larger number of Asian-American students in preference to students from other minorities. As her book describes, the use of standardized tests tends to counter these effects.

== Recognition ==
In 2012, Zwick was elected as a Fellow of the American Statistical Association. In 2024, she won the Robert L. Linn Distinguished Address Award for contributions to measurement and assessment policy from the American Educational Research Association.
