= Li Cai =

Psychometrician

- 蔡力
- Born: c. 1980 (age 45–46); Nanjing, Jiangsu, China
- Education: Nanjing University; Ohio State University; University of North Carolina
- Known for: Invention and proof of correctness of a solution for latent variable models that were considered intractable
- Awards: AERA Outstanding Quantitative Dissertation (2009); NCME Brenda H. Loyd Award (2009); APA Anne Anastasi Distinguished Early Career Award (2011); SMEP Cattell Award (2012); NSF PECASE (2012); FABBS Early Career Impact Award (2015)
- Scientific career
- Fields: Statistics; Psychometrics
- Workplaces: UCLA; CRESST
- Thesis: A Metropolis–Hastings Robbins–Monro algorithm for maximum likelihood nonlinear latent structure analysis with a comprehensive measurement model
- Doctoral advisor: David Thissen

Li Cai (Chinese: 蔡力; pinyin: Cài Lì; born c. 1980) is an American statistician and quantitative psychologist. He is a professor of Advanced Quantitative Methodology at the UCLA Graduate School of Education and Information Studies with a joint appointment in the quantitative area of the UCLA Department of Psychology. He is also Director of the National Center for Research on Evaluation, Standards, and Student Testing, Managing Partner at Vector Psychometric Group.

He invented the Metropolis–Hastings Robbins–Monro algorithm for inference in high-dimensional latent variable models that had been intractable with existing solutions. The algorithm was recognized as a mathematically rigorous breakthrough in the "curse of dimensionality" and garnered numerous top-tier publications and national awards.

== Career ==
A native of Nanjing, China and alumnus of the Nanjing Foreign Language School, Cai earned a bachelor's degree with distinction from Nanjing University in 2001. He completed his undergraduate studies in three years and, in that time, also won multiple international competitions for public speaking. After earning a master's degree in journalism at Ohio State University in 2003, he moved to the University of North Carolina at Chapel Hill, earning a second master's in mathematical statistics in 2006 and PhD in quantitative psychology in 2008.

He joined the psychology and education faculty at the University of California, Los Angeles in 2008 and was awarded tenure in 2011. He was appointed a full professor in 2014.

== Research ==
Cai publishes methodology in statistics (including statistical computing) and psychometrics, and conducts applied research in educational measurement, health outcomes, and developmental psychology. He serves on the editorial boards of various journals in quantitative methods in the social sciences.

== Software ==
Cai develops flexMIRT, a statistical program for multilevel modeling and multidimensional item response theory. In addition, he is the coauthor (with David Thissen, his doctoral advisor) of IRTPRO, another program for parametric estimation and test scoring.
