= Mitchell Chang =

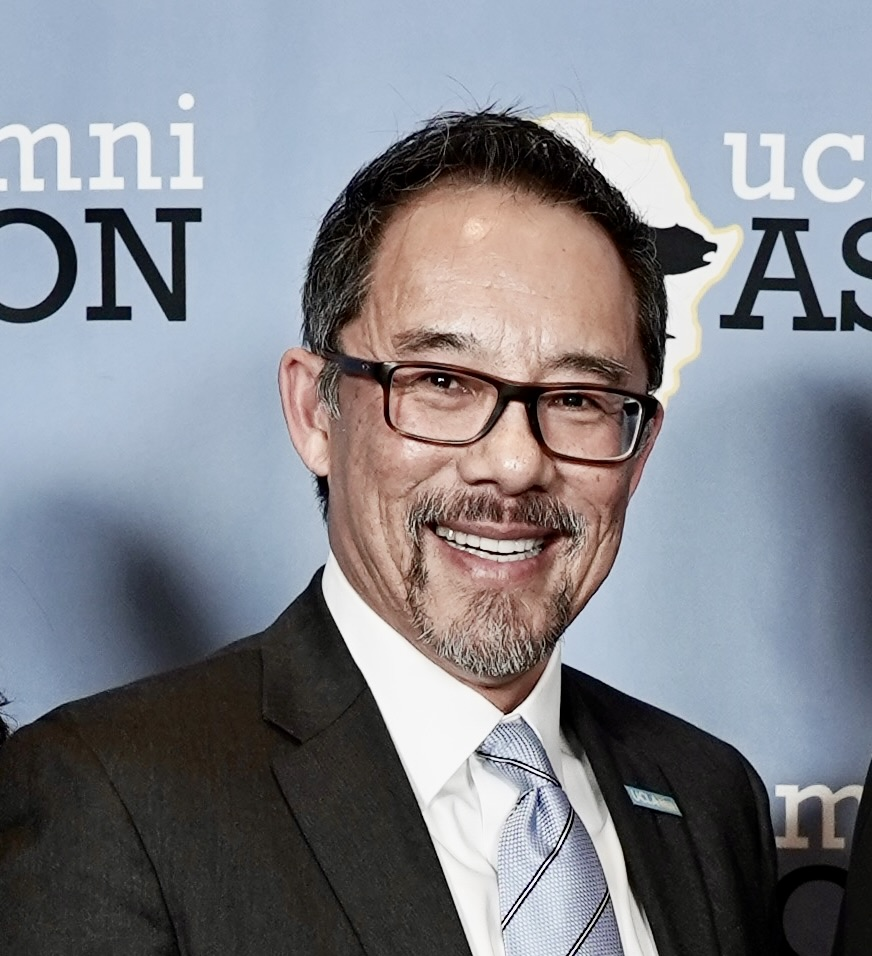
- Born: Mitchell James Chang; March 5, 1965 (age 61); Taiwan
- Education: University of California, Santa Barbara (BA); Harvard University (EdM); University of California, Los Angeles (PhD)
- Occupations: Professor, University Administrator, Journal Editor

Mitchell J. Chang (March 5, 1965) is a Professor of Higher Education and Organizational Change and Asian American Studies (by courtesy) at the University of California, Los Angeles. He has been on the UCLA faculty since 1999. From March 2018- February 2022, Chang served as the Editor in Chief of The Journal of Higher Education. On July 1, 2023, he began an appointment as Interim Vice Provost at UCLA, after having served as Associate Vice Chancellor of Equity, Diversity, and Inclusion. Chang returned to the UCLA faculty full-time in the summer of 2025.

== Early life and education ==
Born in Taiwan, Chang immigrated to San Jose, California in 1971, where his father pursued a career in Silicon Valley and his mother worked for Sumitomo Bank. He and his family are beneficiaries of the Fair Housing Act, Title VIII of the Civil Rights Act of 1968, which made it illegal to practice housing discrimination. He noted that this federal legislation made exposure to diversity an “inescapable reality” for him and his family, but racism was still very present.

Upon matriculating at the University of California, Santa Barbara, Chang was exposed to ethnic studies and the broader diversity of the university, which helped him understand better the educational implications of his childhood exposure to a wide range of racial and cultural differences. This continued at Harvard University and the University of California, Los Angeles (UCLA), where Chang also examined issues informed by his work in the San Jose public school system and by the national controversy over affirmative action. His 1996 doctoral dissertation was one of the first studies to test former U.S. Supreme Court Justice Lewis Powell’s claims about the educational benefits of exposure to racial diversity in his opinion on the case Regents of the Univ. of Cal. v. Bakke 438 U.S. 265 (1978), which is often referred to as the diversity rationale for justifying race conscious admissions practices in U.S. higher education.

== Career ==
Chang's research focuses on the educational efficacy of diversity-related initiatives on college campuses and how to apply those best practices toward advancing student learning and democratizing institutions. He has written over one hundred publications, some of which were cited in the U.S. Supreme Court ruling of Grutter v. Bollinger, one of two cases involving the use of race sensitive admissions practices at the University of Michigan. He later served as an expert witness on the case Students for Fair Admissions vs University of North Carolina.

Chang received a National Academy of Education/Spencer Foundation Fellowship in 2001 and was awarded the Outstanding Outcomes Assessment Research Award, 1999-2000 by the American College Personnel Association for conducting one of the first studies to document empirically the positive educational impact of racial diversity on students’ learning and college experiences. In 2006, he was profiled as one of the nation's top ten scholars by Diverse: Issues in Higher Education and in 2008, he and his co-researchers received the ACPA Asian Pacific American Network Outstanding Contribution to APIDA Research Award. Chang has also served in elected positions for both the American Educational Research Association (at-large Member of AERA Executive Council & Division J), which inducted him as a Fellow in 2016, and the Association for the Study of Higher Education (Board of Directors), which awarded him the Founder's Service Award in 2014 and the Research Achievement Award in 2020. He has also been named among the Top 150 in the Edu-Scholar Public Influence Rankings.

At UCLA, Chang has served in numerous roles, including as Division Head and Faculty Chair. He has also been a member of the Legislative Assembly of the Academic Senate, Graduate Council, Administrative Committee of the Academic Senate, Chancellor’s Education Innovation Task Force, Moreno Report Implementation Committee, Center for the Advancement of Teaching Faculty Advisory Committee, Committee on Degrees and the Advancement of Students, Undergraduate Learning Assessment Committee, Committee on Intercollegiate Athletics, UCOP Advancing Faculty Diversity Advisory Group, and the Council on Academic Personnel. In his capacity as the Interim Vice Provost of EDI, Chang oversaw the Civil Rights Office and the Research and Bruin Engagement Office, and served on the Chancellor’s Cabinet, Dean’s Council, and Senior Leadership Team. During that time, he also led efforts to advance faculty diversity principally through UCLA’s Faculty Forward Initiative and a climate study funded by the University of California Office of The President. Annually, he managed a budget that exceeded $15 million and over 40 staff members. In 2018, Chang was inducted into the Order of the Golden Bruins.

Nationally, Chang has served on many advisory panels, including for the U.S. Department of Education, White House Domestic Policy Council, National Science Foundation, National Institute of Health, and College Board. Chang previously worked as Associate Dean at Loyola Marymount University, where he helped to supervise the structuring and teaching of the undergraduate diversity course requirement and as a school evaluator at the Alum Rock Elementary School District in San Jose, where he oversaw the achievement testing program
