= World Council for Comparative Education Societies =

International organization of comparative education societies

World Council of Comparative Education Societies
- Abbreviation: WCCES
- Formation: 1970; 56 years ago
- Founded at: Ottawa, Canada
- Type: NGO
- Legal status: Active
- Affiliations: UNESCO
- Website: www.worldcces.org

The World Council of Comparative Education Societies (WCCES) is an international organization of comparative education societies created in 1970 in Ottawa, Canada. It is organized as an NGO in operational relations with UNESCO. The current president is Kanishka Bedi.

== History ==
The WCCES was founded in 1970 in Ottawa, Canada, by the Comparative and International Education Society (CIES). The founding members include comparative education pioneers Joseph Katz (Comparative and International Education Society of Canada) (CIESC), Gerald Read (CIES-USA) and Leo Fernig (International Bureau of Education). They were greatly influenced by the spread of national, regional and language-based comparative and international education societies during the 1960s and founded the WCCES to unite the societies that existed at the time: the CIES-USA, the CIESC, the Comparative Education Society in Europe (CESE), the Japan Comparative Education Society (JCES) and the Korean Comparative Education Society (KCES). With the purpose of spreading comparative education globally, the WCCES has gained 46 national, regional and language-based member societies as of 2025.

== Governance and operation ==
Although the WCCES is open to all eligible societies, it mainly serves the academic community. The organization supports research programs that concern globalization, theory and methods in comparative education and gender equality and equity in education, among other topics. Through its recruitment efforts, the WCCES has been able to facilitate the formation of new member societies and maintain existing ones that were nearly defunct.

The WCCES holds a World Congress normally every three years and symposia every year in-between two consecutive Word Congresses, where individuals representing member societies convene in a general assembly. The general assembly shares updates on the WCCES work that has transpired in the years since it last convened and engages in decision-making when necessary. The WCCES Executive Committee—the president, two vice presidents, executive director, treasurer and member society representatives—and chairpersons convene at least annually to govern the organization.

The WCCES Executive Committee has planned to hold World Congresses in various regions of the world to stimulate comparative education activity where they are held. Due to the limited funding the WCCES receives, the executive committee meetings are usually held online through Zoom.

== List of presidents ==
The following people have served as presidents of the World Council of Comparative Education Societies (WCCES) since its founding in 1970.

President	Term
Joseph Katz	1970–1974
Brian Holmes	1974–1977
Masunori Hiratsuka	1977–1980
Erwin H. Epstein	1980–1983
Michel Debeauvais	1983–1987
Vandra Masemann	1987–1991
Wolfgang Mitter	1991–1996
David N. Wilson	1996–2001
Anne Hickling-Hudson	2001–2004
Mark Bray	2004–2007
Crain Soudien	2007–2010
Wing On Lee	2010–2013
Carlos Alberto Torres	2013–2016
N’Dri Thérèse Assié-Lumumba	2016–2024
Kanishka Bedi	2024–present

== Publications ==
The WCCES publishes two peer-reviewed journals, Global Comparative Education: Journal of the WCCES co-edited by N'Dri T. Assie-Lumumba and Kanishka Bedi and World Voices Nexus: The WCCES Chronicle co-edited by Kanishka Bedi, Gauri Hardikar and Oleg Gubin, and WCCES-Brill Book Series edited by Kanishka Bedi. The journal and the chronicle are published in the six official languages of the United Nations, viz. Arabic, Chinese, English, French, Spanish and Russian.

== Inclusion and diversity ==
Historically, the WCCES has mainly operated its affairs and online presence in English, due to the relatively few resources the executive committee has had compared to better-resourced organizations such as UNESCO.

Because attendance at WCCES meetings is self-funded by member society representatives, equitable representation has been a concern. The executive committee has responded to the issue by holding World Congresses and Symposia in hybrid mode - onsite as well as online.

== Congresses ==
Historic list of conferences
Number	Location	Year
I	Ottawa (Canada)	1970
II	Geneva (Switzerland)	1974
III	London (UK)	1977
IV	Tokyo (Japan)	1980
V	Paris (France)	1984
VI	Rio de Janeiro (Brazil)	1987
VII	Montreal (Canada)	1989
VIII	Prague (Czech Republic)	1992
IX	Sydney (Australia)	1996
X	Cape Town (South Africa)	1998
XI	Chungbuk (Korea)	2001
XII	Havana (Cuba)	2004
XIII	Sarajevo (Bosnia and Herzegovina)	2007
XIV	Istanbul (Turkey)	2010
XV	Buenos Aires (Argentina)	2013
XVI	Beijing (China)	2016
XVII	Cancún (Mexico)	2019
XVIII	Ithaca, New York (United States)	2024

== Member societies ==
The WCCES member societies include the following:

- Association Française pour le Développement de I'Éducation Comparée et des Échanges (AFDECE)
- Association Francophone d'Éducation Comparée (AFEC)
- Africa for Research in Comparative Education Society (AFRICE)
- Asociación de Pedagogos de Cuba (Sección de Educación Comparada) (APC-SEC)
- African Society of Comparative and International Education, Technology and Youth (ASCIETY)
- British Association for International and Comparative Education (BAICE)
- Council on Comparative Education of Kazakhstan (CCEK)
- China Comparative Education Society (CCES)
- Comparative Education Society of Asia (CESA)
- Comparative Education Society of Hong Kong (CESHK)
- Comparative Education Society of India (CESI)
- Comparative Education Society of Iran (CESIR)
- Comparative Education Society of Nepal (CESON)
- Comparative Education Society of the Philippines (CESP)
- Comparative and International Education Society - United States (CIES)
- Comparative and International Education Society of Canada (CIESC)
- Czech Pedagogical Society (Comparative Education Section) (CPS-CES)
- Chinese Taipei Comparative Education Society (CTCES)
- Egyptian Comparative Education & Educational Administration Society (ECEEAS)
- Global Africa Comparative and International Education Society (Global Africa CIES)
- The Gulf Comparative Education Society (GCES)
- Greek Comparative Education Society (GCES)
- Haitian Association for the Development of Comparative Education (HADCE)
- Hungarian Educational Research Association - History of Education (Comparative Education Section) (HERA-HECES)
- Israel Comparative Education Society (ICES)
- Indian Ocean Comparative Education Society (IOCES)
- International Society of Comparative Education, Science and Technology Nigeria (ICEST)
- Japan Comparative Education Society (JCES)
- Korean Comparative Education Society (KCES)
- Mondial Association for Peace by Comparative Education (MAPE)
- Mediterranean Society of Comparative Education (MESCE)
- Nederlandstalig Genootschap voor de Vergelijkende studie (Dutch Speaking Society of Comparative Education) (NGVO)
- Oceania Comparative and International Education Society (OCIES)
- Réseau Africain Francophone d’Education Comparée (RAFEC)
- Russian Council of Comparative Education (RCCE)
- Southern African Comparative and History of Education Society (SACHES)
- Sociedade Brasileira de Educação Comparada (SBEC)
- Sociedad Española de Educación Comparada (SEEC)
- Sezione Italiana della CESE (SICESE)
- Sociedad Iberoamericana de Educación Comparada (SIBEC)
- Sociedad Mexicana de Educación Comparada (SOMEC)
- Portuguese Society of Education Sciences-Section of Comparative Education (SPCE-SEC)
- Sociedad Uruguaya de Educación Comparada y Internacional (SUECI)
- Sociedad Venezolana de Educación Comparada (SVEC)
- Turkish Comparative Education Society (TÜKED)
- Ukrainian Comparative Education Society (UCES)
