= Comparative education =

Social science discipline

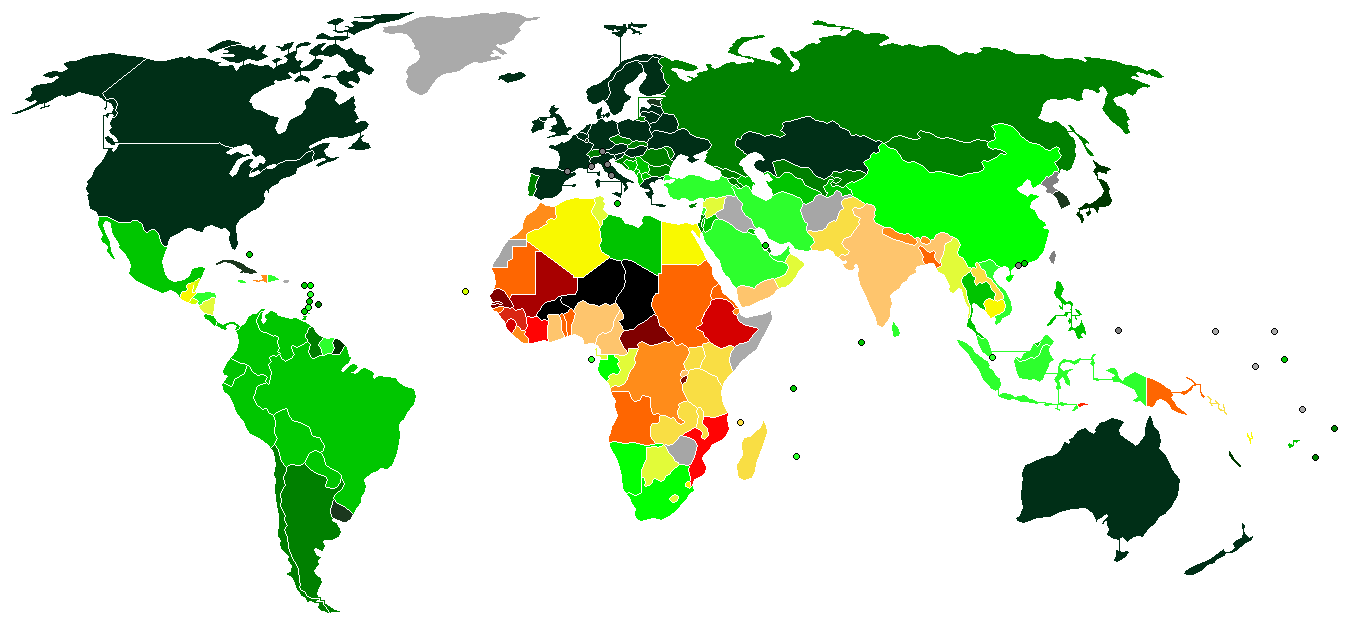
Comparative education assessment with Education Index with high-scoring countries in green, low-scoring countries in red.

Comparative education is a discipline in the social sciences which entails the scrutiny and evaluation of different educational systems, such as those in various countries. Professionals in this area of endeavor are absorbed in advancing evocative terminologies and guidelines for education worldwide, enhancing educational structures and producing a context to which the success and effectivity of education programs and initiatives can be assessed.

== Objectives ==
According to scholars in the field, comparative education has five purposes:

- To describe educational systems, processes, or outcomes.
- To assist in the development of educational institutions and practices.
- To highlight the relationships between education and society.
- To establish generalized statements about education that are valid in more than one country.
- To help the current generation understand the nowadays education systems with reference to the past.

Comparative education is often incorrectly assumed to exclusively encompass studies that compare two or more different countries. In fact, since its early days researchers in this field have often also studied international institutions, international cooperation, and transnational influences on education systems and practices. Single-country and single-site studies have made important contributions to the field. Some large-scale projects, such as the PISA and TIMSS studies, have made important contributions to the field through explicitly comparative macro analysis of massive data sets.

== Rationale ==
Many important educational questions can best be examined from an international and comparative perspective. For example, in the United States, there is no nationwide certificate of completion of secondary education. This raises the hypothetical question of what may be the advantages and disadvantages of leaving such certification to each of the 50 states. Comparative education may draw on the experience of countries such as Japan and France, for instance, to show how a centralized system works, and illustrate the possible advantages and disadvantages of a more centralized approach to educational certification. Critics of comparative education sometimes disparagingly refer to its approaches and conclusions as "policy borrowing," with the implication that policies are best developed organically according to local needs rather than what appears to have worked in other contexts. However, comparative education scholars argue that education everywhere faces many of the same challenges, and there is much to learn from both successes and failures in other contexts.

== Disciplinary vs. interdisciplinary identity ==
Comparative education is closely related to, and may overlap with, international education, international development education, and comparative sociology. There are also efforts to expand and "decolonize" the field of philosophy of education with a comparative education approach. While in some countries, comparative education is fully established as a distinct field of educational research, in others it might best be regarded as an interdisciplinary field that brings together scholars from diverse specializations. For instance, specialists in math education, social studies education, or various arts subjects may develop research designed to enable meaningful comparisons between national educational systems with a focus on their specific subject area of expertise. It follows that comparative education research can examine schooling holistically and globally (macro-level analysis), or may alternatively focus on the status of a particular subject area in a specific region of the world, thereby benefiting from subject-area or regional expertise (meso- or micro-level analysis). Each approach may have characteristic advantages and disadvantages.

== Theories ==
According to the Bloomsbury Handbook of Theory in Comparative and International Education, the theories used in comparative education can be broken down into 5 categories: foundational theories, post-foundational theories, theoretical adaptations and revisions, theories of policy and practice, and interdisciplinary and emerging approaches.

Foundational theories include structural-functionalism, imperialism, colonialism, coloniality, Marxism, human capital theory, dependency theory, and world-system analysis. Structural-functionalism, associated with Talcott Parsons, attempts to explain social phenomena in relationship to a larger systems. In comparative education this entails analyzing education in the context of social, political, and other systems it interacts with. Imperialism in comparative education involves the exploration of how powerful nations to impose their educational practices and knowledge on others. Collins English Dictionary defines colonialism as "the practice by which a powerful country directly controls less powerful countries and uses their resources to increase its own power and wealth". In comparative education this looks at how educational systems have been shaped by this control. Marxist theory in comparative education looks at the role that social hierarchy plays in education. "In one of the most influential writings on the role of education in development in the 20th century, Theodore W. Schultz explored the idea of education as a form of capital and introduced the notion of education as a form of human capital."

Post-foundational theories in comparative education include post-colonialism, post-modernism, post-structuralism, post-socialist transformation, and gender theories. A post-colonialism lens of comparative education seeks to understand the role that colonial and post-colonial education systems have on cultural mixing and who has been included in forming educational systems. Post-modernism is based on a pluralistic and reflexivity episteme with a focus on space, information, and performativity. Post-structuralism rejects ideas of structuralism that draw conclusions about society and educational systems based on language usage. They argue that language can only be understood in context of the system that produced it. Post-socialist transformation in education examines how educational processes have changed in formerly socialist countries such as the soviet union. These scholars examine how political and western influences have changed education since the fall of socialism. A focus on gender in comparative education can take many different focuses from how gender is defined, to equity in educational practices between genders, access to education, the effect of education for women on politics and economy, and violence against women in the educational system.

Theoretical adaptations and revisions used in comparative education are neo-liberalism, neo-institutionalism, neo-realism, neo-Gramscian, regimes and regionalism, and cultural political economy (CPE). Neo-liberalism examines the privatization of education where corporations control education through private institutions, financing for teacher or training, or other influences of capitalism. Neo-institutionalism looks at institutional change in education as a result of choice, historic factor, or social change. The neo-realist theory of international relations in education looks at not only the role of the state's authority in education, but also on how international structures shape educational systems. The neo-Gramscian school examines the interaction between material capabilities, ideas, and educational institutions. The study of regimes and regionalism looks at who is shaping educational systems, regional or global entities. According to Verger, Fontdevila, and Zancajo "CPE is an analytical and heuristic approach that pushes us to observe how drivers of a different nature (agentic and structural, global and local, material and ideational, etc.) interact in the production of pro-privatization reforms through the mechanisms of variation, selection and retention."

Comparative education theories of policy and practice are constructivism, learner-centeredness, differentiation theory, externalization, policy borrowing, policy lending, peace education theory, and human rights education. Constructivism in comparative education examines the factors that influence which ideas gain traction, influence and ultimately become practice in education. A learner-centeredness approach is a social constructivism approach that looks at the ways in which student learning is influenced by beliefs, learning strategies, learning styles, and personal characteristics. Differentiation theory, sometimes called systems theory, attempts to simplify a system by looking at what is part of a system and what is its environment. Externalization uses differentiation theory to examine how ideas are transferred between groups. According to Steiner-Khamsi, "whereas diffusion relates to the outcome of educational transfer, the study of borrowing and lending deals with the process by which reforms are transplanted from one context to another." Peace education examines education that enables learners to work towards comprehensive peace and an end to social violence. Human rights education examines content and processes for teaching about human rights as well as the desired goals and outcomes of this education.

Interdisciplinary and emerging approaches to comparative education include theorizing about race and racism, queer theory, transitologies, actor-network theory, social network analysis, and capabilities approach. Theories about race and racism in education look at the ways in which our systems of education support and reinforce social differences based on race. Queer theory in comparative education looks at ways in which students can examine tradiational education in a more inclusive, critical, and radical lens to include queer perspectives. Transitologie focuses on transformation in education and the political, social, economic and ideological changes that coincided with the metamorphosis. Actor-network theory examines how human and non-human forces interact and influence education changes. Social network analysis looks at the web of connections between individuals or organizations to understand how educational ideas are shared and transmitted. The capabilities approach examines the link between knowledge and capability as well as the ways in which education can assist individuals in meeting their capability.

== Comparative and International Education Society ==
The Comparative and International Education Society (CIES) was founded in 1956 to foster "cross-cultural understanding, scholarship, academic achievement, and societal development through the international study of educational ideas, systems, and practices."

== Comparative Education Society of India ==
The Comparative Education Society of India (CESI) was established in 1979 and admitted to the World Council of Comparative Education Societies (WCCES) in 1980. The annual conferences of CESI bring together Education Researchers from across the country to present papers on different topics connected to the theme of the conference.

== Comparative Education Societies of Latin America ==
Comparative Educational Societies in Latin America include:

1. Argentinean Society of Comparative Studies in Education (SAECE).
2. Association of Pedagogues of Cuba – Comparative Education Section (APC-EC)
3. Brazilian Society of Comparative Education (SBEC);
4. Mexican Society of Comparative Education (SOMEC);
5. Uruguayan Society of Comparative and International Education (SUECI);
6. Venezuelan Society of Comparative Education (SVEC);

In 2014, the six Latin American societies of comparative education noted above worked together with comparative education societies in Spain and Portugal to establish the Ibero-American Comparative Education Society (SIBEC).

== In Latin America ==
=== Spanish-speaking Latin America ===
Since the end of the 19th century, the development of Comparative Education in Latin America can be characterized as "weak and uneven". This characterization can be caused due to factors such as the limited development of educational research, the professional orientation of universities, persistent low levels of investment in research and development, and difficulties in producing and updating national indicators as well as regional and cross-national databases. Acosta and Ruiz (2018) note that, "While some countries in the region, especially those in the Southern Cone, did participate in what is called the 'foreigner pedagogy' when they set up their educational systems (Acosta2011), the field did not take root or flourish as a consistent academic study (López Velarde 2000)" (p. 62–63).

During the 1950s–1970s, international organizations such as United Nations Education, Scientific and Cultural Organizations (UNESCO) contributed significantly to the development of regional studies and databases intended to facilitate educational planning at a national level. These incentives were largely incentivized by Human Capital Theory, which focused on improving the quality of education to produce a higher level of productivity among its population.

During the 1990s, significant educational reform occurred throughout the region, with the involvement of regional and international organizations, and in the context of the recovery of democracy and neoliberal economic adjustment. Following this period, significant growth of comparative education studies was evident both in academic production and works from international organizations. The increase in studies and publications during the 1990s added to the general growth of educational research in the region, which was linked to educational reform policies, expansion of graduate programs, and governmental incentives to research, among other factors. The Educational reforms throughout Latin America prompted studies on regional trends, comparisons between countries in the region, and analyses of individual cases in terms of global imperatives.

Gorostiaga and Espinoza (2019) go on to note that "studies from international organizations were particularly prone to identifying "good practices" or "lessons learned" that may be transferred from one country to another (Acosta & Ruiz, 2018), an exercise that could be seen as part of strategies for legitimizing homogeneous recipes of education reform (Krawczyk, 2013). Academic production, on the other hand, tended to portray regional patterns and national cases as the result of impositions from international organizations or the hegemony of neoliberal rationalities" (p. 83)

=== The Mesoaxiological Perspective ===
Touriñán López (2022) presents the concept of the Mesoaxiological Perspective, an approach to education that is developed alongside the culture of the region. The term Mesoaxiological is derived from three separate Greek words that when combined mean, understand-local place, and valorized; in other words, Mesoaxiological Perspective refers to taking into consideration of the local culture when developing education. Numerous philosophers such as John Dewey, Ira Shor, and Henry Giroux have advocated that the usage of social justice should be inseparable from education. Within the notion of Mesoaxiological perspective, there is an overlap with the views of critical pedagogy. Critical pedagogy incorporates aspects of critical theory, which focuses on society and culture as a means to challenge power structures.

== In Europe ==
Europe is a broad term that covers 45 countries. 27 of these countries are members of the European Union (EU). In 1993, the EU developed the Copenhagen Criteria, which, among many other things, set forth three priorities for changes in their education systems. These priorities were:

1. learning how to keep on learning throughout our lives; combining knowledge with know-how;
2. developing each individual's creativity and initiative;
3. establishing the right of each individual to lifelong training (all young people would be given vouchers entitling them to initial education and/or training later on)

In 1999, 29 European countries gathered at the University of Bologna and signed the Bologna declaration. The Bologna Process is the name given to the implementation of the standards and quality of higher education outlined in the declaration. There are now 49 participating countries, with the most recent signatory joining in 2015. The idea is to bring more coherence to higher education across Europe so that students, faculty, and staff can have international mobility, higher education becomes more inclusive and accessible, and overall, European higher education becomes more "attractive and competitive worldwide". There are three facets of this process:

1. introduce a three-cycle higher education system which consists of bachelor's, master's, and doctoral studies
2. ensure the mutual recognition of completed qualifications and learning periods at other universities
3. implement a quality assurance system in order to strengthen both the quality and the relevance of the learning and instruction

The Erasmus+ program is one way that the member states of the Bologna declaration have worked to fulfill the second facet of the Bologna Process. The program was created in 1987 as a student exchange program for higher education. In 2014, it became a program for study, training, or work as well. It runs in six-year cycles, with the current cycle running until 2027. The current program places a strong emphasis on social inclusion, digital transition, green initiatives, and promoting the participation in democratic life to young people. It implements the EU Youth Strategy 2019–2027, supports the European Pillar of Social Rights, and develops the European dimension in sports, all while supporting the priorities and activities outlined in the European Education Area (EEA), the Digital Education Action Plan, and the European Skills Agenda. There are opportunities for mobility and cooperation between institutions in higher education, vocational education and training, school education (including early childhood years), adult education, youth activities, and sports. Each year, Erasmus+ publishes a Program Guide on their website, giving an overview of the opportunities provided and the organizations that are taking part in the program.

In 2017, European leaders endorsed the idea of a European Education Area (EEA) during the Social Summit in Sweden. In 2018 and 2019, the first measures of the EEA were adopted. The EEA member countries focus their efforts on improving the quality of and equity in education and training; teachers, trainers, and school leaders; digital education; green education; and the EEA in the world. They do this by setting different goals and requirements in each area of education, from early childhood through adult learning, and including vocational education and training. Currently, in higher education, the EEA is putting their efforts into micro-credentials, a European Universities Initiative, the European Student Card Initiative, quality higher education, inclusive and connected higher education, and innovation in education. Micro-credentials are qualifications that students can gain through short, transparently-assessed courses. The European Universities Initiative facilitates the formation of partnerships between European higher education institutions for collaboration. European Student Cards help students and higher education institutions that are participating in Erasmus+ by simplifying the administration and enhancing the digitization of the program. The other three areas of concentration focus on making higher education in EEA member states high quality, relevant, inclusive, connected to the local communities, and full of innovation.

Each year, the European Commission publishes a comparative report on education in their member states. The 2022 report covers the right, timing, and kind of learning that citizens in European countries are facing, including the difficulties and disparities that are found in various areas of education. However, they also offer suggestions for dealing with these issues and how to continue working toward the goals of the EEA. The reports are prepared by the European Commission's Directorate-General for Education, Youth, Sport and Culture with contributions from other countries and commissions that work on education, and are accompanied by reports from the 27 member countries of the EU.

== See also ==
- A Comparative Analysis of the Histories of Different Countries' Education Systems
- Comparative Education Review
- Comparative Research
- Educational anthropology
- International Society for Comparative Adult Education
- UNESCO-IBE
- World Council for Comparative Education Societies

=== Influential scholars ===
- Mark Bray
- Nicholas Burbules
- Brian Holmes
- Torsten Husen
- Andreas Kazamias
- John W. Meyer
- Harold J. Noah
- Fernando Reimers
- Val D. Rust
- Carlos Torres
- Gita Steiner-Khamsi
