= Hamlet Isakhanli =

Azerbaijani polymath (born 1948)

- Hamlet İsaxanlı

Personal details
- Born: March 1, 1948 (age 78) Kosali, Gardabani, Georgia
- Citizenship: Soviet Union (until 1991), Azerbaijan (1991 to present)
- Spouse: Naila Isayeva
- Website: Official website

Hamlet Abdulla Oglu Isayev (Azerbaijani: Hamlet Abdulla oğlu İsayev, IPA: [hɑmˈlet ɑbdulˈlɑ oɣˈlu iˈsɑjef]; born March 1, 1948) is an Azerbaijani polymath, mathematician, professor, poet, translator, entrepreneur, author, and specialist in science, culture, and the history of education.

He founded Khazar University and served as president from 1991 to 2010, and is currently chairman of the university's board of directors and trustees. He founded Dunya School, founded a publishing house in Baku, Azerbaijan, and translates poetry, lectures, and edits. He is a founding member of the Eurasian Academy.

"Hamlet Isakhanli" (Azerbaijani: Hamlet İsaxanlı, IPA: [hɑmˈlet isɑxɑnˈlɯ]) is his pen name used in publications in the humanities, social sciences, and poetry. His works in mathematics are published under the surname Isayev (Г.А. Исаев, Hamlet Isaev or Hamlet A.Isayev). He is also known as Hamlet Isakhanli (Hamlet Isaxanli, Hamlet İsaxanlı)).

As a polymath, Isakhanli's academic and literary works cover a broad range of fields.

== Biography ==
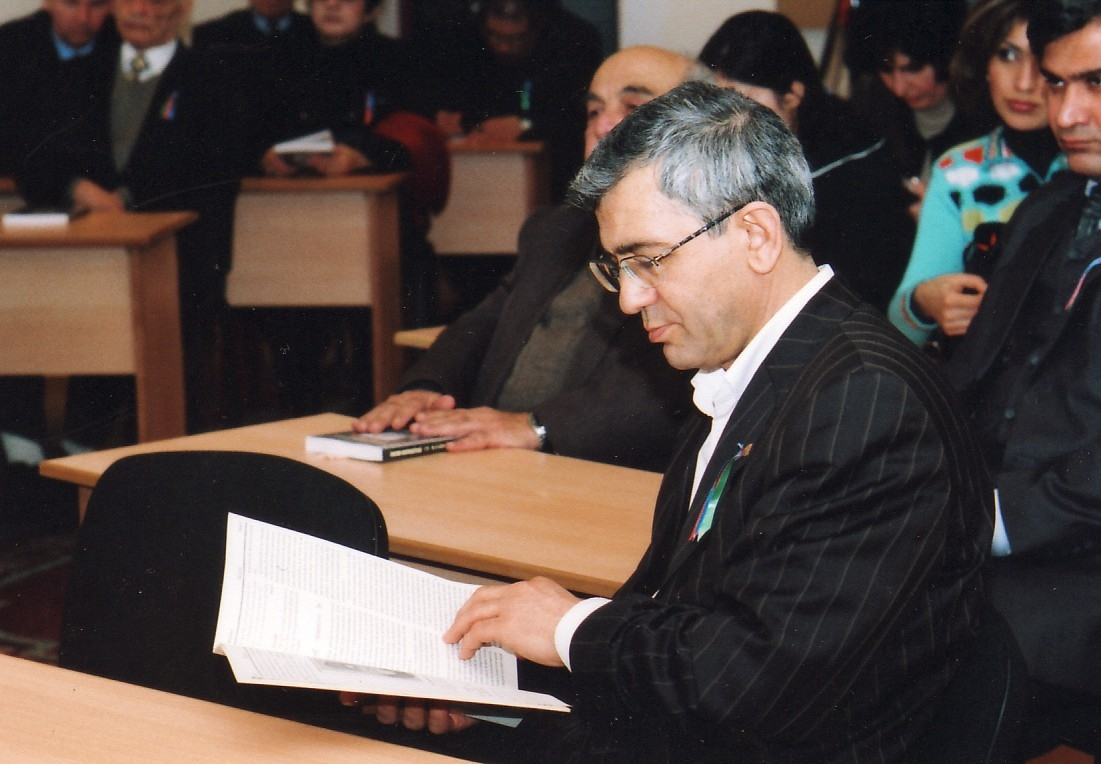
Hamlet Isakhanli at a conference

Isakhanli finished high school with a gold medal and was admitted to the Faculty of Mechanics and Mathematics at Azerbaijan State University (BSU) in 1965. In 1970, he graduated with honors, and was admitted to postgraduate studies at BSU, before attending Lomonosov Moscow State University for graduate studies and research. In 1973, he received a Ph.D. in physical-mathematical sciences.

From 1973 to 1983, he was a professor at Azerbaijan State Institute of Oil and Chemistry (currently Azerbaijan State Oil Academy), and chaired the department of mathematics at the Baku campus of Leningrad Institute of Economics and Finance.

Isakhanli is a member of the Hajibayramli clan.

He was married to Naila Isayeva.

== Research ==
Isakhanli is a co-author and co-editor of the Khazar English-Azerbaijani Comprehensive Dictionary in six volumes, of which the first three volumes have been published.

Isakhanli discusses in his writings the problems of poetry and philosophy, political science and international relations, history, and journalism.

== Poetry ==
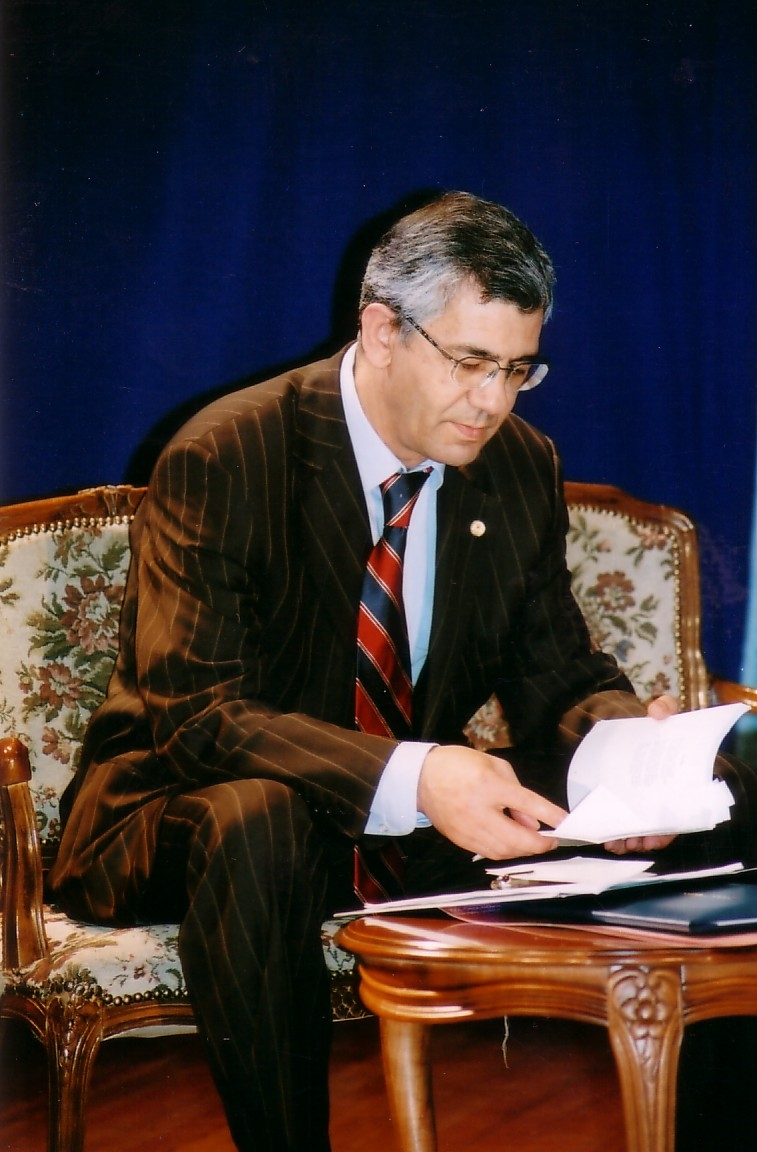
Hamlet Isakhanli presents his work at a poetry evening.

Isakhanli has translated poetry written in English, Russian and French, into Azerbaijani, particularly the poems of George Gordon Byron, W. Blake, Robert Herrick, and Gérard de Nerval, Vasily Zhukovsky, Evgeny Baratynsky, Fyodor Tyutchev, Afanasy Fet, Sergei Yesenin, Nikolay Gumilev, Anna Akhmatova, and Alla Akhundova. The lyrics of his poems have been used for composing songs and musical performances.

== Reforms in education ==
Isakhanli studied educational organizations in the West, and in the late 1980s, wrote about an educational crisis in the Soviet Union and Azerbaijan, offering solutions in articles published in newspapers—and broadcast on radio and TV—in Azerbaijan and Russia.

== Khazar University and Dunya School ==
Khazar University (previously Azerbaijan University), established on March 18, 1991, was the first private university, and one of the first officially established universities, stablished in Azerbaijan in the post-Soviet era. It features a Western-type curricula, a flexible credit accumulation system, a student-centered model of education, application of modern methods of management, broad and effective international relations, and local and foreign specialists.

Dunya School, established by Isakhanli in 1998, is affiliated with Khazar University, and provides pre-school, primary, secondary, and high school level students with bilingual education in Azerbaijani and English languages, offering an International Baccalaureate and IB Diploma Program.

== Awards ==
In 2010, Isakhanli received the National Khazar Award in recognition of his contributions to Azerbaijani education and for founding an institution aligned with international academic standards.

== Publications ==
- "The Life of the Scholar And Founder" by Fuad Tanriverdiyev, Baku, 1997.(in Azerbaijani)
- "What I Brought To This World" by Knyaz Aslan and Vahid Omarli, Baku, 2005 (in Azerbaijani and Russian)
- "In Search of Khazar" by Hamlet Isakhanli, Baku, 2006 (in English, Azerbaijani and Russian)
- "On the Education System in Transition Economy. A View From Azerbaijan" by Hamlet Isakhanli, Baku, 2006
- Emily Van Buskirk, "Current Trends in Education in Azerbaijan - A discussion with Professor Hamlet Isakhanli", Caspian Studies Program, Harvard University, April 25, 2001, Accessed on April 14, 2006
- Hamlet Isakhanli - Assembly of Science and Art. 1-10. Khazar University Press, Baku, 2008 (in Azerbaijani)
- Lyudmila Lavrova. "An invitation to traveling to the poetry world - 'Contrasts'". Preface to the book by Hamlet Isakhanli, published in Moscow in Russian
- Гамлет Исаханлы «Контрасты». Kнигa cтихотворений" (В переводах Аллы Ахундовой). "ИзoгpaфЪ", Москва, 2006)
- The Social and Political Context of Sovietization and Collectivization Period in the Central Transcaucasia and Isakhan Revolt (in Azeri) / Proceedings of the Conference "Socio-political Thought of the XX Century." Baku, May 12, 1996 – Baku: Khazar University Press, 1996 – p. 1-16

Also // Georgia newspaper – Tbilisi – 1996 – No 34-42
Also // Khalg newspaper – Baku – 1996 – No. 148-150

- Fragments From the History of Thought and Education (in Azeri) // Khazar View, 1998–1999. No. 57-64
- Negotiations on Nagorno-Karabagh: Where do we go from here? / Summary and transcript from a panel discussion held on April 23, 2001. Caspian Studies Program, John F. Kennedy School of Government, Harvard University
- Minority Education Policy in Azerbaijan and Iran / Hamlet Isakhanli, Val D. Rust, Afgan Abdullayev, Marufa Madatova, Inna Grudskaya, Younes Vahdati // Journal of Azerbaijani Studies. – 2002. – Vol. 5. – No. 3–4. – p. 3–78
- Karakmazli, D. Taste of a Fig: Poems and Translations. Baku: Uyurd, 2005./Poems of Hamlet Isakhanli translated from Azeri into Russian – p. 180–190
- Perspectives on the United States (Hamlet Isakhanli, Anar Ahmadov) in "Global Perspectives on the United States: A Nation by Nation Survey". Vol. 1. – Great Barrington: Berkshire Publishing Group, 2007 – p. 31-33
- Hamlet Isakhanli. What is Happening in the Modern World in the Field of Higher Education and How "The State Program to Reform the Higher Education System of the Azerbaijan Republic for the period of 2008-2012" May Best be Carried Out? (in Azeri). Khazar University Press, Baku, Azerbaijan, 2008
- An Interesting Person (in Azeri) / Interview was led by X. Macidoglu // 525 newspaper – 2008 – January 29 (No 15) – p. 4
- Hamlet Isakhanli: "A creative person desires neither his house to be high, nor his name..." Interview with Hamlet Isakhanli (in Azeri) // 525 newspaper – 2008 – October 11 (No.187) – p. 20
- Nagiyev R. Formula of Vengeance (in Azeri) // Kommunist – 1987 – July 2 – p. 6
- Odinets V. At the Universities of Canada (in Russian) // Sovetskiy Ekonomist – 1989 – January 27 – p. 4
- Hamlet Isayev (Issakhanly) // Who's Who in the Former Soviet Union – Surrey, England: Debrett's Peerage, Ltd., 1994 – p. 22-23
- Seyidova I. "Khazar" - is a Lake which Can be Called a Sea (in Russian) // Consulting and Business – Baku – 1996 – p. 82-83
- Who Dedicates Himself to Work and Regards it as a Field of Creativity will Never be Exhausted and Become Discouraged ... (in Azeri) / Interview was led by V. Omarov // Khazar View – 1997 – No. 32 – p. 3-5
- Mustafayev C. Poetry Gets Mingled with Intellect (A foreword to Hamlet Isakhanli's book "Contrasts") (in Azeri) – Baku: Khazar University Press, 2001 – p. 15
- Suleymanli M. Inner Expression of the Great Word (in Azeri) // 525 newspaper – 2002 – September 3 – p. 7

and Hemistichs Taking Reader Together: While Reading the Book "Contrasts" by Hamlet Isakhanli (in Azeri) // Khazar View – 2002 – September 15 (No 129). – p. 6-9

- Nazirli K. Poetic World of the Well-known Scholar. On Hamlet Isakhanli's Book "Contrasts" (in Azeri) // Khazar View – 2003– No 152 – p. 14-15
- Metin Turan. New Azerbaijan Poetry and Hamlet Isakhanli (in Turkish) // LİTTERA. Edebiyat Yazıları – Ankara – 2004 – v.14 – p. 163-168. Also (in Azeri) // 525 newspaper – 2005 – June 28 – p. 7
- A Spouse of "Contrasts" Author and the Target of the "Emotions Turned out into Poetry" (in Azeri) / Interview was led by S. Gulten // "Qadin Dunyasi" newspaper – 2004 – November 5–18 (No 21) – p. 9
- Nazirli K. Hamlet Isakhanli's Sensitive Poetry (in Azeri) // Khazar View – 2005 – November 1 (No 196) – p. 21-23.

Also // 525 newspaper – 2005 – October 12 – p. 7

- "When you are straightforward, sincere, and good-willed, you also feel an admiration of surrounding you people" (in Azeri) / X. Ahmadov, Z. Aliyeva // "Geopolitika" newspaper – 2007 – No. 38 – p. 12
- Isayev (Isakhanli) Hamlet Abdulla (in English and Russian) / M.B. Babayev // Azerbaijan Mathematicians XX Century – Baku: Oka Ofset, 2007 – p. 77
- Mecidoglu Kh. The Beloved One of the God (in Azeri) // Khazar View – 2008 – January 1 (No. 242) – p. 8-11
- Mecidoglu Kh. About my friend (in Azeri) // 525-ci qazet– December 20, 2008 – No. 235 – p. 26
- Mecidoglu Kh. If We don't Pass From Aspirations to Deeds / Our Hopes will Vanish and Become in Vain (in Azeri) // Khazar View – 2008 – March 1 (No. 246) – p. 7-9.
- Nazarli T. The Way Taking its Start From the Command of Soul (in Azeri) // Azerbaijan – 2008 – March 19 (No. 61)
- Khazar View – 2008 – 01 aprel (No. 248). – p. 14-16.
