= Anne Hickling-Hudson =

Anne Hickling-Hudson is a Jamaican-born educator, comparative education scholar, and academic known for her work in postcolonial and international education. She is professor emerita at Queensland University of Technology (QUT), Australia, where she taught for over two decades. She has held leadership roles in multiple international education organizations, including serving as President of the World Council of Comparative Education Societies (WCCES). Hickling-Hudson has authored or co-authored over 70 publications.

== Early life and education ==
Anne Hickling-Hudson was born and raised in Jamaica. She completed a Bachelor of Arts (Honours) in History and a Master of Arts in education at the University of the West Indies. After beginning her career in education, she pursued further postgraduate study, earning additional qualifications including a Master of Education, a Graduate Diploma in Media, and a Doctor of Philosophy.

== Career ==
=== Academic career ===
Hickling-Hudson began her academic career teaching in the Caribbean and later held academic positions in the United Kingdom, the United States, and Hong Kong. In 1987, she joined the Queensland University of Technology in Australia. Over a 25-year tenure at QUT, she specialized in comparative and international education, cross-cultural pedagogy, and teacher education. Following her formal retirement in 2012, she was appointed professor emerita and continued her association with QUT as an adjunct professor in the Faculty of Creative Industries, Education and Social Justice.

Hickling-Hudson has also played prominent roles in international academic organizations. She served as President of the World Council of Comparative Education Societies (WCCES) from 2001 to 2004. In addition, she held presidencies in other associations, including the British Association for International and Comparative Education (BAICE), the Australia and New Zealand Comparative and International Education Society (ANZCIES), and the Australian Association for Caribbean Studies (AACS).

== Selected works ==
- The Capacity to Share: Cuba’s International Cooperation in Educational Development. Palgrave Macmillan, 2012.
- Disrupting Preconceptions: Postcolonialism and Education. Post Pressed, 2004
- Decolonizing the curriculum: Education for development or for neocolonialism?, (2005) In N. Burbules & C. Torres (Eds.), Globalization and Education: Critical Perspectives. Routledge.
- Cultural complexity, postcolonial perspectives, and educational change: Challenges for comparative educators. (2006) International Review of Education, 52(1–2), 201–218.
