= Mejai Bola Avoseh =

Nigerian-American academic

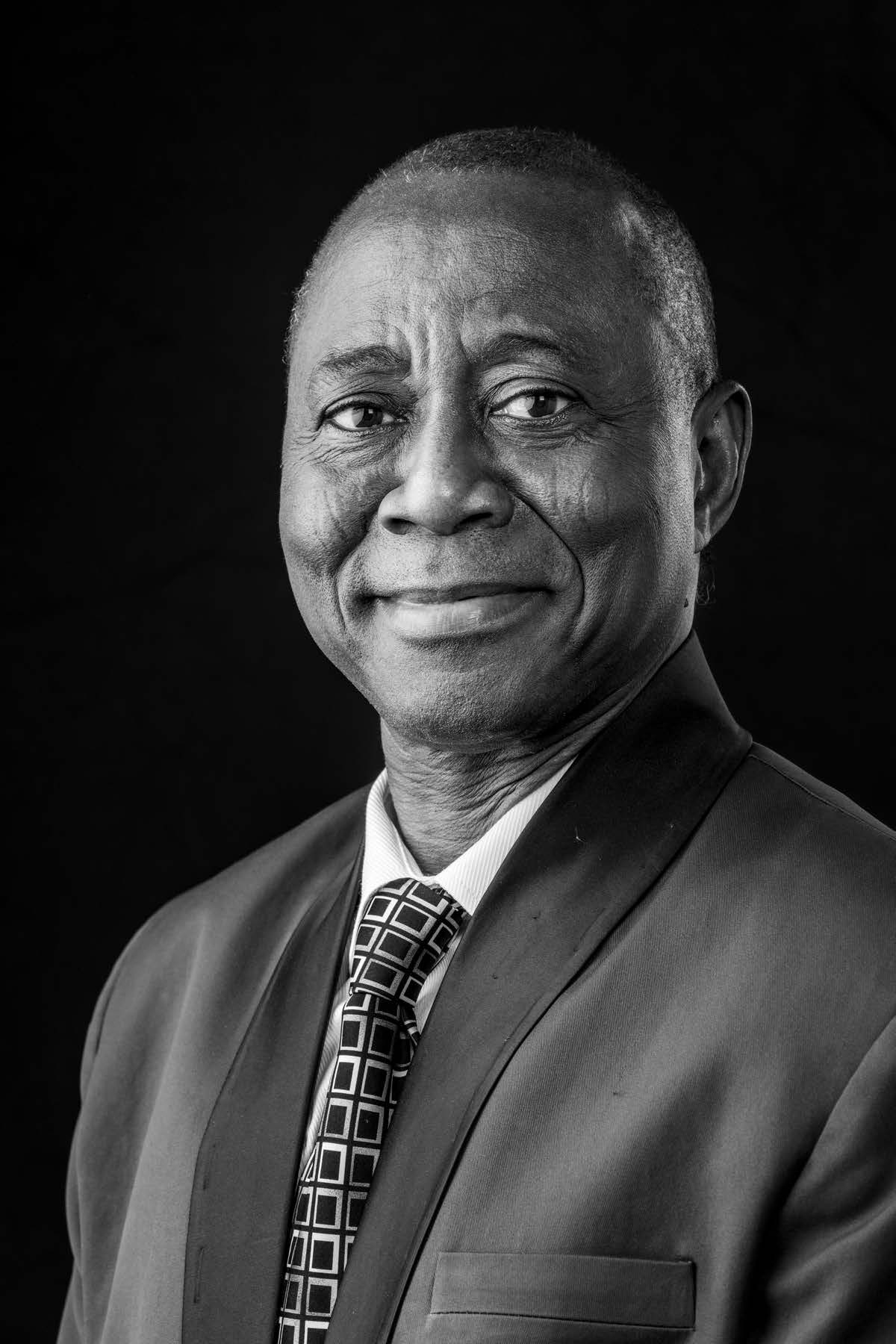
- Avoseh
- Awards: IACE Hall of Fame, AAACE Outstanding Service Medallion, Fulbright Award

Academic background
- Education: University of Ibadan
- Thesis: Literacy as Political Empowerment in Paulo Freire’s Philosophy of Education (1991)

Academic work
- Discipline: Adult education Continuing education
- Institutions: University of South Dakota
- Website: www.usd.edu/faculty-and-staff/Mejai-Avoseh

Mejai Bola Avoseh is a professor of adult and higher education at the University of South Dakota. His teaching and research interests are in the areas of adult education, comparative/international/multi-cultural education and indigenous pedagogy. He is a member of the board of the American Association for Adult and Continuing Education (AAACE) since 2016, and of the International Society for Comparative Adult Education (ISCAE) from 2020 to 2023, and the director of the Commission for International Adult Education (CIAE) of AAACE.

== Education ==
Avoseh received his bachelor's and master's degrees in philosophy, a postgraduate diploma in teacher education, and a Doctor of Philosophy (Ph.D.) degree in adult education all from the University of Ibadan, Nigeria in 1982, 1984, 1986 and 1991 respectively. He also holds a Master of Science degree in educational leadership and administration from the College of Saint Rose, Albany in 2006. Avoseh is a certified K-12 teacher and administrator with the State of New York. He also holds the state's SAS (School Administrator and Supervisor) and SDA (School and District Administration) certifications.

== Career ==
Avoseh began his post-secondary level teaching career as an adjunct lecturer at the Department of Adult Education, University of Ibadan and Saints Peter and Paul Seminary, Ibadan from 1986 to 1995. He then moved to the University of Namibia where he taught from 1998 to 2001 after which he moved to the U.S. as a Teacher in the New York City Public School System from 2001 to 2004. He was appointed an assistant professor at the University of South Dakota in 2004, and ultimate a full Professor in 2015.

Avoseh has researched, designed and taught several courses in the areas of adult and continuing education especially learning theories, social justice and indigenous pedagogy, and international education in Nigeria, Namibia, United States, and in Botswana (as a Fulbright scholar). He was awarded the Outstanding Service Medallion of the American Association for Adult and Continuing Education (AAACE) in 2019. Avoseh is a double recipient of the J. William Fulbright Core Award for U.S. Scholars for teaching and research. He earned his latest Fulbright Award in March 2019 to teach and research in Nigeria. In recognition of his distinguished contributions to the field of adult and continuing education, Avoseh was in September 2021 named to the prestigious International Adult and Continuing Education (IACE) Hall of Fame, and his induction will be held on October 6, 2021. In June 2022, Avoseh was one of five selected by the United States Department of Education through the Deputy Director of the Division of Adult Education and Literacy in the Office of Career, Technical and Adult Education to attend the CONFINTEA VII, an international conference on adult education held in Marrakech, Morocco.

Avoseh has published widely in different areas of adult and higher education, international and comparative education, diaspora and global citizenship, rural development, literacy, indigenous/cultural education as well as in gender and policy issues in education in various first-tier disciplinary journals and with leading publishers. His classic article on lessons of traditional Africa for lifelong learning is often cited across disciplines.

== Selected publications ==
- Avoseh, M. B. M., and Erica Whitiker, "Social Justice and Retention: A Study of Marginalized Statistical Minority Students at a Predominantly White Rural Institution in the U.S.," Excellence and Innovation in Learning and Teaching 17, no. 2: 5-21.
- Avoseh, M. B. M., "The Ubuntu Narrative in Enhancing Social Justice Adult Education in Sub-Saharan Africa," In Mejai Avoseh (ed.), Proceedings of the 2019 International Pre-Conference of the Commission for International Adult Education (AAACE) (St. Louis: AAACE, 2019), 173–182.
- Avoseh, M.B.M. "Adult Learning and Education for Global Citizenship in South Africa." In Global Citizenship Education Project. (Hamburg: UNESCO's Institute for Lifelong Learning, 2019).
- Avoseh, Mejai B. M. "Adult Education and Participatory Research in Africa: In Defence of Tradition," Canadian Journal of Development Studies 21:sup1 (200): 565–578.
- Avoseh, M. B. M. "Learning to be active citizens: lessons of traditional Africa for lifelong learning," International Journal of Lifelong Education 20, no. 6 (2001): 479–486.
- Avoseh, M. B. M. "Literacy, Education, and the Women's Question in Nigeria," Asian Journal of Women's Studies 5, no. 4 (1999): 91–99.
- Avoseh, M. B. M. "Literacy education for active citizenship and sustainable development," International Journal of Literacy Education 9, no. 1 (2019): 1–3.
- Avoseh, M. B. M., and Greta Giese. "Herzberg's Theory of Motivation as a Predictor of Job Satisfaction: A Study of Non-Academic Community College Employees," Excellence and Innovation in Learning and Teaching 2 (2018): 38–52.
- Avoseh, Mejai Bola Mike, and Olugbenga Abimbola Fayomi. "Ubiquitous Indigenous African Lifelong Education as "New" Foundations for Sustainable Human Development," In Mafalda Carmo (ed.), Education and New Developments 2017 (Lisbon: InScience Press, 2017), 618–622.
