= Research in Teacher Education =

- Discipline: Education
- Language: English
- Edited by: Gerry Czerniawski, Caroline Brennan, David Wells, David Morris

Publication details
- History: 2011 - present
- Publisher: University of East London (United Kingdom)
- Frequency: Biannually

Standard abbreviations
- ISO 4: Res. Teach. Educ.

Indexing
- ISSN: 2046-1240 (print); 2047-3818 (web)

Links
- Journal homepage

Research in Teacher Education (RiTE) is a free, open access online academic journal published biannually by the Cass School of Education and Communities of the University of East London (UEL). It is registered with the British Library catalogue of journals. The academic journal offers a forum for informed debate and discussion on all aspects of teacher education. Articles cover a wide range of educational topics and issues that are of interest to professionals within this sector. In addition, each edition of Research in Teacher Education publishes research findings, book reviews and/or opinion pieces from guest writers associated with the Cass School of Education and Communities.

== History ==
Research in Teacher Education was launched in April 2011. Originally the journal was called "Research in Secondary Teacher Education (RiSTE)". The editorial board consists of editor Gerry Czerniawski (who is also a council member of the International Forum for Teacher Educator Development), assistant editor Caroline Brennan, online periodical editor David G. Wells and book reviews editor David Morris. All four are teacher educators at the University of East London. The journal's primary goal is to nurture and publish work on teacher education from many subject disciplines and pedagogical methodology.

It also publishes work by guest writers including Professors Meg Maguire (King's College, London), Graham Welch, Stephen Ball (both Institute of Education, University of London) and Jim O'Brien (University of Edinburgh). The journal is supported by appropriate subject associations and professional bodies and can be found linked to the Teacher Education Advancement Network (TEAN) website, for example.

In October 2012 RiSTE became RiTE (Research in Teacher Education); incorporating articles, writing and research from primary and post compulsory education & training, teacher educators, too.

The latter months of 2012 has also seen the journal grow into the next phase of its development by securing an international advisory board. This board is made up of prominent international researchers in teacher education from universities in Australia, Canada, Israel, Germany and Norway as well as the UK; and will add an intercontinental input in future RiTE editions alongside UK teacher education focused articles. Jesse Paul

== Cass School of Education and Communities ==
The University of East London's, Cass School of Education and Communities is located in the Stratford (London) campus. The building was opened by Cherie Blair in 2009 who in her opening speech stated, "I believe the Sir John Cass School of Education will be a catalyst for major change in the education landscape across London". The Cass School of Education and Communities is supported by, and bears the name of, the Sir John Cass Foundation, a London based charity that supports education participation and achievement. Academic taught programmes are offered at undergraduate and postgraduate level and include courses in early childhood, language and diversity, multilingualism, teacher education, race and community, youth and community, learning and teaching, comparative education, professional education and social work. The school also supports research in these areas.

== Initial teacher training (ITT) programmes ==
The Cass School of Education and Communities offers initial teacher training (ITT) programmes for Primary, Secondary and Post-Compulsory phases. The initial teacher education teams work in partnership with schools in the east London area but this also extends into other London boroughs and out into the Home Counties. They offer initial teacher training for secondary school teacher subject specialists in a variety of curriculum areas. Subject knowledge enhancement courses are also offered. Primary ITT programmes include the Post Graduate Certificate in Primary Education (PGCE). This programme is also offered with specialisms in Modern Languages, English, English as an Additional Language, Maths and Special Educational Needs.
