= Crain Soudien =

South African academic and educationist

Crain Soudien ASSAf, FAAAS, IAE
- Citizenship: South African
- Education: University of Cape Town; State University of New York at Buffalo
- Occupation: Academic
- Employer(s): University of Cape Town, Human Sciences Research Council
- Known for: Research on race, identity, and education in South Africa
- Title: Emeritus Professor

Crain Arthur Soudien is a South African academic and educationist who was chief executive officer of the Human Sciences Research Council from 2015 to 2021. He is emeritus Professor and former Deputy Vice-Chancellor at the University of Cape Town, where he held senior roles related to academic planning, social responsiveness, and institutional transformation. From 2007 to 2011, he was President of the World Council of Comparative Education Societies and is a fellow of several national and international scholarly academies.

== Early life and education ==
Soudien completed his undergraduate and honours degrees at the University of Cape Town, earning a BA and a BA (Hons) in Comparative African Government and Law. He went on to complete a master's degree and a Higher Diploma in Education at the same institution. He later obtained an Ed.M and Ph.D. from the State University of New York at Buffalo.

== Career ==
=== Academic career ===
Soudien joined the University of Cape Town in 1988 as a faculty member in the School of Education. He later was Director of the school and held various institutional leadership roles, including Deputy Vice-Chancellor responsible for academic planning and institutional transformation. His academic work has focused on the sociology of education, race, identity, and youth development, with a strong emphasis on the South African post-apartheid context. He has published extensively on these themes and has been involved in curriculum reform and higher education policy.

=== Leadership roles and public service ===
Soudien was vice-president of the World Council of Comparative Education Societies from 1998 to 2003 and as president from 2007 to 2011. He chaired South Africa's Ministerial Committee on Transformation and Social Cohesion in Higher Education, appointed in 2008, and led reviews on discrimination in textbooks and governance in public schooling. At the University of Cape Town, he held the role of Deputy Vice-Chancellor responsible for academic planning and transformation. In 2015, he was appointed chief executive officer of the Human Sciences Research Council, until 2021. He is a fellow of the Academy of Science of South Africa, the American Academy of Arts and Sciences, and the International Academy of Education.

=== Research and publications ===
Soudien's research focuses on race, identity, education policy, and social difference, with particular emphasis on post-apartheid South Africa. His scholarship examines how historical inequalities continue to shape educational experiences and youth identity. He has written extensively on curriculum reform, transformation in higher education, and the sociology of schooling.

His publication record includes the authoring and co-authoring of over 180 articles, reviews, reports, and book chapters. His published works include Youth Identity in Contemporary South Africa: Race, Culture and Schooling (2007), Realising the Dream: Unlearning the Logic of Race in the South African School (2012), and Cape Radicals: Intellectual and Political Thought of the New Era Fellowship, 1930s–1960s (2019). His writing is widely cited in studies of education, social justice, and transformation in the global South.

== Selected works ==
- Youth Identity in Contemporary South Africa: Race, Culture and Schooling (2007)
- Realising the Dream: Unlearning the Logic of Race in the South African School (2012)
- Cape Radicals: Intellectual and Political Thought of the New Era Fellowship, 1930s–1960s (2019)
