= Val D. Rust =

American historian (1934-)

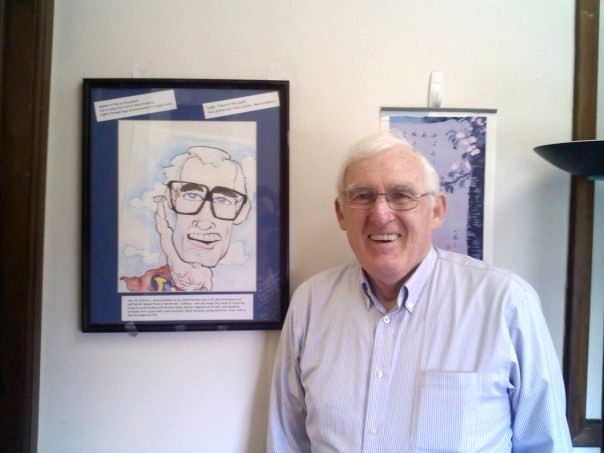
- Born: November 28, 1934 (age 91)
- Education: Ph.D. in education
- Alma mater: University of Michigan
- Occupation: Professor of education
- Years active: 40
- Employer: University of California, Los Angeles
- Known for: Contributions to comparative education
- Spouse: Diane Harding
- Children: 3

Val Dean Rust (born November 28, 1934) is a professor at the UCLA Graduate School of Education and Information Studies at the University of California, Los Angeles.

== Background ==
Rust was born into a family with roots in the Church of Jesus Christ of Latter-day Saints (LDS Church). In the early 1960s, Rust taught high school in Murray and Salt Lake City, Utah.

Rust attended Brigham Young University and then received his Ph.D. in education from the University of Michigan in 1967. He did research at Deutsches Institut für Internationale Pädagogische Forschung in Frankfurt, Germany and postdoctoral studies at the University of Oslo in Norway.

Rust married Diane Harding and they had three children.

== Career ==
After graduation, Rust became an assistant professor of education at the University of Hawaiʻi at Mānoa in Honolulu from 1967 to 1969.

In his time at UCLA (1969–2008), Rust has been faculty chair of the UCLA Graduate School of Education and Information Studies, director of the International Education Office, and associate director of CIDE. He has also served as a guest professor at institutions such as Padagogische Hochschule in Freiburg, Germany, Khazar University in Baku, Azerbaijan, Humboldt University of Berlin, and the University of Oslo; He has received Honorary Doctorate from Khazar University.

His professional service includes key positions with the Comparative and International Education Society (Board of Directors 1979–82; president, 1990–91); the Higher Education Special Interest Group (founding co-chairperson, 2008–2013); and the scholarly journal Comparative Education Review (associate editor, 1998–present).

In addition to his scholarly contributions, Rust is also co-founder and associate director of UCLA's Center for International and Development Education (CIDE). CIDE, founded in April 2002, serves as a hub for researchers and organizations from a wide range of disciplines. The center's mission is to provide quality information through a series of publications, research programs and practical initiatives. CIDE engages in educational development projects around the world in areas such as teacher education, higher educational change, educational finance, and international educational leadership. Though he technically retired in 2008, he continues to work with incoming doctoral students as an academic advisor and with CIDE.

In November 2013, Rust was the target of a protest claiming that microaggressions were common in the culture of UCLA. Approximately 25 students, many representing students of color, staged a sit-in in Rust's classroom and stated that they objected to his writing of grammatical corrections on assignments. Rust said he was committed to "being rather thorough" with graduate students. Rust was defended by former students and also other members of students of color.

== Publications ==
Rust has been a major contributor to the field of comparative education for more than 45 years, authoring and co-authoring more than 100 books and articles. His primary research interests include the politics of education reform, the role of education in broader social change, and internationalizing higher education.

His diverse body of work includes: The Unification of German Education (1995), The Democratic Tradition and the Evolution of Schooling in Norway (1989), and Alternatives in Education: Theoretical and Historical Perspectives (1977). Rust has also given a number of lectures emphasizing the relevance of postmodernism to the field, most notably his 1990 presidential address to the Comparative and International Education Society and his 2004 Eggertsen Lecture, titled "Postmodernism and Globalization: The State of the Debate."

In 2004 Rust published Radical Origins: Early Mormon Converts and Their Colonial Ancestors through the University of Illinois Press, which examined his own Mormon lineage and its relationship to the radical early American religious culture.
