= Harold J. Noah =

American educator (1925–2019)

Harold J. Noah (1925–January 2019) was an American educator, whose research and writing have focused on comparative education and economics of education. He was born in London, England, and moved to the United States in 1958. His higher education began at the London School of Economics and King’s College, University of London, and was followed by a Ph.D. at Teachers College, Columbia University. He served as Professor at Teachers College, Columbia, from 1964 to 1987. He was appointed to the Gardner Cowles chair in economics of education. He served as Dean of the College from 1976 to 1981. He is widely recognized as a distinguished authority in the field of comparative education.

In studies of Soviet education in the 1960s and 1970s Noah dealt primarily with the economic and public finance aspects of schools and higher education in that country. In his teaching he espoused the use of what were at the time increasingly accepted concepts of human capital and rates of return to examine the nature and extent of private and public investments in education and training, in both market and command economies.

From the mid-1960s onward, Noah advocated the use of empirical social science methods in comparative education. Much of this work was done in collaboration with his long-standing coauthor, Max A. Eckstein. This collaboration began with “Toward A Science of Comparative Education”, which described and critiqued the development over time of methods of comparing national systems of education. The book sounded a powerful call for the application of positivist methods in comparative education studies.

Among his most notable works are:

- ”Financing Soviet Schools” (1966). This was his PhD dissertation. A major finding was that, contrary to general belief in the West, the Soviet government was more financially supportive of general secondary education than of specialist vocational education.
- ”The Economics of Education in the U.S.S.R.” (1969). Translation of a collection of conference papers presented in 1964 at the Lenin Pedagogical Institute, Moscow. The Soviet editor was Professor V.A. Zhamin, rector of the Institute.
- “Toward a Science of Comparative Education” (1969), and the companion book, “Scientific Investigations in Comparative Education” (1969). Both books coauthored with Max A. Eckstein. The two books opened a vigorous debate among scholars and researchers in comparative education about the merits and demerits of the approach advocated. This is a debate far from settled.
- ”The National Case Study: An Empirical Comparative Study of Twenty-One Educational Systems. International Studies in Evaluation VII” (1976). Coauthored with A.H. Passow, Max A. Eckstein and John Mallea). Based upon data collected by the International Association for the Evaluation of Educational Achievement (IEA).
- ”Secondary School Examinations: International Perspectives on Policies and Practice” (1993). Coauthored with Max A. Eckstein. Describes, analyses, and critiques secondary school leaving examinations in eight major countries. Suggests some lessons for future United States practise. Advocates a positive though cautious approach to a nationwide system of examinations.
- ”Doing Comparative Education: Three Decades of Collaboration” (1998). Coauthored with Max A. Eckstein. Brings together selections from Noah’s and Eckstein’s published works. Contains a foreword by Philip Foster, who locates the coauthors in the development of comparative education and subjects their work to a friendly, yet searching review
- ”Fraud and Education: The Worm in the Apple” (2001). Coauthored with Max A. Eckstein. This study employs data from many countries to describe the nature, extent, and possible consequences of dishonest conduct in and around schooling, higher education, and scientific research. It suggests some remedies, while cautioning that continuing advances in the ease of electronic communication and an increasingly competitive social ethos all militate against easy solutions to the problems raised by cheating, professional misconduct and falsification of research findings.

== Works ==
BOOKS

Financing Soviet Schools (New York: Teachers College Press, 1966) The Economics of Education in the U.S.S.R. (New York: Praeger, 1969). Library of Congress Number 68-18925

(with Max A. Eckstein) Toward a Science of Comparative Education (New York: Macmillan, 1969), and the companion book, Scientific Investigations in Comparative Education (New York: Macmillan, 1969). Library of Congress Numbers, respectively, 69-11406 and 69-17349

Reviews of National Policies for Education:Germany (Paris:Organisation for Economic Development and Cooperation, 1972) (with A.H. Passow, Max A. Eckstein and John Mallea) The National Case Study: An Empirical Comparative Study of Twenty-One Educational Systems. International Studies in Evaluation VII (Almqvist and Wiksell, 1976)

Reviews of National Policies for Education: Canada (Paris:Organisation for Economic Development and Cooperation, 1979) (with Joel Sherman) Educational Financing and Policy Goals for

Primary Schools: General Report (Paris:Organisation for Economic Development and Cooperation, 1979)

The following were co-authored with Max A. Eckstein:

International Study of Business/Industry Involvement in Education (New York: Institute of Philosophy and Politics of Education, Teachers College, Columbia University, 1987)

Examinations: Comparative and International Studies (Oxford: Pergamon Press, 1992) ISBN 0-08-041031-6 Secondary School Examinations: International Perspectives on Policies and Practice (New Haven: Yale University Press, 1993). ISBN 0-300-05393-2

Doing Comparative Education: Three Decades of Collaboration (Hong Kong: The University of Hong Kong Press, 1998). ISBN 962-8093-87-8 Fraud and Education: The Worm in the Apple (Lanham, Maryland: Rowman and Littlefield, 2001). ISBN 0-7425-1032-8

SELECTED OTHER PUBLICATIONS

"Use and abuse of comparative education", Comparative Education Review 28:4 1984

(with Max Eckstein) "Dependency theory in comparative education: the new simplicitude," UNESCO, Prospects XV:2 1985

"Education, employment, and development in communist societies," in E.B. Gumbert ed., Patriarchy, Party, Population, and Pedagogy (Atlanta, GA: Georgia State University, 1986)

"General education in the modern university," in Hermann Röhrs ed., Tradition and Reform of the University in International Perspective (Frankfurt-am-Main: Peter Lang, 1987)

(with John Middleton) China's Vocational and Technical Training (The World Bank, 1988)

(with Max Eckstein) "Dependency Theory in Comparative Education: Twelve Lessons from the Literature," in J. Schriewer ed., Theories and Methods in Comparative Education (Frankfurt-am-Main: Peter Lang, 1988)

(with Max Eckstein) "Tradeoffs in Examination Policies: An International Comparative Perspective," Oxford Review of Education 15:1 1989

"Forms and Functions of Secondary-School Leaving Examinations," Comparative Education Review 33:3 1989

"An International Perspective on National Standards," Teachers College Record 91:1 1989

"Bildungspolitik und Internationale Studien zum Bildungswesen," Bildung und Erziehung 44:1 1991.
