= Thierry Luescher =

South African-Swiss author and researcher

Thierry M. Luescher
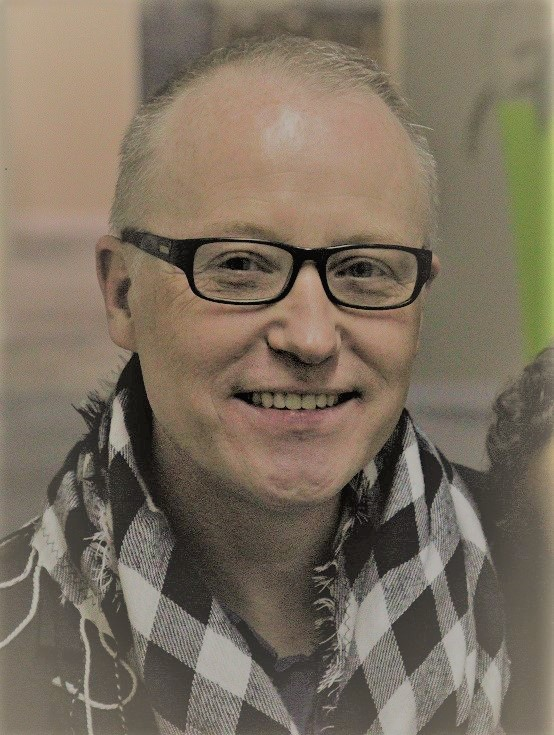
- Thierry Luescher
- Born: 1971 (age 54–55); Zofingen, Switzerland
- Education: University of Cape Town, University of the Free State
- Occupations: Author, researcher, professor
- Notable work: Student Politics in Africa: Representation and Activism (2016), Reflections of South African Student Leaders, 1994-2017 (2020), #FeesMustFall and its Aftermath: Violence, Wellbeing and the Student Movement in South Africa (2022), #FeesMustFall Ten Years On (2026)
- Website: https://crishet.mandela.ac.za/Staff-Associates/Thierry-Luescher https://eraonline.uct.ac.za/converis/portal/detail/Person/766127842

Thierry M. Luescher is a South African-Swiss author, researcher and director at the University of Cape Town, an adjunct professor at Nelson Mandela University and research fellow of the University of the Free State. Thierry Luescher was born in Zofingen (Switzerland), in 1971, grew up in Oberentfelden and Muhen, and moved to South Africa in 1995 to study African languages, African history and political science at the University of Cape Town (B.A. 1999; PhD, 2009).

== Early politics ==
During his formative years, Luescher's mother and father were both involved in local politics and members of the Social-Democratic Party of Switzerland. In 1989, Luescher became involved in activist youth politics as a member of the LGBTI advocacy group HAZ in Zurich and gave interviews and made several appearances on Swiss television on the HIV/Aids pandemic then raging through Switzerland's gay community. He was a member of the first Youth Session of the Swiss Parliament in 1991, as a representative of the national organisation "Initiative Lesbisch/Schwule Jugend Schweiz (ILSJS)". After relocating to South Africa in 1995, he became a member of Abigail (the Cape Town-based Association of Bisexuals, Gays and Lesbians) where he met a number of gay anti-apartheid activists, including Zackie Achmat, who later founded the Treatment Action Campaign.

== Student politics and public mandate ==
While studying at the University of Cape Town, Luescher became a member of the South African Students Congress which deployed him to stand as candidate for the university's Students' Representative Council (SRC) in 1999. He was SRC Vice-President from 1999 to 2000 and a member of the national executive committee of the South African Union of Students (then SAU-SRC) in 2001. In 2019, Luescher was a surprise candidate for the national election to the Swiss National Council on the international list of the Social-Democratic Party of the canton of Fribourg, Switzerland.

== Research and education career ==
Luescher started a career in research into higher education politics as the first researcher of the statutory South African advisory body to the Minister of Higher Education, the Council on Higher Education (2002-2008). He was a postdoctoral fellow (2009-2012) and senior lecturer (2012-2014) in Higher Education Studies at the University of the Western Cape. In 2014, Luescher moved to the University of the Free State in Bloemfontein/Mangaung to take up the post of assistant director for institutional research (2014-2017). During that time, he also added to his PhD in Political Science from UCT a postgraduate diploma in higher education teaching and learning.

In 2017, he was appointed research director for higher education in the Human Sciences Research Council. From 2022 to 2025 he oversaw the education research portfolio of the Human Sciences Research Council as Strategic Lead: Equitable Education. In 2025, Luescher was appointed Director: Postgraduate Studies and Researcher Development at the University of Cape Town.

Luescher has held honorary academic appointments, including as extra-ordinary senior lecturer in political studies with the Department of Political Science, University of the Western Cape (2011-2015), as affiliated associate professor (2017 to 2022) and research fellow (since 2022) in higher education studies with the School of Higher Education Studies, University of the Free State, and as adjunct professor to the Chair: Critical Studies in Higher Education Transformation at Nelson Mandela University since 2022.

He is a founder and trustee of the South Africa-based open access academic publisher African Minds; a founder and editorial executive of the Journal of Student Affairs in Africa (2013 to present); associate editor of the series African Higher Education Dynamics (since 2015); and international associate editor of the Ugandan Makerere Journal of Higher Education, the US Journal of College Student Development, and the European Journal of Higher Education.

== Publications and Scholarship ==
Luescher has authored and co-authored over 100 scholarly publications, including over 30 peer-reviewed journal articles, 30 book chapters, seven books (including co-edited books), and five contributions to scholarly encyclopaedias and reference works. In addition, he has written dozens of journal editorials and articles in cross-over publications on platforms like University World News and International Higher Education. His research focuses on the relationship between higher education and politics in Africa, the democratisation and transformation of higher education and its contribution to political, social and economic development, the student experience of higher education, and international comparative student affairs.

Luescher's research on South Africa's #RhodesMustFall and #FeesMustFall student movements has focused on the use of social media in student organising, the lived experiences of student activists, and issues of violence and wellbeing in the lives of student activists. This work includes the co-authored books Reflections of South African Student Leaders, 1994-2017 (2020, African Minds), #FeesMustFall and its Aftermath: Violence, Wellbeing and the Student Movement in South Africa (2022, HSRC Press), which draws on photovoice, and the co-edited book #FeesMustFall Ten Years On (2026, Mandela University Press), which examines the history, significance and legacy of the 2015/16 student movement in South Africa.

His theoretical scholarship on student politics focuses on the ethics of student political engagement as well as the theory of student activism articulated in Philip G. Altbach's work. The latter was published in 2015 and 2018, as well as in subsequent collaborative research with Altbach on contemporary student protest movements internationally and others. Other international collaborative research investigates the professionalisation of student affairs, university responses to the COVID-19 pandemic and the contribution of student affairs and services to the United Nations Sustainable Development Goals.

== Awards ==
Luescher's contribution to the study of student politics and student affairs in Africa has been recognized internationally and in South Africa. In 2018 he was awarded a C2 researcher rating by the National Research Foundation of South Africa as "currently the most published author on student politics in Africa", which was improved to a C1 rating in 2024. In addition, he has received the CEO Award (2023), the Ubuntu Research Team Award (2022) and the Mentor of the Year Award (2020) of the Human Sciences Research Council, as well as the Excellence in International Research Award (2021) from ACPA College Student Educators International and the Best Practices in International Research and Scholarship Award from NASPA - Student Affairs Administrators in Higher Education (both with co-researchers Lisa Bardill-Moscaritolo, Brett Perozzi and Birgit Schreiber).
