= N'Dri Thérèse Assié-Lumumba =

Ivorian researcher of the African diaspora

- Born: Côte d'Ivoire
- Education: University of Chicago
- Scientific career
- Workplaces: Cornell University
- Thesis: Educational selection and social inequality in Africa : the case of the Ivory Coast (1982)

N'Dri Thérèse Assié-Lumumba is an Ivorian researcher who studies the African diaspora and education. She is a Professor of Africana Studies in the College of Arts and Sciences at Cornell University. She served as President of the World Council of Comparative Education Societies (WCCES) from 2016 to 2024 and Chair of UNESCO's Management of Social Transformations Scientific Advisory Committee.

== Early life and education ==
Assié-Lumumba was born and raised in Côte d'Ivoire. She earned her bachelor's degree at the Lumière University Lyon 2, where she studied sociology and history. She moved to the United States for her graduate studies, where she earned her doctoral degree at the University of Chicago in 1982. Her research considered social inequality in Africa. In 1991 Assié-Lumumba moved to the Cornell University as a Fulbright Senior Fellow.

== Research and career ==
Assié-Lumumba (2016)

Assié-Lumumba studies the African diaspora, social institutions and African social history. She spent 2003 as a Professor in the Center for the Study of International Cooperation in Education at Hiroshima University.

She works on ways to improve the access of students from underserved communities to college. She has said that it will take more than targeted scholarships; but students must be supported in how to succeed once they get to college.

Assié-Lumumba worked with UNESCO to imagine what life might be like after the COVID-19 pandemic. She serves as Chair of the scientific advisory committee for the UNESCO Management of Social Transformations (MOST) program. As part of her work with UNESCO, Assié-Lumumba coordinates regular visits of Cornell University students to the United Nations, where they work toward projects that reduce gender inequality around the world. In July 2020 Assié-Lumumba was made the Director of the Institute for African Development.

== Awards and honours ==
- 2006 Elected Fellow of the World Academy of Art and Science
- 2010 New York State African(a) Studies Association Distinguished Africanist Award
- 2012 Frank Scruggs Faculty Fellow
- 2017 New York State African(a) Studies Association Ali A. Mazrui Outstanding Publication/Book & Educational Activities Award

== Selected publications ==
- Takyi-Amoako, Emefa J.; Assié-Lumumba, N’Dri Thérèse (2018). Introduction: Re-visioning Education in Africa—Ubuntu-Inspired Education for Humanity. Cham: Springer International Publishing. pp. 1–17. doi:10.1007/978-3-319-70043-4_1. ISBN 978-3-319-70042-7.
- Assié-Lumumba, N’Dri T. (2015). "Millennium Development in Retrospect: Higher Education and the Gender Factor in Africa's Development Beyond 2015". Millennium Development Goals (MDGS) in Retrospect. Social Indicators Research Series. Vol. 58. Cham: Springer International Publishing. pp. 81–98. doi:10.1007/978-3-319-16166-2_6. ISBN 978-3-319-16165-5.
- Assié-Lumumba, N'Dri T.; Arroyo Macarro, Margarita (2010). Mujeres en África : educación y poder : el acceso a los estudios superiores. Madrid: Iepala. ISBN 978-84-89743-60-1. OCLC 710889055.
