= Leickness Simbayi =

- Education: University of Sussex (D.Phil.)
- Occupation: Research psychologist
- Years active: 1986–present
- Employer: Human Sciences Research Council

Leickness Chisamu Simbayi is a South African research psychologist and professor. He is the current Deputy Chief Executive Officer for Research of the Human Sciences Research Council where he studies the social aspects of STIs and HIV/AIDS. In 2002, Simbayi was a part of the research team that conducted the first South African National HIV Prevalence, Incidence, Behaviour and Communication Survey and has been involved in the implementation of all subsequent surveys.

== Career ==
Simbayi received his Doctor of Philosophy degree in Experimental Psychology from the University of Sussex in England, United Kingdom. From 1986 to 2001, he taught courses in psychology at the undergraduate and graduate level at several different universities within Southern Africa. He is the former Head of Psychology Department at University of Fort Hare and the former Chairperson of the Department of Psychology at the University of the Western Cape.

Since 2001, Simbayi has been primarily studying the social aspects of STIs and HIV/AIDS, including second-generation HIV surveillance, stigma, discrimination, orphans and vulnerable children (OVC), and determinants of HIV infection. He also studies positive prevention methods used to reduce HIV risk infection which includes targeting HIV positive individuals who are aware of their status. He is the former regional coordinator in the Southern Africa Development Community (SADC) of the Social Aspects of HIV/AIDS Research Alliance (SAHARA). Simbayi has published over 100 scientific articles in peer-reviewed academic journals and has contributed to several research textbooks. He is a co-editor of the book, HIV/AIDS in South Africa 25 Years On: Psychosocial Perspectives.

=== HIV research ===
South Africa has one of the worst HIV/AIDS epidemics in the world, with an adult prevalence rate of approximately 18.90% and over 100,000 annual deaths, according to a 2016 estimate. In 2002 Simbayi was the project director for an Nelson Mandela Children's Fund, Nelson Mandela Foundation, and Human Sciences Research Council (HSRC) collaborative study that analyzed HIV prevalence in the general population, behavioural risks of infection, and mass media exposure via biobehavioural surveys. This study was the first of its kind to establish a national estimate of HIV prevalence in South Africa. The study reported a prevalence rate of approximately 11.2%, which was much lower than previously expected, causing controversy amongst the WHO and UNAIDS who questioned the validity of the findings. However, around this time another research council, ORC Macro International, began testing in other African countries and produced similar results. Thus, global estimates were shifted accordingly.

In 2005, Simbayi served in the same role for the second installment of the report. The report now included a measurement of HIV incidence, viral load, and ARV use. In 2008, Simbayi was the co-Principal Investigator for the third installment of the report which focused the health of children. In the 2012 report he was the Principal Investigator. The report sought to monitor the country's latest National Strategic Plan (NSP) for 2007-2011 and gather data for the upcoming NSP for 2012–2016. For the 2017 report Simbayi was the Overall Principal Investigator. The 2017 report focused on South Africa's efforts towards achieving the UNAIDS 90-90-90 goals.

The 2008, 2012, and 2017 installments received funding from the US President's Emergency Plan for AIDS Relief (PEPFAR). The surveys garnered national attention and were included in subsequent HIV & AIDS and STI Strategic Plans for South Africa.

== Media appearances ==
In December 2011, Simbayi appeared on a South African Broadcasting Corporation News segment to commemorate the 23rd World AIDS Day and discuss the country's new HIV and AIDS, STI and TB National Strategic Plan. In 2012, he appeared on another SABC News segment to discuss that year's South African National HIV Prevalence, Incidence and Behaviour Survey Report. Simbayi's opinion is also featured in several South African newspapers, including the Cape Times, The Sowetan, and Cape Argus.

== Personal life ==
Simbayi has a wife, Ruth, and two children, Veronica and Kennedy.

== Affiliations ==
Simbayi has worked under the Human Sciences Research Council since 2001. He has been Deputy Chief Executive Officer for Research since 2016 and was the executive director of the HIV/AIDS, STIs and TB research programme from 2010 to 2015. He is a current National Research Foundation-rated researcher, Honorary Professor in the Department of Psychiatry and Mental Health at the University of Cape Town, and a registered Research Psychologist with the Health Professions Council of South Africa's Professional Board of Psychology. He is also an Associate Editor of the Journal of Psychology in Africa. He is a member of the Academy of Science of South Africa.

== Selected works ==
- Shisana, Olive; Simbayi, LC (2002). Nelson Mandela/HSRC Study of HIV/AIDS: South African National HIV Prevalence, Behavioural Risks and Mass Media : Household Survey 2002. HSRC Press. ISBN 978-0-7969-2007-2.
- Shisana, Olive; Rehle, Thomas; Simbayi, Leickness (2005). South African National HIV Prevalence, HIV Incidence, Behaviour and Communication Survey, 2005. HSRC Press. ISBN 978-0-7969-2152-9.
- Shisana, O.; Rehle, T; Simbayi, LC; Zuma, K; Jooste, S; Pillay-Van Wyk, V; Mbelle, N; Van Zyl, J; Parker, W; Zungu, NP; Pezi, S; SABSSM III Implementation Team (2009). South African National HIV Prevalence, Incidence, Behaviour and Communication Survey, 2008. Cape Town: HSRC Press. ISBN 978-07969-2291-5
- Shisana O; Rehle T; Simbayi LC; Zuma K; Jooste S; Zungu N; Labadarios D; Onoya D et al. (2014). South African National HIV Prevalence, HIV Incidence, Behaviour and Communication Survey, 2012. Cape Town: HSRC Press. ISBN 978-0-7969-2483-4
- Simbayi, LC; Zuma, K; Zungu, N; Moyo, S; Marinda, E; Jooste, S; Mabaso, M; Ramlagan, S; North, A; van Zyl, J; Mohlabane, N; Dietrich, C; Naidoo, I; the SABSSM V Team (2019). South African National HIV Prevalence, Incidence, Behaviour, and Communication Survey, 2017. Cape Town: HSRC Press. ISBN 978-0-7969-2444-5.
- Petros, George; Airhihenbuwa, Collins O.; Simbayi, Leickness; Ramlagan, Shandir; Brown, Brandon (2006). "HIV/AIDS and 'othering' in South Africa: The blame goes on". Culture, Health & Sexuality. 8 (1): 67–77. doi:10.1080/13691050500391489. ISSN 1369-1058. PMID 16500826. S2CID 5835844.
- Rohleder, Poul; Swartz, Leslie; Kalichman, Seth C.; Simbayi, Leickness Chisamu (1 September 2009). HIV/AIDS in South Africa 25 Years On: Psychosocial Perspectives. Springer Science & Business Media. ISBN 978-1-4419-0306-8.

== See also ==
- HIV/AIDS in South Africa
- HIV/AIDS in South African townships
