= Human Sciences Research Council =

South African social science and humanities research agency

- Abbreviation: HSRC
- Formation: National Bureau of Educational Research 1929; 97 years ago; National Institute of Personnel Research 1948; 78 years ago; Human Sciences Research Council 1968; 58 years ago
- Headquarters: 134 Pretorius Street, Pretoria, 0002
- Coordinates: 25°44.881′S 28°11.097′E
- Chief Executive Officer: Sarah Mosoetsa
- Website: hsrc.ac.za

The Human Sciences Research Council (HSRC) of South Africa is Africa's largest dedicated social science and humanities research agency and policy think tank. It primarily conducts large-scale, policy-relevant, social-scientific projects for public-sector users, for non governmental organisations and international development agencies in support of development nationally, in the Southern African Development Community (SADC) and in Africa.

The HSRC also seeks to contribute to the research and development strategy of the HSRC's parent Department of Science and Technology, especially through its mission to focus on the contribution of science and technology to addressing poverty.

The HSRC originates in the National Bureau of Education and Social Research (founded in 1929). In recent years the HSRC has undergone major restructuring, aligning its research activities and structures to South Africa's national development priorities: notably poverty reduction through economic development, skills enhancement, job creation, the elimination of discrimination and inequalities, and effective service delivery. In essence, the HSRC is looking at the following broad dimensions of Poverty, Inequality and Inclusive Development under the following banners, which are:

- Economic Inclusion: including growth, competitiveness, regional integration, infrastructure, technological innovation ICT, resources (natural, human, land), labour markets and spatial dynamics (urbanisation, agglomeration, density);
- Social Development: including well-being (quality of life, security, social and spatial mobility, migration), human capabilities (education, skills, health, etc.), social relationships (race, class, gender, identity, etc.), social institutions and cohesion (family, community, etc.);
- Governance and Decision-making: including political participation, democracy, trust-building, nurturing legitimacy in public structures, capacity-building in the state, enhancing leadership, distributing power, accountability, responsiveness, social movements, multi-level government and coordinated decision-making.

== Organisation ==
It currently comprises more than 200 researchers and 250 support staff in five different locations, across several multi-disciplinary research programmes, namely:

- Africa Institute of South Africa (AISA)
- BRICS Research Centre (BRC)
- Centre for Science, Technology and Innovation Indicators (CeSTII)
- Democracy, Governance and Service Delivery (DGSD)
- Economic and Performance Development (EPD)
- Education and Skills Development (ESD)
- HIV/AIDS, STI's and TB (HAST)
- Human and Social Development (HSD)
- Population Health, Health Systems and Innovation (PHHSI)
- Research Use and Impact Assessment (RIA)

The HSRC is a statutory body which was established in 1968; its current CEO is Prof. Crain Soudien. The HSRC's scholarly publisher, the HSRC Press, is South Africa's largest academic publisher focused on social sciences and humanities.

== Notable researchers ==
- Adam Habib, former Executive Director: DGSD, former Vice-Chancellor at University of the Witwatersrand
- Thierry Luescher, current Research Director: ESD, NRF-rated researcher
- Leickness Simbayi, current Deputy CEO of the HSRC, NRF-rated researcher
- Crain Soudien, Emeritus Professor in Education and African Studies, former Deputy Vice-chancellor: University of Cape Town, previous CEO of the HSRC, NRF-rated researcher

== See also ==
- Department of Science and Technology (South Africa)
- National Research Foundation of South Africa
