= Wing On Lee =

Wing On Lee is a Hong Kong-born scholar and professor of comparative education who has held senior academic and administrative roles in Hong Kong, Singapore, Australia, and China. He served as Chair Professor of Education University of Hong Kong, Professor of Education at the University of Sydney, and Professor at the Singapore University of Social Sciences. His administrative roles include Vice President of the Hong Kong Institute of Education and the Open University of Hong Kong and Dean of Education Research at the National Institute of Education in Singapore.

He is former President of the World Council of Comparative Education Societies (WCCES) and has been involved in global education policy through appointments with UNESCO and the German Federal Institute for Vocational Education and Training. Lee has authored and co-authored over 40 books and 200 scholarly articles and chapters. He was also awarded the Medal of Honour by the Government of Hong Kong in 2003 in recognition of his contributions to citizenship education.

== Early life and education ==
Lee began his career as a schoolteacher in Hong Kong before pursuing higher education abroad. He obtained a Bachelor of Arts with Honours from the University of Hong Kong, followed by a Doctor of Philosophy (PhD) from Durham University in the United Kingdom.

== Career ==
Lee began his academic career at the University of Hong Kong, where he founded the Comparative Education Research Centre in 1994 and served as its first president. He contributed to the establishment of the Comparative Education Society of Asia in 1995 and launched Hong Kong's first postgraduate programmes in values education and comparative education. During his time at the Hong Kong Institute of Education, he served as Vice President (Academic) and later Acting President, contributing to institutional developments including the Centre for Citizenship Education and the Hong Kong Museum of Education.

In 2003, Lee was awarded the Medal of Honour by the Government of Hong Kong in recognition of his contributions to citizenship education.

Between 2005 and 2007, Lee was full professor and international director at the University of Sydney. From 2010 to 2014, he was Dean of Education Research at Singapore's National Institute of Education, and from 2014 to 2017, he served as vice president and Chair Professor of Comparative Education at the Open University of Hong Kong.

He was president of the World Council of Comparative Education Societies from 2010 to 2013.

In 2010, Lee received the Hong Kong Soka Gakkai International Award in recognition of his work in values education.

From 2019 to 2023, Lee held the position of executive director at the Institute for Adult Learning under the Singapore University of Social Sciences, where he led national initiatives in adult learning and the development of the Training and Adult Education (TAE) Sector. He also held the title of Distinguished Professor at Zhengzhou University in China, where he established two research centres on comparative and regional education.

== Research and contributions ==
Lee's research focuses on comparative education, citizenship education, values education, and lifelong learning. His work has contributed to the development of civic and moral education in Asia, with particular attention to curriculum design, policy formation, and multicultural citizenship.

He has written on the role of education in shaping social cohesion and national identity, particularly in the context of globalization and educational reform. His co-edited volumes, such as Citizenship Education in Asia: Concepts and Issues and the Pacific and Citizenship Pedagogies in Asia and the Pacific, are well cited in the fields of curriculum studies and global education policy.

In Singapore, as Executive Director of the Institute for Adult Learning, Lee led initiatives related to adult learning technologies, workplace learning, and professional development frameworks for adult educators. These efforts supported national lifelong learning strategies and workforce development goals. The Institute was recognized as the National Centre of Excellence for Adult Learning in 2022 to drive innovation and technology adoption for the TAE Sector.

Lee's publications include over 200 journal articles and book chapters, with citations in areas spanning educational reform, comparative policy analysis, and teacher education.

== Honours and recognition ==
- In 2003, Lee was awarded the Medal of Honour by the Government of Hong Kong in recognition of his contributions to citizenship education.
- In 2010, he received the Soka Gakkai International Award for his work in peace and environmental education.
- In 2021, he received the Ming Yuan Education Award in recognition of his international contribution to Chinese educational research from Beijing Normal University.
- In 2022, Lee was inducted into the International Adult and Continuing Education (IACE) Hall of Fame, acknowledging his leadership in adult learning policy, research, and international education collaboration.
- In 2022, Lee was appointed to the Governing Board of the UNESCO Asia-Pacific Centre of Education for International Understanding (APCEIU), South Korea.
- In 2024, "A Tribute to Wing On Lee" was published in the Nordic Journal of Comparative and International Education.
- In 2026, Lee was elected to the Board of Directors of the International Adult and Continuing Education (IACE) Hall of Fame.

== Selected works ==
- Social Change and Educational Problems in Japan, Singapore and Hong Kong (1991). London: Macmillan / New York: St. Martin's Press. ISBN 978-0-230-37906-0
- Citizenship Education in Asia and the Pacific: Concepts and Issues. Dordrecht: Kluwer. Lee, W.O., Grossman, D., Kennedy, K.J., Fairbrother, G. (Eds.). (2004). ISBN 978-962-8093-59-5.
- Education for Social Citizenship: Perceptions of Teachers in the USA, Australia, England, Russia and China. Hong Kong: Hong Kong University Press. Lee, W.O., Fouts, J. (Eds.). (2005). ISBN 978-962-209-728-5.
- Citizenship Curriculum in Asia and the Pacific. Dordrecht: Springer. Grossman, D., Lee, W.O., Kennedy, K.J. (Eds.). (2008). ISBN 978-962-8093-69-4.
- Citizenship Pedagogies in Asia and the Pacific. Dordrecht: Springer. Kennedy, K.J., Lee, W. O., Grossman, D. (Eds.). (2011).
- Educational Policy Innovations: Levelling Up and Sustaining Educational Achievement. Dordrecht: Springer. Lee, S.K., Lee, W.O., Low, E.L. (Eds.). (2013). ISBN 978-981-4560-08-5.
- Lifelong Learning and Learning to Learn: An Enabler of New Voices for the New Times (2014).
- Third International Handbook of Lifelong Learning. Dordrecht: Springer. Evans, K., Lee, W.O., Markowitsch, J., Zukas, M. (Eds.). (2023). ISBN 978-3-031-19591-4.
- International Handbook on Education Development in the Asia-Pacific. Dordrecht: Springer. Lee, W.O. Brown, P., Goodwin, A.L., Green, A. (Eds.). (2023). ISBN 978-981-19-6886-0.
- Making Employee-Driven Innovation Achievable: Approaches and Practices for Workplace Learning. Singapore: Routledge. Tan, J., Lee, W.O. (Eds.). (2024). ISBN 978-1-032-13180-1.
- A Modern Guide to Education in East Asia: Globalization and Local Intersections. Lee, W.O., Kester, K., Eom, J. (Eds.). (2026). Cheltenham: Edward Elgar Publishing. ISBN 978-1-0353-3788-0.
