= Comparative and International Education Society =

Scholarly research organization

Comparative and International Education Society (CIES)
- Formation: 1956
- Headquarters: Pittsburgh, PA
- President: Kazuo KURODA, Waseda University
- Executive Director: M. Najeeb Shafiq, University of Pittsburgh
- Website: cies.us

The Comparative and International Education Society (CIES, pronounced "C-I-E-S") is a professional scholarly research organization representing over 4000 education researchers, policymakers, practitioners and students. Based in the United States, and hosting an annual conference as well as issuing several publications, CIES aims to encourage and promote comparative and international education and related areas of inquiry and activity.

== Organization and governance ==
CIES has 37 Special Interest Groups (SIGs) that represent topical and geographic areas. SIGs were introduced by the Society in 2005 and many are now active in organizing events throughout the year, as well as at the Society's annual conference. CIES is governed by a Board of Directors elected by its membership. Its governance structure includes a number of Standing Committees such as a Gender and Education Committee (GEC) established in 1989; an Under-represented Racial, Ethnic, and Ability Groups (UREAG) committee; and, since 1991, a New Scholars Committee (NSC). In 2020 CIES created a Social and Policy Engagement Committee (SPEC).

== Early history ==
CIES evolved out of annual conferences held at New York University under the leadership of William W. Brickman and was formally chartered in 1956. From the start it drew its membership from the United States and internationally. The first Board of Directors consisted of university professors as well as Bess Goodykoontz, the director of the International Education division of the United States Office of Education.

The Society began as the "Comparative Education Society" and was initially a branch of the National Society of College Teachers of Education (NSCTE), which itself was chartered in 1902 as the Society of College Teachers of Education, and has been known since 1969 as the Society of Professors of Education. In its early years, in addition to holding annual meetings, it organized educational study tours, and in 1957 founded a journal, the Comparative Education Review. In 1968 the Society formally changed its name to the "Comparative and International Education Society". After initially meeting jointly with the NSCTE, in 1970 CIES held its first independent annual meeting.

CIES was a founding member of the World Council for Comparative Education Societies (WCCES) which held its first conference in Ottawa, Canada in 1970. As the first professional society in the field – and In contrast to the more than 40 WCCES member societies that include a national or regional descriptor as part of their name – CIES has never used a national qualifier to indicate that it is a US-based society.

== Publications and awards ==
In addition to its flagship journal, the Comparative Education Review, CIES has also published a newsletter titled "Prospects" and a monograph book series "Education in Global Perspectives" with SUNY Press. From 1959 to 2015 the Society also published an annual bibliography of research in comparative and international education.

The Society also has a set of annual awards to honor the achievements of its members. These include an award for the best article published in the Comparative Education Review, which since 1989 has been named in honor of George Z. F. Bereday, the journal's first editor and professor at Teachers College, Columbia University; a dissertation award (since 1994) named in honor of Gail P. Kelly, a professor at University at Buffalo; an Honorary Fellows award; as well as a Joyce L. Cain Award (from 2001) to recognize excellent scholarship on educational themes relating to people of African descent and (since 2011) a Jackie Kirk Memorial Award that recognizes a book related to gender and education and/or education in conflict. Additionally, many CIES SIGs also make annual awards.

== Activities ==
CIES holds an annual conference, typically in February or March, attended by 3000–4000 policymakers, practitioners, students and academics. The location shifts from year to year, moving around major US cities and sometimes taking place in Mexico or Canada. This five-day conference showcases comparative and international research and includes participants from around the globe who engage in knowledge exchange and professional development. Conferences have also included pre-conference workshops and an exhibit hall. During the COVID disruptions of 2020 and 2021 the annual conference shifted to being online-only.

During the annual CIES conference the George F. Kneller Lecture is delivered, among various other highlighted panels.

CIES also sponsors regional conferences and has organized topical seminars and workshops.

== Intellectual influences ==
CIES has been characterized by many scholars as eclectic and inclusive in the research methodologies, theoretical frameworks, and academic disciplines that compose its work. In alignment with broader social science trends following World War II, much of the work presented at the Society's early annual meetings and published in its journal concerned the relationship between education and national development. While an appreciation of diversity and a concern not to be Eurocentric characterized the work of many of the Society's founders such as Isaac Leon Kandel, the geopolitical context of the Cold War resulted in a strong commitment to modernization theory. Many early leaders in the field embraced an empirical positivism and orientation to education rooted in structural functionalism.

By the 1970s multiple critical and postfoundational perspectives began to appear in the Society. Individuals and groups engaged with Marxist and Neo-Marxism analyses, represented for example in work dealing with conflict theories and dependency theory. In recent years, just as the field of comparative education has itself evolved, CIES has become a venue for an extremely wide range of disciplinary and epistemic approaches with research perspectives informed by postpositivism, postmodernism, postcolonialism, and feminist theory commonly appearing alongside economics of education, development economics, and more quantitative social research approaches.

== Selected bibliography ==
- Epstein, Erwin (ed.). Crafting a Global Field: Six Decades of the Comparative and International Education Society. Springer / Comparative Education Research Centre The University of Hong Kong. ISBN 978-988-14241-4-3.
- Jacob, W. James, Huiyuan Ye, Shuo Wang, Xueshuang Wang, Xiufang Ma, Abdullah Bagci, Quan Gu, and Julio Luis Méndez Vergara (2019). "The History of Comparative and International Education in North America." In Wolhuter, Charl Coetzee, and Alexander W. Wiseman, eds. Comparative and international education: Survey of an infinite field. Emerald Publishing Limited. pp. 101-117. ISBN 978-1-78743-392-2
- Manzon, Maria (2011). Comparative Education: The Construction of a Field. Springer / Comparative Education Research Centre The University of Hong Kong. p. 76. ISBN 978-988-17852-6-8.
- Sherman Swing, Elizabeth (2006). "A Brief History of the Comparative and International Education Society". Current Issues in Comparative Education. 8 (2).
- Sherman Swing, Elizabeth (2007). "The Comparative and International Education Society (CIES)". In Masemann, Vandra; Bray, Mark; Manzon, Maria (eds.). Common Interests, Uncommon Goals: Histories of the World Council of Comparative Education Societies and its Members. Springer / Comparative Education Research Center The University of Hong Kong. pp. 94–115. ISBN 978 962 8093 10 6.
