= Gita Steiner-Khamsi =

International education policy academic

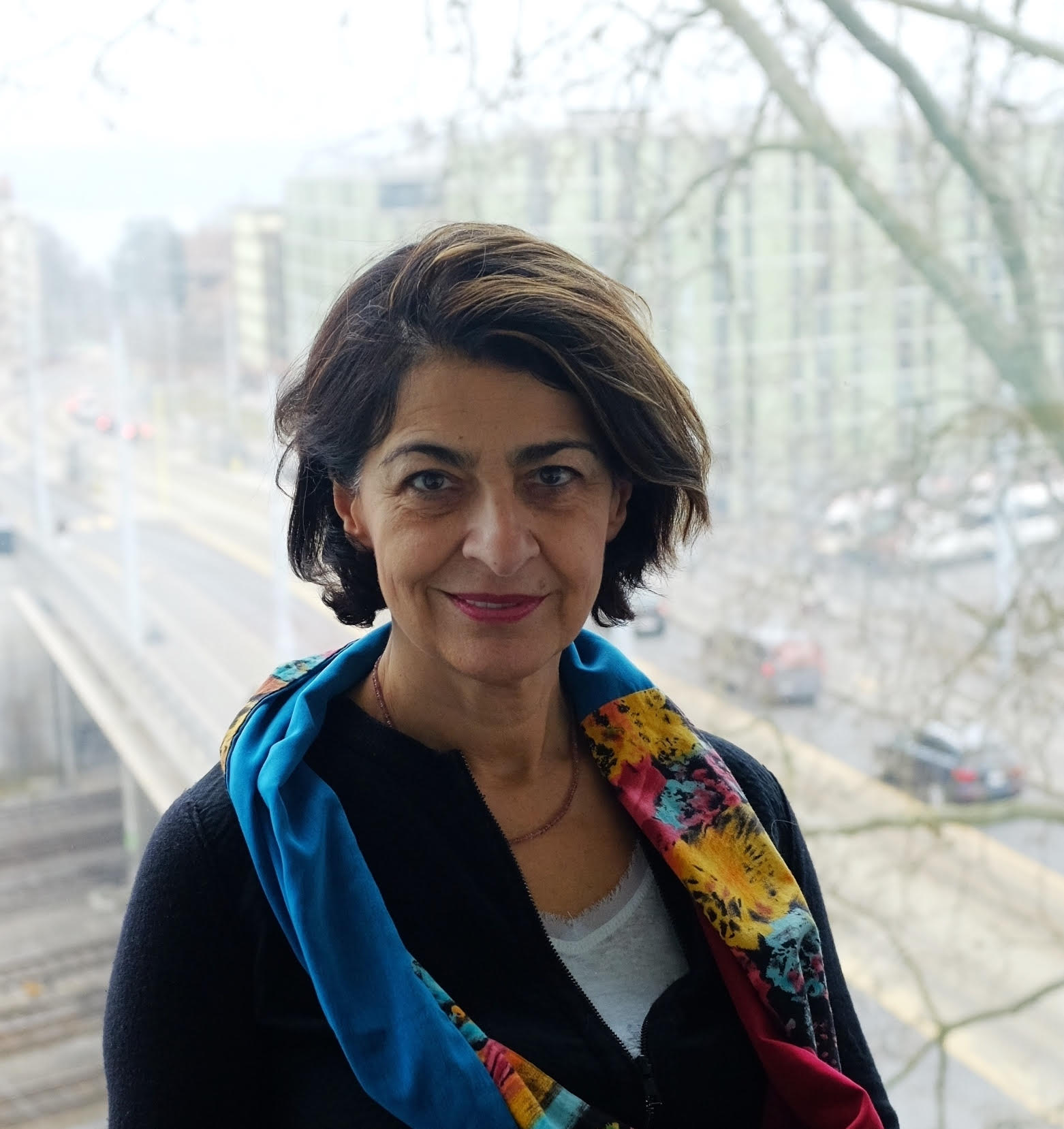
- Occupations: Academic; Professor
- Known for: Her work in policy borrowing and policy transfer

Academic work
- Institutions: Columbia University (1995 - present), Graduate Institute of International and Development Studies (2017-present)
- Main interests: Comparative policy studies; Development studies; Globalization studies in education
- Website: https://www.gitasteinerkhamsi.org

Gita Steiner-Khamsi is the William Heard Kilpatrick Professor of Comparative Education at Teachers College and the Graduate School of Arts and Sciences, Columbia University in New York, USA, and the UNESCO Chair of Comparative Education Policy at the Geneva Graduate Institute of International and Development Studies, Geneva, Switzerland.

She is well cited for her work in the field of comparative and international education, in particular, policy transfer and globalization studies.

== Biography and career ==
She completed her graduate studies at the University of Zurich with a major in psychology and minors in sociology and anthropology. In 1983, she earned her Ph.D. (Dr. phil.) in social psychology from the University of Zurich. During her studies, she completed three rounds of summer schools in social science data analysis, organized by the European Consortium for Political Research and hosted by the University of Essex, UK. In 2004, the Mongolian State University of Education in Ulaanbaatar awarded her a doctorate honoris causa.

Prior to her academic career, from 1979 to 1988, she established and directed the section Multicultural Education Policy at the Research & Development Unit of the Ministry of Education, Canton of Zurich, Switzerland. She left her position as government official because she was granted a 3-year Fellowship for Advanced Researchers, funded by the Swiss National Science Foundation, to study multicultural and anti-racist education policies from an international comparative perspective. In addition to grants from the Swiss National Science Foundation, she was awarded the DAAD Visiting Professorship at Humboldt University of Berlin (2 full academic years), the German Mercator Fellowship on International Affairs in the research project “The global development, diffusion, and transformation of education systems” at the University of Bremen (2 summer terms), the North America – Norway mobility grant (4 years), and is part of the research leadership team for the 5-year research project “Policy knowledge and lesson drawing in Nordic school reform in an era of international comparison” at the University of Oslo, funded by the Research Council of Norway. She has taught—for one semester or more—as a visiting professor at Aarhus University in Copenhagen, Humboldt University of Berlin, Institute of Education - University College London, Stanford University School of Education, and the University of Oslo.

== Work ==
During her first line of research in comparative multicultural education policies, she noticed that similar school reforms “travel” from one country to another. Even though these reforms often carry the same label, they are adopted for different reasons and are adapted to the varied national contexts in vastly differed ways. Her comparative study of multicultural and anti-racist education policies in the UK, USA, and Canada, constituted the foundation for her later in-depth investigation of transnational policy transfer, policy borrowing and globalization in education systems.

Her focus is on the local reception and translation processes of global education policies. In her research of policy transfer in educational systems of Europe, Central Asia, and Mongolia, she examines the politics and economics of policy “import.” At center stage are the questions of why and when global education policies are adopted, how they are translated into a local context, and which interest groups or organizations lose or gain power, respectively, as a result of a policy transfer process.

Conceptionally, her work is inspired by Niklas Luhmann’s sociological systems theory. She applies system-theoretical key concepts of self-referentiality, externalization and structural coupling to the study of policy transfer, evidence-based policy planning (structural coupling of science and politics), the rise of international large-scale student assessments, and public-private partnerships in education. Her most recent work applies a system-theoretical lens for understanding how policy actors deal with the surplus of global public goods such as international databanks, toolkits, and standards.

Her work is published in Chinese, English, French, German, Italian, Mongolian, and Spanish.

== Professionalization of comparative and international education ==
Over the course of her career, she helped advance comparative and international education as a profession as well as a field of research and study that has its own professional association, peer-reviewed journals, book series, scholarship and graduate degree programs. In this vein, she produced two oral history videos on the field, entitled Comparatively Speaking I and Comparatively Speaking II. She and Sina Mossayeb are the founding editors of CIEclopedia - Who’s Who in Comparative and International Education Studies. She is a past president of the Comparative and International Education Society and a past co-editor of the World Yearbook of Education (2008 – 2021). She is an editor of two book series related to comparative and international education, one published by Teachers College Press and another open-access series published with E. Elgar.

== Selected articles ==
Steiner-Khamsi, G., Martens, K., & Ydesen, C. (2024). Governance by numbers 2.0: policy brokerage as an instrument of global governance in the era of information overload. Comparative Education, 60(4), 537–554. https://doi.org/10.1080/03050068.2024.2308348.

Seitzer, H., Baek, C. & Steiner-Khamsi, G. (2023). Instruments of Lesson-Drawing: Comparing the Knowledge Brokerage of the OECD and the World Bank. Policy Studies, 45(6), 839–859. https://doi.org/10.1080/01442872.2023.2220282.

Steiner-Khamsi, G. (2021). Externalisation and structural coupling: Applications in comparative policy studies in education. European Educational Research Journal.

Liu, J. and Steiner-Khamsi, G. (2020). Human Capital Index and the Hidden Penalty for Non-Participation in ILSAs. International Journal of Educational Development, 73, 102-149.

Steiner-Khamsi, G., Karseth, B. and Baek, C. (2019). From science to politics: commissioned reports and their political translation into White Papers. Journal of Education Policy, 35 (1), 119-144.

Verger, A., Steiner-Khamsi, G. and Lubienski, C. (2017). The Emerging Global Education Industry: Analyzing market-making in education through market sociology. Globalisation, Societies and Education, 15 (3), 325-340.

Cardoso, M. and Steiner-Khamsi, G. (2017). The Making of Comparability: Education indicator research from Jullien de Paris to the 2030 Sustainable Development Goals. Compare, 47 (3), 388 – 405.

Addey, C., Sellar, S., Steiner-Khamsi, G., Lingard, B. and Verger, A. (2017). Forum discussion: The rise of international large-scale assessments and rationales for participation. Compare, 47 (3), 434 – 452.

Steiner-Khamsi, G. (2016). New Directions in Policy Borrowing Research. Asia Pacific Educational Review, 17 (2), 381 – 390.

Steiner-Khamsi, G. (2014). Cross-national policy borrowing: understanding reception and translation. Asia Pacific Journal of Education, 34 (2), 153-167.

Steiner-Khamsi, G. (2013). What is Wrong with the “What-Went-Right” Approach in Educational Policy? European Educational Research Journal, 12 (1), 20-33.

Steiner-Khamsi, G. (2012). The global/local nexus in comparative policy studies: analysing the triple bonus system in Mongolia over time. Comparative Education, 48 (4), 455-471.

== Books ==
Steiner-Khamsi, G., P. Bromley, R. Kijima, K. Martens & A. Verger. (2026). Data for Accountability in Education: Global Trends in School Reform. NORRAG Series on International Education and Development. E. Elgar. Open access: https://doi.org/10.4337/9781035349869.

Steiner-Khamsi, G. (2025). Time in education policy transfer. The seven temporalities of global school reform. New York: Palgrave. Open access: https://link.springer.com/book/10.1007/978-3-031-82524-8.

Baek, C. and Steiner-Khamsi, G., eds. (2024). The rise of knowledge brokers in global education governance. Cheltenham, UK: E. Elgar. Open access: https://doi.org/10.4337/9781035326426.00013.

Karseth, B., Sivesind, K. and Steiner-Khamsi, G., eds (2021). Evidence and Expertise in Nordic Education Policies: A Comparative Network Analysis from the Nordic Region. New York: Palgrave.

Gorur, R., Sellar, S. and Steiner-Khamsi, G., eds. (2019). Comparative methodology in an era of big data and global networks. World Yearbook of Education 2019. London and New York: Routledge.

Waldow, F. and Steiner-Khamsi, G., eds. (2019). Understanding PISA’s Attractiveness: Critical Analyses in Comparative Policy Studies. London: Bloomsbury.

Parreira do Amaral, M., Steiner-Khamsi, G. and Thompson, C., eds. (2018). Researching the global education industry. New York: Palgrave.

Steiner-Khamsi, G. and Draxler, A., eds. (2018). The state, business, and education: Public-private partnerships revisited. Cheltenham, UK: E. Elgar.

Verger, A., Lubienski, C. & Steiner-Khamsi, G., eds (2016). The Global Education Industry. World Yearbook of Education 2016. London and New York: Routledge.

Steiner-Khamsi, G. Waldow, F., eds (2012). Policy Borrowing and Lending. World Yearbook of Education 2012. London and New York: Routledge.

Chisholm, L. and Steiner-Khamsi, G., eds (2009). South-South Cooperation in Education and Development. New York and Cape Town, South Africa: Teachers College Press and HRSC Press.

Silova, I. and Steiner-Khamsi, G., eds (2008). How NGOs React. Globalization and Education Reform in the Caucasus, Central Asia and Mongolia. Boulder, CO: Kumarian Press/Lynne Rienner.

Steiner-Khamsi, G. & Stolpe, I. (2006). Educational Import in Mongolia: Local Encounters with Global Forces. New York: Palgrave Macmillan (Mongolian translation published by Admon Press, Ulaanbaatar).

Steiner-Khamsi, G., ed. (2004). The Global Politics of Educational Borrowing and Lending. New York: Teachers College Press.

Steiner-Khamsi, G., Torney-Purta, J. and Schwille, J. eds (2002). New Paradigms and Recurring Paradoxes in Education for Citizenship: An International Comparison. Oxford: Elsevier Science.

Steiner-Khamsi, G. (1992). Multikulturelle Bildungspolitik in der Postmoderne [Multicultural Education Policy in Postmodernity]. Opladen: Leske & Budrich.
