= International Society for Comparative Adult Education =

Comparative education

The International Society for Comparative Adult Education (or ISCAE) is a network of individuals and organizations with members in more than thirty countries.

== Purpose ==
Comparative education is a well-established field of study that examines education in one country (or group of countries) by using data and insights drawn from the practices and situation in another country or countries. Adult education focuses on the unique needs and characteristics of students who are not children or adolescents. The focus of ISCAE then is the study of the education of adults as practiced in various countries; it also explores the methods, problems and pitfalls of international comparative research in general.

ISCAE serves as a network of contacts for professionals in the field of comparative adult education; such networking encourages research assistance and cross-fertilization, exchange of information, international cooperation, and similar activities. There are no statutes and no membership fees. Most of the printing and distribution of newsletters and conference proceedings is done by members from the United States, Germany, or Australia.

== History ==
ISCAE's origins can be traced back to 1960, when Dr. Alexander N. Charters, professor of adult education at Syracuse University, and Canadian scholar of adult education J. Roby Kidd formed a working group on international and comparative adult education at the first world conference of the World Council for Comparative Education in Ottawa. They named their group the Committee for Study and Research in Comparative Adult Education (CSRCAE).

The growing International interest in comparative adult education led, in 1992, to a restructuring with a new board and a new president: Jost Reischmann, Chair of Andragogy at Bamberg University, Germany), and to a renaming into "International Society for Comparative Adult Education ISCAE". The upcoming new Internet-technology with an homepage and a mailing list allowed much easier and faster communication and access for scholars from many countries around the globe. These new developments and the conferences increased the number of members from about 50 in 1992 to 250 in 2012. In 2009 Michal Bron Jr, Assoc. Professor Södertörn University, Sweden became new president.

== Publications and meetings ==
ISCAE publishes a newsletter, ISCAE-Communication, irregularly (once or twice a year). Members meet at international conferences, held every three or four years in locations around the world: in Bamberg, Germany 1995, Radovljica, Slovenia 1998, St. Louis, Mo, USA 2002, Bamberg, Germany 2006, Las Vegas, USA 2012. At the conferences, individuals present papers on completed (or nearly complete) research; others present research in progress or ideas for future research. Studies must include two or more countries in the research in order to qualify as "comparative." ISCAE published two volumes with papers from their conferences:

Comparative Adult Education 1998. The contribution of ISCAE to an emerging field of study. Eds. Jost Reischmann, Michal Bron Jr & Zoran Jelenc, Ljubljana 1999, ISCAE & SIAE. ISBN 961-6130-27-7 Download.

Comparative Adult Education 2008. Experiences and examples. Eds. Jost Reischmann & Michal Bron Jr. Frankfurt am Main, 2008, Peter Lang Verlag. ISBN 978-3-631-58235-0. Download of Volume's table of content/introduction.
