= Isaac Leon Kandel =

American educator (1881–1965)

Isaac Leon Kandel, M.A., Ph.D. (1881-1965) was an American educator born in Botoșani, Romania. He studied at Manchester, England, Teachers College, Columbia University, and the University of Jena, (Germany). For several years, he taught at schools in Ireland, then became a scholar and teaching professor at Columbia (1908–10).

In 1914, Professor Kandel became a specialist of the Carnegie Foundation for the Advancement of Teaching. He was a contributor to several encyclopedias, and the author of a number of books.

== Books ==
- Elementary Education in England (1914)
- Federal Aid for Vocational Education (1917)
- Education in Germany (1918)
- Reports on Education in Great Britain, Ireland, Germany and France (1919)

== Bibliography ==
- Encyclopaedia Judaica
- Oxford Dictionary of National Biography
- For the definitive biography of Kandel, see J. Wesley Null, Peerless Educator: The Life and Work of Isaac Leon Kandel (New York Peter Lang, 2007).
- For an anthology that includes many of Kandel's published writings, see J. Wesley Null and Diane Ravitch, Forgotten Heroes of American Education: The Great Tradition of Teaching Teachers (Greenwich, CT: Information Age Publishing, 2006).
