= Mark Bray =

Hong Kong academic

Mark Bray is the Chair Professor of Comparative Education in the Comparative Education Research Centre (CERC) at the University of Hong Kong.

He has researched and published about the study of comparative education in areas including policy-making, financing and planning of education systems. Prior to returning to his post at the University of Hong Kong, Bray was the Director of the UNESCO International Institute for Educational Planning (IIEP) from 2006 to 2010. Bray has taught at universities in Hong Kong, Edinburgh, Papua New Guinea and London. He has also taught in secondary schools in Kenya and Nigeria. Bray has consulted and advised in over 60 countries in Europe, North America, Africa, the Caribbean, Asia, and the South Pacific.

== Professional roles ==
Bray has held active responsibilities at the following organisations.

=== Direct positions ===
- University of Hong Kong since 1986 [Chair Professor since 1999;Dean of Faculty of Education, 2002-2006]
- UNESCO-IIEP - Director [2006-2010]
- The World Bank- Research Fellow
- University of London Institute of Education- Lecturer
- University of Papua New Guinea- Senior Lecturer
- University of Edinburgh, UK- Lecturer
- Federal Government College, Nigeria- Lecturer
- Kwara State, Nigeria: secondary school teacher
- Central Province, Kenya: secondary school teacher

=== Other roles ===
- World Council of Comparative Education Societies (WCCES)- President 2004–07; Secretary General 2000–05; Assistant Secretary General 1994–2000.

=== Associations ===
Bray is member of the academic associations as below:

- British Association for International and Comparative Education- Member
- Comparative and International Education Society- Board of Directors
- Comparative Education Society of Asia- Board of Directors
- Comparative Education Society of Hong Kong- President/Executive Committee
- Comparative Education Society in Europe- Member

== Active research ==
- Education and Political Transition- The forces shaping education systems in East Asia are being investigated in a comparative context. Particular focus is being devoted to Hong Kong and Macau.
- Education Systems in Small States- This project examines the distinctive features of education in small states. It mainly focuses on 28 Commonwealth countries with populations below 1.5 million.
- Financing of Education- The research focuses on the costs and financing of education at all levels (pre-primary to tertiary) and from all sources (government and non-government). Particular attention is given to household and community financing of education, including the costs of supplementary private tutoring. The research also considers the parameters and consequences of privatisation of education.
- Theory and Methodology in Comparative Education- The research considers the nature of comparative education, and different methodological approaches. It explores the particular contributions that are being made by scholars in the Asian Region.

== Academic qualifications ==
- B.A. (Hons) Economic Studies, University of Newcastle upon Tyne, UK
- M.Sc. African Studies, University of Edinburgh, UK
- Ph.D. Education, University of Edinburgh, UK

== Publications ==
Professor Bray has over 45 books/monographs, over 120 articles, and 80 chapters.

=== 2009 ===
- Confronting the Shadow Education System: What Government Policies for What Private Tutoring?- PDF Paris: UNESCO International Institute for Educational Planning (IIEP)
