= British Association for International and Comparative Education =

UK learned society

The British Association for International and Comparative Education (BAICE) is a learned society in the United Kingdom dedicated to promoting teaching, research, policy and development in all aspects of international and comparative education. It is a member of the Academy of Social Sciences. The association runs an academic journal, Compare.

The current Chair of BAICE is Professor Alison Buckler from the Open University, the Vice Chair is Professor Namrata Rao (Liverpool Hope University), and the Secretary is Dr Jennifer Jomafuvwe Agbaire (Open University). The current President of BAICE is Professor Tejendra Pherali from the Institute of Education, UCL.
