= Comparative Education Review =

Academic journal

- Discipline: Education
- Language: English
- Edited by: Tavis D. Jules & Florin D. Salajan

Publication details
- History: 1957–present
- Publisher: University of Chicago Press for the Comparative and International Education Society (United States)
- Frequency: Quarterly
- Impact factor: 2.0 (2023)

Standard abbreviations
- ISO 4: Comp. Educ. Rev.

Indexing
- ISSN: 0010-4086

Links
- Journal homepage

Comparative Education Review is the official publication of the Comparative and International Education Society. It publishes research that investigates education throughout the world and the social, economic, and political forces that shape it.
