= Donald Trump sexual misconduct allegations =

As of October 2024, since the 1970s, at least 28 women have publicly accused Donald Trump, the 45th and 47th president of the United States, of sexual misconduct. These accusations include rape, sexual assault, sex with minors, physical abuse, kissing and groping without consent, looking under women's skirts, and walking in on naked pageant contestants.

In 2023, a jury in a New York civil trial found Trump liable for the sexual abuse and defamation of writer E. Jean Carroll, awarding her $5 million in damages. The jury did not find him liable for rape but the presiding judge later said that the jury’s finding of sexual abuse met the common definition of rape. In a subsequent 2024 civil trial, Trump was again found liable for defamation of Carroll and ordered to pay her an additional $83.3 million.

Beyond the Carroll case, several other women have filed lawsuits against Trump, including his former wife Ivana Trump, who alleged a 'violent assault' during their 1990 divorce (which she later withdrew), and businesswoman Jill Harth, who sued in 1997 alleging sexual harassment and assault. Other notable litigants include former Apprentice contestant Summer Zervos and campaign staffer Alva Johnson, both of whom filed suits that were later withdrawn or dismissed.

Following Trump's 2024 re-election, and the passage of the Epstein Files Transparency Act that led to the release of the Epstein Files in late-2025 and early 2026, it was revealed that the FBI had conducted secret investigations into Trump's ties to Epstein dating back to the 1990s. The files included several unverified tips to the FBI National Threat Operations Center (NTOC) regarding alleged misconduct and trafficking involving Trump and Jeffrey Epstein, including a 1990 oral rape allegation, which resulted in multiple FBI interviews with the accuser, and a 1995 report from a limousine driver alleging that Trump had discussed abusing a girl with Epstein.

In 2005, Trump told Howard Stern on his radio show that "he got away with going backstage when the contestants were naked" at beauty pageants. In October 2016, two days before the second presidential debate with Hillary Clinton, a 2005 "hot mic" recording surfaced in which Trump was heard saying "You know I'm automatically attracted to beautiful—I just start kissing them. It's like a magnet. Just kiss. I don't even wait. And when you're a star, they let you do it, you can do anything ... grab them by the pussy." The incident's widespread media exposure led to Trump's first public apology during the campaign, and caused outrage across the political spectrum.

== Overview ==
Donald Trump has been accused of rape, sexual assault, and sexual harassment, including non-consensual kissing or groping, by at least 28 women since the 1970s. (Note: Attributed to multiple sources:)

In June 2019, writer E. Jean Carroll alleged in New York magazine that Trump raped her in a department store dressing room in 1995 or 1996. Two friends of Carroll stated that Carroll had previously confided in them about the incident. In November 2019, Carroll filed a defamation lawsuit against Trump. Trump called the allegation fiction and denied ever meeting Carroll, despite a photo showing them together at a party in 1987 which was published by the magazine.

In November 2022, Carroll sued Trump for battery under the Adult Survivors Act. On May 9, 2023, a New York jury in a civil case found Trump liable for sexual abuse and defamation against Carroll, but found him not liable for rape. They awarded Carroll US $5 million in damages. In July 2023, Judge Kaplan stated that the jury had found that Trump had raped Carroll according to the common definition of the word, as they had ruled that Trump had forcibly and nonconsensually penetrated Carroll's vagina with his fingers. New York State law at the time defined rape as solely nonconsensual penetration of the vagina by a penis. A September 2023 partial summary judgment found Trump liable for again defaming Carroll. On January 26, 2024, Trump was ordered to pay Carroll an additional $83.3 million in damages.

Other litigation includes his then-wife Ivana's rape claim during their 1990 divorce (she later recanted); businesswoman Jill Harth's 1997 lawsuit alleging breach of contract and sexual harassment (she settled the former claim and forfeited the latter); and former Apprentice contestant Summer Zervos's claim of sexual misconduct, followed by a 2017 defamation lawsuit after Trump accused her of lying (she withdrew her defamation case in 2021).

The allegations by Ivana Trump and Jill Harth became public before Trump's presidential candidacy with the rest going public after the 2005 Access Hollywood tape was leaked during the 2016 presidential campaign in which Trump was recorded bragging that a celebrity like himself "can do anything" to women, including "just start kissing them ... I don't even wait" and "grab 'em by the pussy". Trump denied behaving that way toward women and apologized for the crude language. Many of his accusers stated that Trump's denials provoked them into going public.

Several former Miss USA and Miss Teen USA contestants accused Trump of entering the dressing rooms of beauty pageant contestants while contestants were in various stages of undress. Trump had already referred to this practice during a 2005 interview on The Howard Stern Show, saying he could "get away with things like that" because he owned the Miss Universe franchise. In October 2019, the book All the President's Women: Donald Trump and the Making of a Predator (Note: The title is a reference to the 1974 book All the President's Men, about former President Richard Nixon's inner circle and their attempts to protect him during the Watergate scandal which led to his impeachment and resignation.) contained 43 additional allegations of sexual misconduct against Trump.

In 2025, Trump's past friendship with Jeffrey Epstein received significant media attention following his administration's refusal to release files relating to Epstein, despite Trump's 2024 election campaign promises to do so. In response to the passage of the Epstein Files Transparency Act, the files were eventually released, except that they "failed to include some key materials related to a woman who made an accusation against President Trump, according to a review by The New York Times". The files that were released revealed other accounts of Trump's alleged sexual misconduct that were investigated by the FBI.

In 2026, the DOJ released FBI files detailing several severe, though largely unverified, tips made to the National Threat Operations Center (NTOC) regarding alleged sexual misconduct and trafficking by Donald Trump, often involving Jeffrey Epstein. One specific 1990 allegation of assault resulted in multiple FBI interviews with the accuser. Although some interview summaries and details have been released to the public, records show that certain pages and files regarding these investigations remain redacted or unreleased. Other files also revealed that the FBI had in fact secretly investigated Epstein-related allegations against Trump.

Trump has a history of insulting and belittling women when speaking to the media and on social media, and has made lewd and suggestive comments about women (including his daughter Ivanka), disparaged their physical appearance, and referred to them using derogatory epithets.

Trump has denied all the allegations against him, saying he has been the victim of media bias, conspiracies, and a political smear campaign. (Note: Attributed to multiple sources:) In October 2016, Trump publicly vowed to sue all the women who have made allegations of sexual misconduct against him, as well as The New York Times for publishing the allegations. As of February 2026, he has only sued one accuser, an unsuccessful counterclaim against Carroll.

== Accusations filed in court against Trump ==
=== Ivana Trump (1989) ===
Ivana Trump and Donald Trump married in 1977. Ivana stated in a deposition taken in 1990, during their divorce proceedings, that Donald had visited her plastic surgeon following which he had expressed anger and ripped out hair from her scalp. Donald said the allegation was "obviously false". The book Lost Tycoon: The Many Lives of Donald Trump (1993), by Harry Hurt III, described the alleged attack as a "violent assault" during which Donald attacked Ivana sexually. According to the book, Ivana later confided to some of her friends that Donald had raped her. In a statement given just before the publication of Hurt's book, and included in the book, Ivana said:

[O]n one occasion during 1989, Mr. Trump and I had marital relations in which he behaved very differently toward me than he had during our marriage. As a woman, I felt violated, as the love and tenderness, which he normally exhibited towards me, was absent. I referred to this as a "rape", but I do not want my words to be interpreted in a literal or criminal sense.

The Trumps' divorce was granted in December 1990 on grounds that Donald's treatment of Ivana, including his affair with Marla Maples, was "cruel and inhuman". According to Donald Trump's lawyer, Jay Goldberg, this was based on Trump's having been seen in public with Marla Maples in 1990. Their settlement (Note: The financial settlement following the Trumps' divorce was made later in 1991.) had a confidentiality clause preventing Ivana from discussing the marriage or the divorce. In 1992, Trump sued Ivana for not honoring a gag clause in their divorce agreement by disclosing facts about him in her best-selling book, and Trump won a gag order.

Years later (after Trump began his presidential campaign), Ivana said she and Donald "are the best of friends". In a July 2015 campaign endorsement, Ivana said: "I have recently read some comments attributed to me from nearly 30 years ago at a time of very high tension during my divorce from Donald. The story is totally without merit."

=== Jill Harth (1992) ===
Jill Harth alleged that Trump assaulted her several times. Harth stated that in December 1992, while dining with Trump and her then-boyfriend George Houraney, Trump attempted to put his hands between her legs. Harth and Houraney visited Trump's Mar-a-Lago estate in Florida in January 1993 for a contract-signing celebration. Trump, according to Harth, offered her a tour before pulling her into the empty bedroom of his daughter Ivanka. "I was admiring the decoration, and next thing I know he's pushing me against a wall and has his hands all over me. He was trying to kiss me. I was freaking out." Harth says she desperately protested against Trump's advances and eventually managed to run out of the room. She and her boyfriend left rather than stay the night, as they had intended. After she became engaged, Harth alleges, Trump began to stalk her.

Harth filed a lawsuit in 1997 in which she accused Trump of non-consensual groping of her body, among them her "intimate private parts", and "relentless" sexual harassment. The suit was withdrawn after Houraney settled with Trump for an undisclosed amount in a lawsuit that stated Trump had backed out of a business deal. She still claims to have been sexually assaulted, and said that his actions were "unwanted and aggressive, very sexually aggressive".

Following the incident, Harth said she received "a couple years of therapy". In 2015, she contacted Trump's campaign to get a job as a makeup artist and sell her men's cosmetic product line. She later said, "Yes, I had moved on but had not forgotten the pain [Trump] brought into my life. I was older, wiser. Trump was married to Melania and I had hoped he was a changed man." She worked at one of Trump's rallies as a makeup artist. Of the experience, she said: "I'm a makeup artist. The guy is a mess, OK? He really needed my services, and I'm a makeup artist that needs a job. Why would, if I was on friendly terms, why wouldn't I try to get that job?"

Harth's lawsuit was first published in February 2016 by LawNewz.com. Her case was first published in May 2016 in The New York Times article "Crossing the Line". Trump characterized her story in the Times as "false, malicious and libelous" and said he "strongly denies the claims". Harth stood by her charges in a July 2016 interview with The Guardian. In October 2016, she said that, if sued by Trump, she intends to counter-sue.

=== Katie Johnson/Jane Doe (1994) ===
In April 2016, an anonymous woman using the pseudonym "Katie Johnson" filed a lawsuit in California accusing both Trump and Jeffrey Epstein of forcibly raping her when she was 13 years old at underage sex parties at Epstein's Manhattan residence in 1994. The case was dismissed the following month. A second version of the lawsuit was filed in New York in June by the same woman as "Jane Doe" claiming to have been raped and sexually assaulted by the pair at four 1994 parties when she was 13. The lawsuit was refiled in September, and on November 2, Doe was scheduled to appear at a press conference at the office of Lisa Bloom before abruptly canceling; Bloom said Jane Doe had received multiple threats.

"I loudly pleaded with Defendant Trump to stop, but he did not," Jane Doe wrote in a formal declaration accompanying her recent suits. "Defendant Trump responded to my pleas by violently striking me in the face with his open hand and screaming that he would do whatever he wanted. ... Immediately following this rape, Defendant Trump threatened me that, were I ever to reveal any of the details of Defendant Trump's sexual and physical abuse of me, my family and I would be physically harmed if not killed."

The lawsuit was withdrawn two days later.

A July investigation by The Guardian said that the lawsuits appeared to be organized by Norm Lubow, "who has been associated in the past with a range of disputed claims involving celebrities including OJ Simpson and Kurt Cobain." Another prominent promoter of Doe's accusation was conservative, Never-Trump activist Steve Baer. Doe identified Trump from his TV show The Apprentice years after the attacks.

Lubow confirmed to Snopes in August 2024 that he played a role in filing the lawsuit and had done so under a false name Al Taylor. According to Snopes, "Lubow's involvement does not disprove that Johnson is a real person, but it does show that those claims were aggressively promoted and aided by someone who has a professional history of using individuals to create fictional salacious drama". Julie K. Brown, Miami Herald journalist said in a 2021 book, that Lisa Bloom had asserted that the unnamed accuser dropped the case on her own accord despite speculation that the lawsuit was dropped due to interference from Trump affiliates, and that the accuser had not contacted Bloom since.

=== E. Jean Carroll (1996) ===
On November 4, 2019, writer E. Jean Carroll filed a lawsuit against Trump, accusing him of defamation by claiming she lied about him raping her in 1995 or 1996. Carroll had first publicly disclosed the alleged sexual assault by Trump in June and said Trump's reaction had directly harmed her career and reputation. Carroll said she was filing this lawsuit on behalf of each woman who has faced harassment, assault, or belittlement. Trump stated that her allegation was a promotion strategy for her book titled What Do We Need Men For? A Modest Proposal, where she discloses details about the alleged assault. The White House Press Secretary responded to the lawsuit claiming it was "frivolous" and that the story was fake, "just like the author".

In September 2020, the Justice Department argued that Trump had acted "within the scope" of the presidency when he called Carroll a liar, moved the case from a state court (which had recently denied Trump's motion to delay the case) to federal court, and sought to take over his defense. During the discovery phase, Trump could have been required to testify and to provide a DNA sample. Attorney general Bill Barr cited the Westfall Act as allowing the Justice Department to defend federal employees against civil liability for acts conducted in the normal course of their duties. Barr stated the White House had requested the Justice Department action and noted that taxpayers would pay any judgment should Carroll win the case. Since government employees largely enjoy immunity from defamation suits, the Justice Department argued that Trump had spoken in his official capacity as president. On October 27, federal judge Lewis Kaplan rejected that argument and allowed the suit to proceed and consider Trump's actions to be by a private citizen—not an officer of a federal agency (as the Justice Department said), as Trump was occupying an office defined in the Constitution, which was a separate category. On November 20, Kaplan ordered Trump's prior private attorneys to resume representing him in the case. On November 25, the Department of Justice appealed Judge Kaplan's ruling in the United States Court of Appeals for the Second Circuit.

In June 2021, the Justice Department argued in a court brief that it should substitute itself as the defendant in the case because Trump had acted as a federal employee.

Carroll filed a second lawsuit against Trump in November 2022 that renewed her claim of defamation due to additional statements Trump made and expanded her claim to battery under the Adult Survivors Act, a New York law that allows sexual-assault victims to file civil suits beyond expired statutes of limitations. The trial for E. Jean Carroll v. Donald J. Trump began on April 25, 2023, in federal court at the United States District Court for the Southern District of New York. On May 9, after deliberating for less than three hours, a jury of six men and three women in Manhattan federal court unanimously found Trump liable for sexually abusing Carroll and defaming her by calling her a liar, rejecting his denial of the allegations, though they did not find Trump liable for rape. The jury awarded Carroll $5 million in compensatory and punitive damages.

A September 2023 partial summary judgment found Trump liable for defaming Carroll through his statements he made in 2019. A trial held January 16–26, 2024 awarded an additional $83.3 million in damages to Carroll.

Trump filed a countersuit against Carroll, but the judge dismissed the case and wrote that Carroll's accusation of "rape" is "substantially true".

The $5 million judgement against Trump "for defamation and sexual abuse" was upheld on appeal by the United States Court of Appeals for the Second Circuit on December 30, 2024, and again on June 13, 2025. The $83.3 million judgment was also upheld by the Second Circuit on September 8, 2025, after Trump's lawyers attempted to argue on grounds of presidential immunity relating to Trump v. United States (2024). Interest is also due on the outstanding amount.

=== Summer Zervos (2007) ===
Summer Zervos was a contestant on the fifth season of The Apprentice, which filmed in 2005 and aired in 2006. (Note: The Associated Press interviewed more than 20 people who had worked on The Apprentice television show for an article. The group included contestants, editors and crew members who described commonly hearing offensive and sexist comments. For instance, Trump talked about which women he wanted to have sex with. The article stated also that he "rated female contestants by the size of their breasts".) Subsequently, she contacted Trump in 2007, about a job after the show's completion, and he invited her to meet him at The Beverly Hills Hotel. Zervos said that Trump was sexually suggestive during their meeting, kissed her open-mouthed, touched her breasts, and thrust his genitals on her. She also said that his behavior was aggressive and not consensual. Zervos was represented by attorney Gloria Allred, and later by Beth Wilkinson and Moira Penza, with whom she chose to end the case in 2021.

John Barry, her cousin and a Trump supporter, has said Zervos talked to her family and friends about Trump, promoting his candidacy and stating how Trump had helped her out in her life. Barry said that during the presidential primary campaign, Zervos invited Trump to her restaurant, and he declined. In October 2016, the Trump presidential campaign released an email by Zervos, sent to Trump's secretary in April 2016, in which she stated: "I would greatly appreciate reconnecting at this time. He will know my intentions are genuine." Zervos said she had intended to confront Trump and give him the "opportunity to clear the air". On April 21, she sent another email to Trump's assistant which she asked to be forwarded to Trump, in which she stated: "I have been incredibly hurt by our previous interaction."

On January 17, 2017, Zervos filed a defamation lawsuit against Trump, arising from his statement that she had lied about the allegations. Marc Kasowitz is defending Trump in the case. Zervos has filed a subpoena for "all documents concerning any woman who asserted that Donald J. Trump touched her inappropriately". On March 21, 2018, a New York Supreme Court judge decided to allow a defamation lawsuit against the President to go forward. On June 4, 2018, Manhattan Supreme Court Justice Jennifer Schecter ruled that Trump must be deposed by January 31, 2019.

As of September 9, 2018, Trump was to provide written answers under oath in the defamation lawsuit.

On March 14, 2019, a New York appeals court rejected President Trump's argument that the Constitution makes him immune from state lawsuits, clearing the way for a defamation suit. On November 2, 2019, Trump agreed to submit to questioning under oath by January 31, 2020.

In January 2020, a New York intermediate appellate court put the defamation lawsuit on hold, until a New York court of appeals could decide the fate of the case. The case hold meant that the January 31, 2020, deadline for Trump to testify was also put on hold.

In February 2021, following Trump's defeat in the 2020 U.S. presidential election, Zervos refiled the lawsuit, arguing that Trump can no longer make the legal argument that presidential immunity protects him from litigation, as he is no longer president. On March 30, 2021, the New York state Court of Appeals ruled in her favor. Trump was instructed to provide a deposition by December 23, 2021. On November 12, Zervos withdrew from the case. Her attorneys said that Trump did not pay her to withdraw and that she "has secured the right to speak freely about her experience".

=== Alva Johnson (2016) ===
On February 25, 2019, Alva Johnson filed a lawsuit against Trump, alleging he had forcibly kissed her at a rally in Florida in August 2016 while she was working on his 2016 presidential campaign. Johnson said two people—including Pam Bondi, then the attorney general of Florida—saw the kiss, but both denied seeing it. According to an interview with Teen Vogue, Johnson decided to stop working for the Trump campaign after the media started covering the Access Hollywood tape. She declared sick days until she could speak to a lawyer. In addition to the "unwanted sexual attention", the lawsuit also alleges that Johnson was "a victim of race and gender discrimination through unequal pay". In response, White House press secretary Sarah Huckabee Sanders called the lawsuit "absurd on its face".

On June 14, 2019, the trial court dismissed the complaint without prejudice to allow Johnson to plead a count for battery without any descriptions of Trump's other alleged acts of sexual battery, and to provide necessary details regarding claims of discrimination. On September 4, 2019, Johnson filed a notice that she was not filing an amended complaint, ending the lawsuit. Johnson decided to drop the lawsuit because she was "facing a judge who openly questions whether the kiss is worthy of a federal lawsuit and has determined that Mr. Trump's history of such behavior is not relevant, and I've endured ongoing threats to my safety."

== The New York Times May 2016 story ==
In May 2016, The New York Times published the article "Crossing the Line: How Donald Trump Behaved with Women in Private". For the article, Times reporters Michael Barbaro and Megan Twohey conducted 50 interviews with women who had known Trump socially, during their professional career, or while modeling or competing for a beauty pageant title.

Their accounts—many relayed here in their own words—reveal unwelcome romantic advances, unending commentary on the female form, a shrewd reliance on ambitious women, and unsettling workplace conduct, according to the interviews, as well as court records and written recollections. The interactions occurred in his offices at Trump Tower, at his homes, at construction sites and backstage at beauty pageants. They appeared to be fleeting, unimportant moments to him, but they left lasting impressions on the women who experienced them.

Other women interviewed for the story, a few of whom had worked for Trump, stated they had not received unwanted advances and "they had never known Mr. Trump to objectify women or treat them with disrespect." Jill Martin, a vice president and assistant counsel at the company, said Trump was supportive of her and her role as a mother. Laura Kirilova Chukanov, a Bulgarian immigrant and 2009 Miss USA pageant contestant, said Trump helped her make connections for a documentary she was working on about her home country.

Rowanne Brewer Lane, Trump's former girlfriend, was quoted at length in the article and was featured in the opening anecdote. Following the article's publication, Brewer Lane accused The New York Times of taking her quotes out of context and said she was "flattered" and not insulted by Trump. Trump spokesperson Barry Bennett responded to the story by stating: "They talked to 50 women and managed to put seven or eight in the story. Over half of them had great things to say. The one that had great things to say, they twisted it and called her debased which is not how she feels." The New York Times defended the story and said Brewer Lane was "quoted fairly, accurately and at length".

== 2005 Access Hollywood tape and second 2016 presidential debate ==
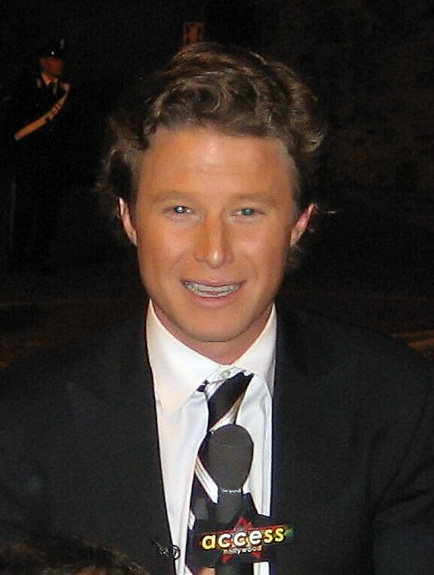
Billy Bush was recorded having what The Washington Post called "an extremely lewd conversation about women" with Trump in 2005.

Two days before the second 2016 presidential debate, the 2005 Access Hollywood tape was released, which recorded what The Washington Post called "an extremely lewd conversation about women" that Trump had with co-host Billy Bush in which he described being able to kiss and grope women because he was "a star":

"You know I'm automatically attracted to beautiful—I just start kissing them. It's like a magnet. Just kiss. I don't even wait. And when you're a star, they let you do it, you can do anything ... grab them by the pussy. You can do anything."

Many attorneys and media commentators have said Trump's statements described sexual assault. (Note: Grabbing someone's vulva without consent is considered sexual assault in most jurisdictions in the United States. Trump and some of his supporters claim that Trump was not saying he committed a sexual assault, or asserted that groping is not sexual assault. Journalist Emily Crockett says this is further evidence of a trend to minimize sexual assaults against women. John Banzhaf, a public interest law professor at George Washington University, stated that "if Trump suddenly and without any warning reached out and grabbed a woman's crotch or breast, it would rather clearly constitute sexual assault," and that Trump's remarks may imply consent, pointing to Trump's statement "and when you're a star, they let you do it. You can do anything.")

On October 7, Trump released a video statement in which he stated, "I said it, I was wrong, and I apologize." He called the development a distraction and attempted to deflect attention to the Clintons, and in particular sexual assault scandals involving Bill Clinton. Republican critics called on him to withdraw from the presidential race.

During the second debate, Anderson Cooper asked Trump if he understood that he had bragged about sexually assaulting women. Cooper used the Justice Department's sexual assault definition to include "any type of sexual contact or behavior that occurs without the explicit consent of the recipient". Trump denied having said that he had sexually assaulted women. He said that the comments were merely "locker room talk", then, after being asked three times whether he had ever kissed or groped any person without consent, he said "no I have not". Several of his subsequent accusers said this was the moment at which they were motivated to come forward.

== Public allegations since 2016 ==
=== Jessica Leeds (1980s) ===
In the early 1980s, Leeds was a businesswoman at a paper company on a flight from the Midwest, returning to New York. A flight attendant offered her an empty seat in the first-class cabin next to Trump. Leeds alleged that about 45 minutes after takeoff, Trump lifted the armrest and began touching her, grabbing her breasts, and tried to put his hand up her skirt. "He was like an octopus," she said. "His hands were everywhere. It was an assault." Leeds said she had sent a letter containing her allegations to the editor of The New York Times. Her story was printed by The New York Times in October 2016, along with the account from Rachel Crooks.

Trump spokesman Jason Miller responded to the allegation calling it "fiction". Miller stated the charges were politically motivated "for this to only become public decades later in the final month of a campaign for president should say it all". Trump publicly threatened to sue the Times over the newspaper's publication of the allegation, and demanded a retraction. The Times rejected Trump's retraction demand, and Trump never followed through on his threat to take legal action against the company. A witness in the case who said he saw "nothing untoward" upon the flight was former British Conservative county councillor from Gloucestershire, Anthony Gilberthorpe. Gilberthorpe has previously made false allegations against politicians.

=== Kristin Anderson (1990s) ===
On October 14, 2016, The Washington Post reported an allegation by Kristin Anderson. Anderson said that Trump groped her beneath her skirt in a Manhattan nightclub in the early 1990s. An aspiring model at the time of the alleged incident, Anderson told the story to her friends, and decided to come forward after reading accounts of other women who had done so. Anderson believed the alleged assault occurred at the China Club, a Manhattan nightclub that Newsday referred to as "Donald's Monday-night nest" due to his alleged habit of picking up women there.

=== Stacey Williams (1993) ===
On October 23, 2024, former Sports Illustrated model Stacey Williams alleged that Trump had groped her in 1993 while Jeffrey Epstein looked on.

Williams told The Guardian that Trump and Epstein had been "really, really good friends and spent a lot of time together." In 2017, Epstein had told journalist Michael Wolff that he had been Donald Trump's "closest friend for 10 years". Williams's accusation made her the 27th person to accuse Trump of sexual misconduct.

=== Beatrice Keul (1993) ===
On October 30, 2024, the Daily Mail reported that Swiss model Beatrice Keul said that Trump had groped her in 1993 in his suite at New York's Plaza Hotel. On October 26, 2026, Democrats on the House Judiciary Committee released a report in which Keul described that assault as rape. The report alleges that Trump invited Keul upstairs to his suite for a meeting to discuss her career and education. Once inside, Trump raped her, tearing her dress and causing bleeding and multiple bruises on her body. After the assault, Trump allegedly repeated a promise to help Keul obtain a visa and an admission to New York University, asking her to promise to remain silent. The report quotes Trump as telling Keul, "The show must go on."

=== Lisa Boyne (1996) ===
On October 13, 2016, The Huffington Post reported an allegation by Lisa Boyne. Boyne said Sonja Morgan (then Sonja Tremont) invited her to a dinner with Trump, modeling agent John Casablancas, and five or six models. Boyne alleged that Trump made the models walk across the table, looked under their skirts, and described if they were wearing underwear. Morgan told The Huffington Post that the dinner took place with those participants, did not recall lewd behaviour by Trump, and said: "But I have been known to dance on tables." Boyne said she called her roommate Karen Beatrice that night to inform her about the incident. The Huffington Post contacted Beatrice, who denied any such call.

=== Cathy Heller (1997) ===
On October 15, 2016, The Guardian reported an allegation by Cathy Heller that she was grabbed and kissed by Donald Trump two decades earlier. Heller said that, in 1997, she met Trump when she attended a Mother's Day brunch with her children, her husband, and her husband's parents at his Mar-a-Lago estate. Her parents-in-law were members of Mar-a-Lago. Heller was introduced to Trump, who became angry when she avoided a kiss. He then "grabbed" her and, when he tried to kiss her, she turned her head. Trump kissed her on the side of the mouth "for a little too long" and then he left her.

Heller's husband and children, who were present during the event, have corroborated her account. In the summer of 2015, the members of Heller's mahjong group heard Heller's account of the 1997 incident; this was not long after Trump announced his candidacy. She decided to go public after seeing the second presidential debate on October 9, 2016. Trump campaign spokesperson Jason Miller said Heller's account is "false" and "politically motivated".

=== Temple Taggart McDowell (1997) ===
In May 2016, The New York Times reported allegations by Temple Taggart McDowell. McDowell, who was Miss Utah USA in 1997, accused Trump of unwanted kisses and embraces that left McDowell and one of her chaperones so uncomfortable, according to McDowell, that she said she was instructed not to be left in a room alone with him again. According to McDowell, a chaperone had accompanied her to Trump's office. At the time, McDowell was 21 and was known as Temple Taggart. This incident occurred in Trump's first year of ownership of the Miss USA contest.

McDowell told her story initially to The New York Times in May 2016 which was published in the "Crossing the Line: How Donald Trump Behaved With Women in Private" article. She had not intended to speak publicly about the incidents again, but she received numerous calls recently due to the "Crossing the Line" article and felt, as a mother, that it is essential to share a message about unwanted advances: "You have the right to say no. You have the right to get out of there. You have the right to leave, and you have the right to make them feel uncomfortable if they're making you feel uncomfortable," she said. Trump said he did not know her and denied McDowell's claims. He also told The New York Times he is "reluctant to kiss strangers on the lips".

Taggart McDowell said she is a Republican and did not come out with the allegation in order to support Hillary Clinton.

=== Amy Dorris (1997) ===
Former model Amy Dorris said in September 2020 that she and her boyfriend, Jason Binn, attended the 1997 U.S. Open with Donald Trump, who Binn had described as his best friend. She alleges that Trump groped and kissed her without her consent at the event:

She accused Trump of forcing his tongue down her throat, touching her all over her body and holding her in a grip from which she could not escape, while ignoring her pleas to stop. 'His hands were very gropey and all over my butt, my breasts, my back, everything,' she said, recalling how she used her teeth to try to force his tongue out of her mouth. 'I felt trapped.' ... 'It felt like there were tentacles on me that I couldn't rip off,' she said. 'I was trying to get his arms off of me and they would not come off because I wasn't strong enough.'

The Guardian confirmed that she told her mother and a friend in New York immediately after the incident and that she had told her therapist and several other friends about it over the years. Trump denied the allegation via his lawyers. Former top model Caron Bernstein stated that her husband was the New York friend and that Dorris had told her about the assault in 2008.

=== Karena Virginia (1998) ===
At an October 2016 press conference with attorney Gloria Allred, yoga instructor and life coach Karena Virginia said that in 1998 Trump grabbed her arm and touched her breast. Virginia, who was 27 years old at the time, was waiting for a ride after the US Open in Queens, New York. She said Trump, whom she had not met previously, approached her with a small group of other men, while commenting on her legs, then he grabbed her right arm. Virginia continued, "Then his hand touched the right side of my breast. I was in shock. I flinched. 'Don't you know who I am? Don't you know who I am?'—that's what he said to me. I felt intimidated and I felt powerless."

Trump campaign spokesperson Jessica Ditto responded to the allegation with a statement reading in part, "Discredited political operative Gloria Allred, in another coordinated, publicity seeking attack with the Clinton campaign, will stop at nothing to smear Mr. Trump."

=== Karen Johnson (early 2000s) ===
In Barry Levine and Monique El-Faizy's book All the President's Women: Donald Trump and the Making of a Predator, Karen Johnson alleged that she attended a New Year's Eve party at Trump's Mar-a-Lago estate, where Trump grabbed her by her genitals, pulled her behind a tapestry, and forcibly kissed her. Johnson also alleged that days after the incident, Trump repeatedly called her (without her giving him the phone number), offering to fly her to meet him, which she rejected. The book states that Johnson told a friend about the incident years before Trump ran for president.

=== Mindy McGillivray (2003) ===
In an October 2016 article by The Palm Beach Post, Mindy McGillivray stated that in January 2003, when she was 23 years old, she was groped by Trump at his Mar-a-Lago estate. She said, "All of a sudden I felt a grab, a little nudge. I think it's [my friend Ken Davidoff's] camera bag, that was my first instinct. I turn around and there's Donald. He sort of looked away quickly." Ken Davidoff, a photographer, corroborated McGillivray's account, saying he remembered her pulling him aside moments after the alleged incident to say "Donald just grabbed my ass!"

McGillivray said she "chose to stay quiet" and never reported the incident to authorities. She had shared details of the incident only with close family and friends until she heard Trump deny such behavior during the second presidential debate on October 9, 2016. Hope Hicks, Trump's press secretary, said McGillivray's allegations lacked "any merit or veracity" and were untruthful.

Ken Davidoff's brother, Darryl Davidoff, said he was also present at the time at Mar-a-Lago and that in his opinion McGillivray is lying. According to Darryl: "I do not believe it really happened. Nobody saw it happen and she just wanted to be in the limelight." (Note: Ken Davidoff has said that Darryl made the statement casting doubt on McGillivray's allegation in order to protect the family photography business.)

=== Rachel Crooks (2005) ===
In 2005, Rachel Crooks was a 22-year-old receptionist at Bayrock Group, a real estate investment and development company in Trump Tower in Manhattan. She says she encountered Trump in an elevator in the building one morning and turned to introduce herself. They shook hands, but Trump would not let go. Instead, he began kissing her cheeks, then directly on the mouth. "It was so inappropriate," Crooks recalled in an interview. "I was so upset that he thought I was so insignificant that he could do that." Her story was printed by The New York Times in October 2016, along with that of Jessica Leeds. Trump has disputed Crooks's claims, writing on Twitter, "Who would do this in a public space with live security cameras running?"

=== Natasha Stoynoff (2005) ===
Canadian author and journalist Natasha Stoynoff, who wrote for People magazine and, previously, the Toronto Star and Toronto Sun, went to Trump's Florida estate in December 2005 to interview him and his wife, Melania. While there, Trump gave Stoynoff a tour of the Mar-a-Lago estate. She says that during this tour, he pushed her against a wall and forced his tongue into her mouth.

Stoynoff described the alleged episode, "We walked into that room alone, and Trump shut the door behind us. I turned around, and within seconds he was pushing me against the wall and forcing his tongue down my throat ... I was stunned. And I was grateful when Trump's longtime butler burst into the room a minute later, as I tried to unpin myself." Stoynoff composed herself and conducted the interview, after which she said Trump repeatedly told her, "We're going to have an affair, I'm telling you." Melania was also interviewed for that article.

Trump sent out a tweet on October 13, 2016, in which he said it had not happened and wondered why she had not mentioned the event in her People article of 2005. Stoynoff responded that she had become angry when Trump denied assaulting women during the presidential debate and was triggered by the release of the Access Hollywood recording in early October. Until that point, she said, she had conflicting emotions common among victims of assault, combined with embarrassment and confusion. J.D. Heyman, People's deputy editor, said: "It was disorienting for her. She felt a great deal of worry and distress about it. Then she felt angry."

That same day, Melania's lawyer demanded an apology from People magazine, stating that Melania did not say some or all of what was quoted in the People article by Stoynoff published on October 12, 2016; Melania specifically denied Stoynoff's claim that she'd run into her on Fifth Avenue following the article's publication. In an interview with Anderson Cooper that aired October 17 on CNN, Melania again denied having crossed paths with Stoynoff on Fifth Avenue, as stated in Stoynoff's article. The following day, People published the account of Liza Herz. Herz said she witnessed the sidewalk encounter between Stoynoff and Melania Trump; Herz' account corroborated that of Stoynoff.

On October 18, People produced six corroborating witnesses who said Stoynoff had recounted the incident to them around the time it occurred. The six witnesses were: "two editors from People, Mary Green and Liz McNeil; a professor of journalism, Paul McLaughlin; a co-worker; and two personal friends of Ms. Stoynoff".

Trump's former butler at Mar-a-Lago resort in Florida, Anthony Senecal, was asked about the 2005 incident in which Stoynoff alleged that the butler had "burst in" on Trump while she was pinned down by him; Senecal denied it ever happened, stating that as a butler "I don't burst in. I knock, then I go in, usually after someone says 'come in'," further alleging "And when I went in, there was nothing strange about where she was standing." According to Senecal, the alleged incident took place in an old massage room with windows all around which made it unsuitable to grope anyone since there was no privacy.

=== Juliet Huddy (2005 or 2006) ===
In early December 2017, the reporter Juliet Huddy said Trump kissed her on the lips while they were on an elevator in Trump Tower with Trump's security guard in 2005 or 2006. Regarding this incident, Huddy said "I was surprised that he went for the lips. But I didn't feel threatened ... Whatever, everything was fine. It was a weird moment. He never tried anything after that, and I was never alone with him."

=== Jessica Drake (2006) ===
On October 22, 2016, Jessica Drake and attorney Gloria Allred held a news conference in which Drake accused Trump of having sexually assaulted her by grabbing tightly in a hug and forcibly kissing her and two acquaintances nearly ten years prior. Drake, an adult film actress and sex education advocate, said she met Trump at her company's booth during a charity golf tournament at Lake Tahoe in 2006. Drake claims she was invited to meet with Trump, who was married at the time, at his hotel suite; she was "uncomfortable going alone" and brought two friends. Describing the meeting with Trump, Drake recounted that "He grabbed each of us tightly, in a hug and kissed each one of us without asking permission." Drake said she and her friends left the suite after 30–45 minutes. Shortly thereafter, Drake claims she received phone calls from Trump or his associate, requesting that she join him in his suite for $10,000, and offering to fly her on his jet back to Los Angeles. She said she declined his offers.

During the news conference, Drake said, "I am not looking for monetary compensation. I do not need additional fame ... I understand that I may be called a liar or an opportunist but I will risk that in order to stand in solidarity with women who share similar accounts." During the news conference, Gloria Allred held up a picture showing Trump and Drake standing together at the time.

In response to Drake's allegations, the Trump campaign stated that her story is "false and ridiculous", that "[t]he picture is one of thousands taken out of respect for people asking to have their picture taken with Mr. Trump" but Trump did not know Drake and "would have no interest in ever knowing her", and that the story was "just another attempt by the Clinton campaign to defame a candidate". Donald Trump appeared to dismiss the significance of the accusation because of Drake's line of work, saying, "Oh, I'm sure she's never been grabbed before."

=== Ninni Laaksonen (2006) ===
On October 27, 2016, a local Finnish tabloid, Ilta-Sanomat, reported an allegation by Ninni Laaksonen, Miss Finland 2006. Laaksonen appeared with Trump on the Late Show with David Letterman on July 26, 2006. Laaksonen claims that before they went on the air, Trump grabbed her buttocks. As Laaksonen describes the interaction: "He really grabbed my butt. I don't think anybody saw it but I flinched and thought: "What is happening?" Someone later told Laaksonen that Trump liked her because she looked like his wife, Melania, when she was younger.

Laaksonen revealed her account to a local Finnish tabloid, Ilta-Sanomat, which had contacted her regarding the level of professionalism involved in Donald Trump's handling of his employees within the Miss Universe pageant. The story was published on October 27, 2016.

=== Cassandra Searles (2013) ===
In October 2016, Rolling Stone and NPR reported Trump fondled Cassandra Searles, Miss Washington USA of 2013, without her consent during the Miss USA pageant of that year. In June 2016, Searles wrote that Trump invited her to his hotel room. Yahoo! News published an article in June 2016 stating that Searles had made Facebook postings that accused Trump of making unwanted advances. She said he was "continually" groping her buttocks and had asked her to go "to his hotel room". Searles also asserted that Trump had "treated us like cattle". Trump and his campaign have not specifically responded to Searles's allegations.

== Allegations of underage sex parties ==
On October 25, 2016, allegations were made by two men stating that Trump had attended and partaken in sex parties filled with underage minor females as young as 15 years old who were induced with promises of career advancement. Illegal drugs were also alleged to have been provided to the minors.

One man was identified as model and actor Andy Lucchesi, while the other was identified as a fashion photographer who spoke on condition of anonymity. Both men claim to have been acquaintances of Trump during that decade, which one described as his "Trump days".

Lucchesi, for his part, said that he saw Trump engage in sexual activity with the girls but did not witness him taking illicit drugs. Regarding the age of the girls, Lucchesi said he himself never specifically asked about their ages, only remarking of the attendees "a lot of girls, [aged] 14, look 24."

== Pageant dressing room visits ==
Trump owned the Miss Universe franchise, which includes Miss USA and Miss Teen USA, from 1996 to 2015. In a Howard Stern interview in 2005, he said he made a practice of walking into the contestants' dressing rooms unannounced while the women were undressed:

I'll go backstage before a show, and everyone's getting dressed and ready and everything else. ...You know, no men are anywhere. And I'm allowed to go in because I'm the owner of the pageant. And therefore I'm inspecting it. ... Is everyone OK? You know, they're standing there with no clothes. And you see these incredible-looking women. And so I sort of get away with things like that. But no, I've been very good.

In that interview, Trump declined to say whether he had had sex with any contestants, saying, "It could be a conflict of interest". Stern then imitated a foreign contestant ("Mr. Trump, in my country, we say hello with vagina"), and Trump jokingly responded, "Well, you could also say, as the owner of the pageant, it's your obligation to do that."

=== Miss Teen USA contestants (1997) ===
Mariah Billado, Miss Vermont Teen USA, is one of five women to mention such a dressing room visit incident in 1997. Billado said of the visit: "I remember putting on my dress really quick, because I was like, 'Oh my god, there's a man in here.' Trump, she recalled, said something like, 'Don't worry, ladies, I've seen it all before.'" Billado recalled talking to Ivanka, Trump's daughter, who responded "Yeah, he does that." Victoria Hughes, Miss New Mexico Teen USA, also said Trump did conduct a dressing room visit, and that the youngest contestant there was 15. The dressing room had 51 contestants, each with their own stations. Eleven girls said they did not see Trump enter the dressing room, though some said it was possible that he had entered while they were somewhere else, or that they did not notice.

Trump's campaign stated the allegations of his entering the dressing room "have no merit and have already been disproven by many other individuals who were present".

=== Bridget Sullivan (2000) ===
In 2000, Bridget Sullivan was Miss New Hampshire USA. As she prepared for a television broadcast, Trump allegedly walked into the dressing room. She told BuzzFeed he was coming to wish the contestants good luck, but they "were all naked". Some contestants that night do not remember his entering while the ladies prepared and other contestants mentioned that they had no negative experiences with Trump. A spokesman for Trump said Sullivan's claims were "totally false".

=== Tasha Dixon (2001) ===
Tasha Dixon, Miss Arizona USA 2001, told a CBS affiliate in Los Angeles that in 2001, "[Trump] just came strolling right in. There was no second to put a robe on or any sort of clothing or anything. Some girls were topless, other girls were naked." She said that having been walked in on when the women had little or no clothes put them in a "very physically vulnerable position, and then to have the pressure of the people that work for him telling us to go fawn all over him, go walk up to him, talk to him ..." Another contestant, Miss California USA 2009 Carrie Prejean Boller, told the same CBS affiliate it was wrong to paint Trump that way. Trump's response, provided through spokeswoman Jessica Ditto, is that: "These accusations have no merit and have already been disproven by many other individuals who were present," and Ditto adds that she believes there is a political motivation behind the accusation.

=== Unnamed contestants (2001) ===
An unnamed Miss USA contestant said that in 2001 Trump walked into her dressing room unannounced while she and another contestant were undressed. She told The Guardian Trump "just barged right in, didn't say anything, stood there and stared at us. ... He didn't walk in and say, 'Oh, I'm so sorry, I was looking for someone.' He walked in, he stood and he stared. He was doing it because he knew that he could." Another contestant told The Guardian the contestant had spoken to others of this event at the time.

=== Samantha Holvey (2006) ===
On October 14, 2016, Samantha Carol Holvey, Miss North Carolina USA 2006, related that "Trump's conduct was 'creepy' around the women participating but he never made an advance toward her." She also said that before pageant events, Trump had "moved into areas where she and other contestants were getting ready", and that she had "never been around men that were like that".

More than a year after Trump was elected president, and after many high-profile men, such as Harvey Weinstein, had lost their jobs because of sexual harassment allegations, Holvey wrote: "You can't work in Hollywood if you're a sexual predator, but you can become the commander-in-chief?" She then related how Trump made her feel very uncomfortable at the 2006 Miss USA pageant: "He eyed me like a piece of meat. I was shocked and disgusted. I have never felt so objectified. I left the meet-and-greet hoping that this would be my one and only encounter with him." She also described how he had come backstage unannounced, with Melania Trump: "I was shocked—again—by this violation of our personal space. What was he doing, coming backstage when we were still getting dressed?"

== Relationship with Jeffrey Epstein ==
For around 15 years, Trump maintained a friendship with convicted sex trafficker Jeffrey Epstein, and those who knew them at the time said they would frequently hit on and compete for young women. Trump and Epstein met sometime around 1990 when Epstein bought a mansion two miles (3 km) north of Mar-a-Lago which Trump had purchased five years earlier in 1985. In 1992, NBC News cameras saw the two partying with a group of Buffalo Bills cheerleaders. Trump invited NBC News to film a party he threw for himself and Epstein at Mar-a-Lago, where they joined various NFL cheerleaders. NBC News revealed footage of the party in July 2019, showing Trump, Epstein and the cheerleaders. At one point during the video, Trump grabbed a woman around her waist, pulled her against his body, and patted her buttocks. At another point, Trump appears to tell Epstein: "Look at her, back there ... She's hot." Also during the footage, Trump was seen dancing with a crowd of young women and whispering in Epstein's ear.

Months later, Trump and Epstein held a "calendar girl competition" where Trump and Epstein were the only guests according to George Houraney who arranged the event. In 1997, Jill Harth dropped a sexual misconduct lawsuit against Trump from the "calendar girl competition" where she alleged Trump took her into a bedroom and forcibly kissed and fondled her, and restrained her from leaving. Trump and Epstein were also spotted at a 1997 Victoria's Secret "Angels" party in Manhattan.

Epstein attended Trump's 1993 wedding to Marla Maples.

Court records showed that Trump flew on Epstein's private jet at least seven times over four years in the 1990s.

A 2002 article in New York magazine quoted Trump talking about Epstein: "I've known Jeff for fifteen years. Terrific guy. He's a lot of fun to be with. It is even said that he likes beautiful women as much as I do, and many of them are on the younger side. No doubt about it, Jeffrey enjoys his social life." In a 2017 recording, Epstein stated that he was "Donald's closest friend for ten years."

The two had a falling out in 2004. They reportedly became rivals when they both wanted to purchase the same oceanfront mansion in Florida. In another account, they parted ways when Epstein made advances towards the daughter of a Mar-a-Lago member. Luke Broadwater reports for The New York Times that no evidence exists that Trump and Epstein communicated after 2004.

=== Post-friendship lawsuits ===
A federal lawsuit filed in California in April 2016 against Trump and Jeffrey Epstein by a California woman alleged that the two men sexually assaulted her at a series of parties at Epstein's Manhattan residence in 1994 when she was 13 years old. The suit was dismissed by a federal judge in May 2016 because it did not raise valid claims under federal law. The woman filed another federal suit in New York in June 2016, but it was withdrawn three months later, apparently without being served on the defendants. A third federal suit was filed in New York in September 2016.

The two latter suits included affidavits by an anonymous witness who attested to the accusations in the suits, asserting Epstein employed her to procure underage girls for him, and an anonymous person who declared the plaintiff had told him/her about the assaults at the time they occurred. The plaintiff, who had filed anonymously as Jane Doe, was scheduled to appear in a Los Angeles press conference six days before the 2016 election, but abruptly canceled the event; her lawyer Lisa Bloom asserted that the woman had received threats. The suit was dropped on November 4, 2016. Trump attorney Alan Garten denied the allegations, while Epstein declined to comment.

=== Epstein Files ===
==== June and July, 2025 ====
According to a post published by Elon Musk on June 6, 2025, as part of the Trump–Musk feud, Trump appeared in the files related to Jeffrey Epstein. He stated it was the real reason why the files have not been made public. Trump's relationship with Epstein received significant media attention in 2025 due to the unwillingness of the Trump administration to release files relating to Epstein, despite Trump's earlier promises to do so during the 2024 campaign. Trump received significant amounts of blowback from the media, the public, and even many of his supporters for this decision. While Trump has attempted to distance himself from Epstein and downplay their association, some of the MAGA movement's most fervent supporters have grown increasingly vocal in demanding the release of Epstein-related files, leading to visible fractures within his support base.

After U.S. Attorney General Pam Bondi and other Trump officials had for months teased the imminent release of incendiary information (the "Jeffrey Epstein client list") from FBI records of the investigation into Epstein's sex trafficking operation, Bondi stated in a memo released in July 2025 that there was no evidence that Epstein had such a list or that he had blackmailed prominent individuals. The memo also confirmed that Epstein had committed suicide while in custody. The announcement caused an uproar among some of Trump's most fervent supporters who had bought into the conspiracy theory that Epstein was at the center of "a cabal of powerful men and celebrities, largely Democrats" and that the government had covered it up. In social media posts, Trump said the continuing demands for release of the files were a hoax perpetrated by Democrats, and that his supporters pressing for release were "stupid", "foolish", and "past supporters".

On July 17, 2025, The Wall Street Journal published a story about Trump sending a "bawdy" letter to Epstein in 2003 celebrating his 50th birthday. The letter was collected by Epstein's accomplice, Ghislaine Maxwell, for a leather-bound photo album sometime before 2006, and was among the documents examined by the Justice Department who investigated Epstein and Maxwell years ago. The letter, which bore Trump's signature, featured several lines of typewritten text framed by the outline of a naked woman, apparently hand-drawn with a heavy marker. The Wall Street Journal described Trump's "squiggly" signature below the woman's waist as mimicking pubic hair. The letter concluded: "Happy Birthday — and may every day be another wonderful secret". On July 18, Trump filed a libel lawsuit against The Wall Street Journal in the Southern District of Florida for two counts of defamation for $10 billion each, for a total of $20 billion, calling the story "false, defamatory, unsubstantiated, and disparaging". On April 13, 2026, US District judge Darrin Gayles dismissed the case without prejudice on the grounds that Trump had "not plausibly alleged that the Defendants published the Article with actual malice".

On July 29, 2025, when answering a follow-up question from a reporter regarding the nature of the pair's falling out, Trump noted that Epstein had hired away spa attendants from Mar-a-Lago's spa. When asked if one of the spa attendants was Virginia Giuffre, Trump stated: "I think so. I think that was one of the people. He stole her."

==== Released documents ====
The Department of Justice began releasing documents related to Epstein on December 19, with the ones that were released being heavily redacted. Less than one day later, file #468, which showed a photograph of Trump and Epstein together, was removed from the website. The file was later restored. A file released on December 23, 2025, was an email from a Manhattan assistant U.S. attorney, who stated Epstein's flight records revealed that "Donald Trump traveled on Epstein's private jet many more times than previously has been reported (or that we were aware), including during the period we would expect to charge in a Maxwell case."

===== Epstein's alleged letter to Larry Nassar =====
On December 23, the Department of Justice released a letter allegedly written by Epstein to American sex offender Larry Nassar a few days before Epstein's death in August 2019. The existence of the letter allegedly sent to Nassar by Epstein had been first reported by the Associated Press in 2023. Epstein allegedly told Nassar in the letter that "[w]e shared one thing ... our love and caring for young ladies and the hope they'd reach their full potential", and that "Our President also shares our love of young, nubile girls. When a young beauty walked by he loved to "grab snatch", whereas we ended up snatching grub in the mess halls of the system". Trump was president of the United States at the time.

A statement published by the Department of Justice on the same day stated, without directly referencing Epstein's letter to Nassar, that some documents recently released contained false and sensational claims about Trump, and that if such accusations "had a shred of credibility, they certainly would have been weaponized against President Trump already". The DOJ said the letter was fake, stating that there were "several irregularities with the note and the envelope that held it." The DOJ noted that "The writing does not appear to match Jeffrey Epstein's" and that "The return address did not list the jail where Epstein was held and did not include his inmate number, which is required for outgoing mail". They further noted that the envelope had a postmark from northern Virginia while Epstein was detained in New York. The letter was also postmarked three days after Epstein died.

===== Allegations sent to the NTOC =====
On January 30, 2026, the DOJ released an email titled "NTOC Names" from August 6, 2025, which contained a report from the FBI's National Threat Operations Center (NTOC) describing sexual allegations made against Trump, including some involving Epstein. The email was sent from a Tactical Specialist-Staff Operations Specialist, as part of the Child Exploitation & Human Trafficking Task Force in the FBI New York Field Office. The allegations originated from unverified tips made to the NTOC by phone or electronically. Some of those who submitted the information left no contact information or were reporting second hand information. The New York Times said they weren't able to corroborate any of the allegations. Other files also revealed that the FBI had in fact secretly investigated Epstein-related allegations against Trump, with some being described as "not credible."

====== 1984 Lake Michigan allegation ======
One of the files released around December 24, 2025, contains a woman's tip to the NTOC on August 3, 2020, during the 2020 United States presidential election campaign. The woman claimed that she was trafficked to Epstein in 1984, at the age of 13, and gave birth that year. She alleges that her uncle killed her child and threw the body into Lake Michigan, while Trump watched. She further claims that Trump "[paid me] to force me to [redacted] with him". It is unknown if the FBI ever investigated her claims. A Snopes article said the date of the allegations "did not line up with the established timeline of Trump's friendship with Epstein", and that neither had ties to Lake Michigan at the time. They were not able to substantiate any of the claims in the tip.

====== 1990 (circa) oral rape allegation ======
The NTOC received a complaint that alleges that Trump forced a 13–14 year old female to perform oral sex on him. According to the complaint, the girl bit Trump while performing the sex act. The alleged victim also claims to have been abused by Epstein. The complainant is a female friend of the alleged victim who claims this took place approximately 35 years ago in New Jersey. This lead was described in an internal FBI PowerPoint deck detailing "prominent names" in the Epstein and Maxwell investigations.

Unlike many NTOC allegations investigators considered unverifiable or not credible, this lead was sent to the FBI's Washington office and the accuser was interviewed by the FBI four times. As of March 2026, only one of these interview transcripts has been released to the public, and that interview does not address the Trump incident. On March 6, 2026, DOJ released 16 pages of summaries of the interviews with the alleged victim, claiming they were previously withheld because they were "incorrectly coded as duplicative".

The FBI summaries state the alleged victim recalls being introduced to Trump who immediately disliked her because she was a "boy-girl" – meaning a tomboy. She claims when left alone in a room with him, Trump said "Let me teach you how little girls are supposed to be", unzipped his pants and forced her head down to his penis. The report says she then immediately "bit the shit out of it", and that in response he "pulled her hair and punched her on the side of the head". Trump said something to the effect of "get this little bitch the hell out of here" and kicked her out. She told the FBI she bit him because he "disgusted" her.

Aspects of her story have been corroborated through public records, though none that relate directly to the claims about Trump.

According to a log of Maxwell discovery material and serial numbers stamped on the released files, as of March 2026, 37 pages of records related to these interviews remain missing from the public release of Epstein files.

====== 1995 limousine allegation ======
A document dated to October 2020 made reference to a report by a limousine driver about a "very concerning" phone call Trump had while being driven by him in 1995. The man, whose name was redacted, said that Trump had referenced "Epstein" and "abusing some girl" during the call. The unidentified man also quoted a woman saying, about Trump, that "he raped me". The man further said that "Donald J. Trump had raped her along with Jeffrey Epstein". According to a released document, the alleged rape victim told the driver in late 1999 that she had made a police report. He was then informed in the following year that the woman had been "found with her head 'blown off' in Kiefer, OK" and that her death was deemed by police as definitely not a suicide, while "Corner stated it was a suicide". The DOJ described the claims as "untrue and sensationalist" on December 23, 2025. On January 30, 2026, the DOJ's released "NTOC Names" email from August 2025 provided additional details to this allegation, revealing the limousine driver was taking Trump to Dallas-Forth Worth International Airport in 1995. During the ride, the limousine driver talked about being "a few seconds from pulling the limousine over on the median and within a few seconds of pulling him [Trump] out of the car and hurting him due to some of the things he was saying". This summary reports that the limousine driver's "ex-girlfriend': [redacted] were victims of Epstein's and one was murdered".

====== 1995–1996 Trump Golf Course allegation ======
Another allegation in the report accused Trump of being a client for sex-trafficking at the Trump Golf Course in Rancho Palos Verdes, California from 1995 to 1996. She claims that Ghislaine Maxwell acted as a broker for sex parties for Epstein, Trump, and Robin Leach. She claims to have been threatened to stay silent on this by Trump's then head of security. The complainant claims to have been a participant in some of the orgies and that she heard rumors of girls going missing by being murdered and buried at the facility. However, the report also indicates that this complainant was spoken to and was deemed as not credible.

====== Victoria's Secret Models allegation ======
One alleged victim in the DOJ's "NTOC Names" email report claims that at 16 years old while working as a model, herself, other young girls and older models for Victoria's Secret, were involved in "big orgy parties" with Trump and Bill Clinton at Epstein's residence in New York. The alleged victim also claims that Epstein sexually assaulted her.

====== Mar-a-Lago allegation ======
A complaint from 2020 alleges that Trump raped her at 13 years old at a party in Mar-a-Lago. The complainant accuses Trump of attending multiple of these parties where he would stick his finger into the vaginas and vulvas of children to rate them on their tightness in order to auction them off. The alleged victim claims that many of them were taken into rooms and forced to be sexually penetrated by Trump, alongside giving him oral sex. The complainant alleges that elders such as Elon Musk, Donald Trump Jr., Ivanka Trump, Eric Trump, Alan Dershowitz, and Robert Shapiro were in attendance. One of the files released showed an email was sent by an unknown person on September 28, 2012, asking what Epstein would "think of going to Mar-a-Lago after xmas instead of his island?". Both the sender and recipient of the email were redacted in the release. Trump has said that he ended ties with Epstein in 2004.

== Other incidents ==
In a 1998 interview with Chris Matthews, two years before his 2000 presidential campaign, Trump said that his history with women could prove to be an issue in the event of a future presidential campaign, saying "Can you imagine how controversial I'd be?...You think about (Bill Clinton) with the women. How about me with the women? Can you imagine?"

CNN posted a video in 2016 describing various sexually suggestive comments that Trump has made publicly about his daughter Ivanka.

Trump's top strategist, Steve Bannon, said that Trump lawyer "Marc Kasowitz 'took care' of 100 women during the [2016] presidential campaign".

=== 1987 Trump Plaza allegation ===
One caller in the "NTOC Names" email report by the DOJ claims her friend saw Trump at Trump plaza after drinking and was given a drink by a stranger to meet him. Her friend allegedly told her this took place in 1987. The caller alleges that her friend saw a flash of Trump's face after waking up feeling sore in a bed with $300 and without any clothes on, not remembering how she got there. This caller says she was called by this friend who accused Trump of raping her while she was drunk. The alleged victim had not gone to a hospital to perform a rape kit, citing concerns that no one would believe her since she was drunk. She also believed Trump to be responsible for sabotaging the relationship that her husband's business had with its suppliers. The caller claims the alleged victim was never seen again after meeting an unknown man in a bar, one who appeared to be familiar with the alleged victim but who nobody in the bar could recognize. The victim was declared deceased as remains of her that matched what she wore before going missing were found a few years before 2025. However, DNA tests could not confirm this.

== Reactions ==
=== Comparisons to other behavior ===
Shaun R. Harper, executive director of the Penn Graduate Center for Education, has said that "many men talk like Donald Trump", objectifying women and saying offensive things about them. He puts Trump in a class of men whose behavior sometimes includes sexual assault and degrading women. The Economist drew similar parallels, pointing to research that objectifying women can make sexual assault more likely. NPR reported that Trump has exhibited questionable behavior in his treatment of women for some time, using offensive language to describe women including Megyn Kelly, Rosie O'Donnell, and former Miss Universe Alicia Machado. Arwa Mahdawi of The Guardian called his past remarks a "masterclass in rape culture", pointing to statements such as "26,000 unreported sexual assaults in the military—only 238 convictions. What did these geniuses expect when they put men and women together?" and "women, you have to treat 'em like shit." On October 13, 2016, a transcript from a 1994 Primetime Live interview was unearthed where Trump states "I tell friends who treat their wives magnificently, get treated like crap in return, 'Be rougher and you'll see a different relationship.'" In November 2025, Trump received media criticism after saying "Quiet, piggy" to a female reporter, which The Boston Globe described as the second time Trump issued a personal attack at a female reporter within a week.

=== Trump's self-assessment ===
A Voice of America video showing Trump stating, "I have no idea who these women are."

Trump has presented himself as a political martyr in the face of these accusations. (Note: I take all of these slings and arrows, gladly, for you. I take them for our movement, so that we can have our country back. Our great civilization here in America and across the civilized world has come upon a moment of reckoning ... This is our moment of reckoning as a society and as a civilization itself. I didn't need to do this, folks, believe me—believe me. I built a great company and I had a wonderful life. I could have enjoyed the fruits and benefits of years of successful business deals and businesses for myself and my family. Instead of going through this absolute horror show of lies, deceptions, malicious attacks—who would have thought? I'm doing it because this country has given me so much, and I feel so strongly that it's my turn to give back to the country that I love. Many of my friends and many political experts warned me that this campaign would be a journey to hell—said that. But they're wrong. It will be a journey to heaven, because we will help so many people that are so desperately in need of help." — Donald Trump) He declared "this is a conspiracy against you, the American people", saying "the Washington establishment and the financial and media corporations that fund it exist for only one reason: to protect and enrich itself" and that "the Clinton machine is at the center of this power structure." In his next speech, he said The New York Times reporters are "corporate lobbyists" for minority shareholder Carlos Slim and Hillary Clinton, suggesting Slim's motivation is that he "comes from Mexico". Trump also suggested that the accusers may instead have been motivated by fame or money. He then went on to wonder why President Barack Obama had not been accused yet, and denied the Jessica Leeds allegation by saying "she would not be my first choice".

In the third 2016 presidential debate, Trump repeated his claims: "I think they want either fame or her campaign did it and I think it's her campaign." At a speech at Gettysburg outlining his vision for his first 100 days, he repeated his denials and stated "all of these liars will be sued after the election is over". By 2017, however, Trump had not filed suit against any of his accusers.

=== Trump family ===
Melania Trump has responded to the allegations by charging Trump's accusers with lying. Melania has insisted her husband is a "gentleman" and said that he had become a victim of a conspiracy involving the news media and the Clinton campaign. Melania also advocates that it is important to check the background of these women before confiding in them, as the accusations can be a strategy of the opposition party to defame the President.

Ivanka Trump has said she was shocked over Trump's 2005 lewd Access Hollywood tapes. Donald Trump Jr. described the 2005 comments as "a fact of life", and Eric Trump dismissed all allegations of assault as "dirty tricks" from the Clinton campaign.

=== Trump campaign ===
Leeds's and Crooks's allegations, published by The New York Times on October 13, were disputed by Trump's campaign as having "no merit or veracity". The campaign alleged that the Times had a vendetta against Trump. The Los Angeles Times stated that they verified the stories with friends and family members of the accusers to ensure that the stories had been relayed to them earlier. The Trump campaign issued this statement through its spokesman Jason Miller:

This entire article is fiction, and for The New York Times to launch a completely false, coordinated character assassination against Mr. Trump on a topic like this is dangerous. To reach back decades in an attempt to smear Mr. Trump trivializes sexual assault, and it sets a new low for where the media is willing to go in its efforts to determine this election. It is absurd to think that one of the most recognizable business leaders on the planet with a strong record of empowering women in his companies would do the things alleged in this story, and for this to become public only decades later in the final month of a campaign for president should say it all. Further, the Times story buries the pro-Clinton financial and social media activity on behalf of Hillary Clinton's candidacy, reinforcing that this truly is nothing more than a political attack. This is a sad day for the Times.

Trump's campaign staff also stated that the Stoynoff and McGillivray accusations were without merit.

=== Trump's attorneys ===
Trump's attorneys demanded a retraction of the Times article and an apology for what they said was a "libelous article"—defamation designed to destroy Trump's run for president. David McCraw, assistant general counsel for the Times, responded on October 13, 2016, to the libel claims from Trump's attorney. He said Trump's reputation is damaged and "could not be further affected" due to his own statements, like those he made on the Howard Stern show. McCraw continues, "it would have been a disservice not just to our readers but to democracy itself to silence [the accusers'] voices." In response to the request to retract the story, McCraw said, "We decline to do so" and that Trump was free to pursue the matter in court.

Trump's attorney, Michael D. Cohen, has defended Trump by saying the accusers are not women Trump would find to be attractive. (Note: According to Cohen: Beauty is in the eye of beholder ... these aren't even women he'd be attracted to. I think what Mr. Trump is really trying to say is that they're not somebody that he would be attracted to, and therefore, the whole thing is nonsense.)

=== Trump administration ===
In October 2017, White House press secretary Sarah Huckabee Sanders was asked if "the official White House position [is] that all of these women are lying", in reference to the sexual harassment claims against Trump by at least 16 women. Sanders replied, "Yeah, we've been clear on that from the beginning, and the president's spoken on it". In November 2017, Trump criticized Senator Al Franken in the wake of sexual misconduct allegations against Franken. This resulted in Sanders describing "a very clear distinction" between the allegations against Trump and Franken: "Franken has admitted wrongdoing and the president hasn't".

In December 2017, after several of Trump's accusers called on Trump to resign, Sanders said, "the president has addressed these accusations directly and denied all of these allegations, [which] took place long before he was elected." Since Americans elected Trump to office "at a decisive election", Sanders said, "we feel like these allegations have been answered through that process".

=== #WhyWomenDontReport ===
The hashtag #WhyWomenDontReport started trending on Twitter in response to the Trump campaign's statements that the accusers lack credibility. Many commentators disputed the claim that the timing of the allegations during the presidential campaign has a bearing on how likely the events were. The range of reasons given for why women are reluctant to immediately report sexual assault included fear of reprisals, fear that no one will believe them, the low likelihood of obtaining justice against the assailant, and the traumatic experience of having to be reminded of the event. Liz Plank said that Trump's accusers were experiencing all these factors since coming forward. Conversely, civil rights lawyer Debra Katz, and others, said that high-profile cases tend to encourage victims to speak up, even years later.

Tom Tremblay, a police specialist in sexual assault, said: "Victims may wait days, weeks, months, years, decades. [...] When one victim comes forward, it's not at all uncommon to see other victims come forward, who are thinking, 'Well, they came forward; now it's not just my word.'"

Susan Dominus, writing for The New York Times Magazine, hoped this backlash against Trump would lead more people to believe women's stories in the future.

=== Smear allegations ===
The Washington Times online opinion editor and Fox News contributor Monica Crowley said in October 2016 that the accusations come across as a "classic political hit job" on Trump. Fox and Friends co-host Ainsley Earhardt said the allegations were "definitely coordinated" and questioned why the media had given more coverage to the allegations than the Podesta emails.

MSNBC host Joe Scarborough said he was not skeptical of the stories, but "I think it's good to be skeptical when you have stories that are 30 years old that come out days before an election." Fox News Media analyst Howard Kurtz wrote in a column that it was "possible to find the allegations troubling while also questioning their timing and whether it's no accident that the women are breaking their silence a month before the election."

=== Michelle Obama's speech ===
External videos
- First Lady Michelle Obama live in Manchester, New Hampshire | Hillary Clinton (28:27) on YouTube—speech about Trump, sexual predation, and women's experiences

The day after The New York Times reported the allegations, First Lady Michelle Obama delivered a widely praised speech on women's experiences of sexism and sexually predatory behavior. Chris Cillizza of The Washington Post said the speech "will go down as one of the most important of this political cycle, a moment in which she crystallized the feelings of many women in the wake of the Trump tape".

Michelle Obama had planned to deliver her normal campaign speech, but said during her speech it would have been "dishonest and disingenuous" to do so, as she felt compelled to address Trump's remarks on women. The speech was "a message she'd been seeking to deliver for a long time about Donald Trump's cruel language toward women". In her speech Obama denounced the Trump tape and Trump's alleged advances: "This was a powerful individual speaking freely and openly about sexually predatory behavior, and actually bragging about kissing and groping women ... And to make matters worse, it now seems very clear that this isn't an isolated incident." Her speech discussed the history of similar behavior, and the obstacles it places in women's lives, her voice occasionally trembling with emotion:

It's that feeling of terror and violation that too many women have felt when someone has grabbed them, or forced himself on them and they've said no but he didn't listen—something that we know happens on college campuses and countless other places every single day. It reminds us of stories we heard from our mothers and grandmothers about how, back in their day, the boss could say and do whatever he pleased to the women in the office, and even though they worked so hard, jumped over every hurdle to prove themselves, it was never enough.

=== Public response ===
A survey conducted by YouGov in October 2016 found that 43 percent of respondents found the allegations to be credible. Republicans were least likely to find the allegations credible, with only 19 percent of Republicans thinking sexual assault would disqualify Trump from the presidency. A year after the election, and after the Harvey Weinstein sexual abuse allegations and subsequent Me Too movement, 86 percent of Clinton voters found the allegations credible, while only six percent of Trump voters did.

=== Other reactions ===
In 2020, the Michigan Journal of Gender & Law called for a government inquiry into Trump's sexual misconduct, arguing that existing civil litigation and media accounts had not adequately addressed Trump's sexual misconduct.

In a 2021 article for Vox, Andrew Prokop contended that Trump calculated that his populist appeal and cult of personality would make Republican Party elites afraid to cross him, allowing him to weather the allegations. Prokop also suggested that the Republican Party was less inclined to show that they take sexual misconduct allegations seriously.

== See also ==
- 2017–18 United States political sexual scandals
- Karen McDougal § Affair with Donald Trump
- Stormy Daniels–Donald Trump scandal
- In Honor of a Lifetime of Sexual Assault
