= Walter R. Allen =

American sociologist and academic

- Education: University of Chicago; University of North Carolina, Chapel Hill; Beloit College
- Scientific career
- Workplaces: University of California, Los Angeles; University of Michigan
- Thesis: Race, sex, grade level, and disadvantageness in feelings of alienation among adolescents in a southern school (1974)

Walter R. Allen is an American sociologist who is a Distinguished Professor and the Allan Murray Carter Chair in Higher Education at University of California, Los Angeles. His research considers social inequality, diversity in higher education and family patterns. He leads the longitudinal study CHOICES that studies the college attendance of African Americans and Latinos. He is a member of the National Academy of Education.

== Early life and education ==
Allen grew up in Kansas City, Missouri during racial segregation. He was in a military family without a father, and his mother worked in a hospital to support eight children. He has said that his teachers at Manual High School inspired him to attend university. He was an undergraduate student at Beloit College, and he moved to the University of Chicago for doctoral research. In Chicago, Allen was mentored by Edgar G. Epps. His doctoral research investigated how race, sex and socioeconomic status impact adolescents in Southern schools. After earning his doctorate, he spent a year at Howard University as a visiting professor. In 1978, he joined the faculty at the University of North Carolina at Chapel Hill, where he was one of the first Black faculty members.

== Research and career ==
In 1979, Allen joined the faculty at the University of Michigan. He was made professor in 1988, before moving to the University of California, Los Angeles. At UCLA, he was promoted to Distinguished Professor in 2008. His research considers comparative race, ethnicity and inequality. He established the CHOICES project, a long-term investigation into how social inequality impacts life choices and chances. CHOICES eventually became the Center for Capacity Building, which supports under-resourced universities. Allen directs the Summer Training for Excellence in Educational Research program with Spelman College, Howard University and Morehouse College. The program provides students at historically black colleges and universities an opportunity to perform summer research projects at UCLA.

== Awards and honors ==
- 2002 American Sociological Association DuBois- Johnson-Frazier Award
- 2002 Association for the Study of Higher Education Special Merit Award
- 2008 American Educational Research Association Presidential Citation
- 2016 American Educational Research Association Distinguished Career Contribution Award
- 2018 Elected to the National Academy of Education
- 2020 Dr. John Hope Franklin Award
- 2022 Elected Fellow of the American Academy of Arts and Sciences

== Personal life ==
Allen is married to Cathy R. Daniels, with whom he has four children and seven grandchildren.

== Selected publications ==
- Allen, Walter (1992). "The Color of Success: African-American College Student Outcomes at Predominantly White and Historically Black Public Colleges and Universities". Harvard Educational Review. 62 (1): 26–45. doi:10.17763/haer.62.1.wv5627665007v701. Wikidata Q59700190.
- Uma M. Jayakumar; Howard, Tyrone; Allen, Walter; June C. Han (2009). "Racial Privilege in the Professoriate: An Exploration of Campus Climate, Retention, and Satisfaction". The Journal of Higher Education. 80 (5): 538–563. doi:10.1080/00221546.2009.11779031. Wikidata Q101424539.
- Michael C. Thornto; Linda M. Chatters; Taylor, Robert; Allen, Walter (1990). "Sociodemographic and environmental correlates of racial socialization by black parents". Child Development. 61 (2): 401–409. doi:10.2307/1131101. JSTOR 1131101. PMID 2344778. Wikidata Q41194343.
