= Richard Milner =

Richard Milner may refer to:

- Richard Milner (historian), historian of science and singer
- Richard Milner, 3rd Baron Milner of Leeds (born 1959), British peer
- H. Richard Milner, IV (born 1974), American educator
