= The Journal of Higher Education =

American peer-reviewed academic journal

- Discipline: Higher education
- Language: English
- Edited by: Stephen J. Quaye

Publication details
- History: 1930–present
- Publisher: Routledge
- Frequency: Bimonthly
- Impact factor: 2.4 (2024)

Standard abbreviations
- ISO 4: J. High. Educ.

Indexing
- CODEN: JHIEAW
- ISSN: 0022-1546
- LCCN: e32000099
- OCLC no.: 807728950

Links
- Journal homepage; Online access at Project MUSE

The Journal of Higher Education is a bimonthly peer-reviewed academic journal covering higher education. It was established in 1930 and is published by Routledge. Previously, it was published by Ohio State University Press. The editor-in-chief is Stephen J. Quaye (Ohio State University).

== Abstracting and indexing ==
The journal is abstracted and indexed in:

- Arts and Humanities Citation Index
- Current Contents/Social & Behavioral Sciences
- ERIC
- Political Science Abstracts
- Psychological Abstracts
- Social Work Research and Abstracts
- Social Sciences Citation Index

According to the Journal Citation Reports, the journal has a 2024 impact factor of 2.4.
