= Na'ilah Suad Nasir =

American Educational Researcher and Administrator

Na'ilah Suad Nasir is an educational researcher and the sixth president of the Spencer Foundation. She was president of the American Educational Research Association in 2021–22. Previously she held several named professorships, including the Birgeneau Chair in Educational Disparities and the H. Michael and Jeanne Williams Chair of African-American Studies at UC Berkeley, where she also served as the vice-chancellor of equity and inclusion. She has also taught as a faculty member at the Stanford Graduate School of Education.

== Education and career ==
Nasir earned her bachelor's degree from the University of California, Berkeley and PhD in Educational Psychology from the University of California, Los Angeles. Her academic career has focused on socio-cultural perspectives on education and advancing equitable school systems. Nasir's work has resulted in the publication of over 30 scholarly articles and several books including Racialized Identities: Race and Achievement Among African-American Youth; Mathematics for Equity: A Framework for Successful Practice; and We Dare Say Love: Supporting Achievement in the Educational Life of Black Boys. She co-edited the Handbook of the Cultural Foundations of Learning.

== Honors and awards ==
In 2017, she was elected a member of the National Academy of Education. In 2022, she gave the convocation speech to the Northwestern School of Education and Social Policy.

Cultural offices
Preceded by Shaun Harper	President of the American Educational Research Association; 2021–2022	Succeeded by H. Richard Milner, IV
