= H. Richard Milner IV =

American academic (born 1974)

H. Richard Milner IV (born 1974) is an American teacher educator and scholar of urban teacher education on the tenured faculty at the Peabody College of Vanderbilt University, where he is Professor of Education and Cornelius Vanderbilt Endowed Chair of Education at the Department of Teaching and Learning. Formerly, he was the Director of the Center for Urban Education, Helen Faison Endowed Chair of Urban Education, Professor of Education, Professor of Social Work (by courtesy), Professor of Sociology (by courtesy) and Professor of Africana Studies (by courtesy) at the University of Pittsburgh. Since 2012, Milner has served as the editor of the journal Urban Education. In 2012, The Ohio State University Education and Human Ecology Alumni Society Board of Governors recognized him with the Alumni Award of Distinction, "presented to alumni who have achieved success in their field of endeavor and have made a difference in the lives of others through outstanding professional, personal or community contributions". Milner is a policy fellow of the National Education Policy Center, and was appointed by Governor-elect Tom Wolf to the Education Transition Review Team in 2015.

== Education ==
Milner earned his Bachelor of Arts in English (1996) and Master of Arts in Teaching (1997) from South Carolina State University. He completed a Master of Arts (2000) and Ph.D. (2001) in Educational Policy and Leadership at Ohio State University.

== Academic positions ==
From 2008 to 2013, Milner served as the Lois Autrey Betts Associate Professor of Education and founding director of the Learning, Diversity and Urban Studies graduate program in the Departments of Teaching and Learning and Leadership, Policy and Organizations at Peabody College of Education and Human Development at Vanderbilt University. In 2008, Milner was the first African American to earn promotion and tenure at the Peabody College at Vanderbilt. In 2013, Milner joined the faculty at the University of Pittsburgh. In 2018, Milner returned to the Peabody College of Education and Human Development at Vanderbilt University as tenured professor and endowed chair of education.

== Scholarship ==
Milner is known for his work on urban education, teacher preparation, and analyses of ways in which racial identity and socioeconomic status structure access to education opportunity. His body of scholarship includes at least 70 peer-reviewed journal articles, 2 books and 4 edited volumes. Of note are his 2010 publication, Start Where You Are But Don't Stay There: Understanding Diversity, Opportunity Gaps, and Teaching in Today’s Classrooms (Harvard Education Press). This book was awarded the 2011 American Educational Studies Association Critics Choice Book Award and the 2012 American Association of Colleges for Teacher Education Outstanding Book Award. In 2015, Milner published Rac(e)ing to Class: Confronting Poverty and Race in Schools and Classrooms (Harvard Education Press). In 2014, Milner co-edited The Handbook of Urban Education (Routledge), with Kofi Lomotey.

== Selected publications ==
- Milner, H. R. (November 13, 2014). "Not All Students Have Access to Homework Help". The New York Times.
- Milner, H. R. (March 2013). "Analyzing poverty, learning, and teaching through a critical race theory lens". Review of Research in Education. 37 (1): 1–53. doi:10.3102/0091732X12459720. S2CID 146634183.
- Milner, H. R. (September 2012). "Beyond a test score: Explaining opportunity gaps in educational practice". Journal of Black Studies. 43 (6): 693–718. doi:10.1177/0021934712442539. S2CID 145648751.
- Milner, H. R. (October 2007). "Race, culture, and researcher positionality: Working through dangers seen, unseen, and unforeseen". Educational Researcher. 36 (7): 388–400. doi:10.3102/0013189X07309471. S2CID 45442617.
- Milner, H. R. (July 2006). "Preservice teachers' learning about cultural and racial diversity: Implications for urban education". Urban Education. 41 (4): 343–375. doi:10.1177/0042085906289709. S2CID 145540233.

Cultural offices
| Preceded by Na'ilah Suad Nasir | President of the American Educational Research Association; 2022–2023 | Succeeded by Tyrone Howard |
