= Stephen John Quaye =

American academic

- Born: 1980 (age 45–46)
- Title: Professor; Associate Dean for Excellence in Graduate and Postdoctoral Training

Academic background
- Education: James Madison University (BSc, 2002); Miami University (MSc, 2004); Pennsylvania State University (PhD, 2008)
- Thesis: Pedagogy and racialized ways of knowing: Students and faculty engage racial realities in postsecondary classrooms
- Doctoral advisor: Shaun R. Harper, Lisa R. Lattuca
- Other advisors: Robert D. Reason, E. Paul Durrenberger, Dorothy H. Evensen

Academic work
- Institutions: Ohio State University

Stephen John Quaye (born 1980) is an American academic in the field of educational studies. His research focuses on equity, higher education and student affairs, and social justice. Quaye is a professor in the Higher Education and Student Affairs Program within the Department of Educational Studies at the Ohio State University. He is also the university's Associate Dean for Excellence in Graduate and Postdoctoral Training and associate editor of the Journal of Diversity in Higher Education. Quaye previously served as the president of American College Personnel Association: College Student Educators International (ACPA).

== Education ==
Quaye received a Bachelor of Science from James Madison University in 2002, a Master of Science in College Student Personnel from Miami University in 2004, and a Doctor of Philosophy in Higher Education from the Pennsylvania State University in 2008. His dissertation, titled "Pedagogy and Racialized Ways of Knowing: Students and Faculty Engage Racial Realities in Postsecondary Classrooms", received the 2009 NASPA Melvene D. Hardee Dissertation of the Year Award.

== Career ==
In 2008, Routledge published Student Engagement in Higher Education, which Quaye co-edited with Shaun R. Harper; a second edition was published in 2014, and a third published in 2019 with the edition of co-editor Sumun L. Pendakur.

After receiving his Ph.D. from Pennsylvania State University in 2008, Quaye took a position as an assistant professor at the University of Maryland. While there, he was named an ACPA Emerging Scholar (2009) and received an Annuit Coeptis award. He joined the Student Affairs in Higher Education Program at Miami University in August 2012.

From 2017-18, Quaye served as president of the ACPA.

In 2019, Routledge published Identity-Based Student Activism, which Quaye co-wrote with Chris Linder, Alex C. Lange, Meg E. Evans, and Terah J. Stewart. The same year, Michigan State University Press published Rise Up!: Activism as Education, which Quaye co-wrote with Amalia Dache, Chris Linder, and Keon M. McGuire.

Quaye was honored with Ohio State’s Alumni Award for Distinguished Teaching in early 2023. In August of that year, he was appointed to the new position of Associate Dean for Excellence in Graduate and Postdoctoral Training. He is also the program chair for Higher Education and Students Affairs in the university's College of Education and Human Ecology.

== Books ==
- Harper, Shaun R.; Quaye, Stephen John, eds. (2009). Student engagement in higher education: theoretical perspectives and practical approaches for diverse populations. New York, NY: Routledge. ISBN 978-0-415-98851-3.
  - Quaye, Stephen John; Harper, Shaun R., eds. (2014-08-15). Student Engagement in Higher Education (2nd ed.). Routledge. doi:10.4324/9780203810163. ISBN 978-1-136-68020-5.
  - Quaye, Stephen John; Harper, Shaun R.; Pendakur, Sumun L., eds. (2019-11-27). Student Engagement in Higher Education (3rd ed.). Routledge. doi:10.4324/9780429400698. ISBN 978-0-429-68346-6. S2CID 242203156.
- Dache, Amalia; Quaye, Stephen John; Linder, Chris; McGuire, Keon M. (2019-09-01). Rise Up!: Activism as Education. Michigan State University Press. ISBN 978-1-61186-324-6.
- Linder, Chris; Quaye, Stephen John; Lange, Alex C.; Evans, Meg E.; Stewart, Terah J. (2019-10-11). Identity-Based Student Activism: Power and Oppression on College Campuses. Routledge. ISBN 978-0-429-55260-1.
