= Urban Education =

- Discipline: Education
- Language: English
- Edited by: H. Richard Milner

Publication details
- History: 1965-present
- Publisher: SAGE Publications
- Frequency: Bimonthly
- Impact factor: 2.1 (2017)

Standard abbreviations
- ISO 4: Urban Educ.

Indexing
- ISSN: 0042-0859 (print); 1552-8340 (web)
- LCCN: 64009467
- OCLC no.: 41213228

Links
- Journal homepage; Online access; Online archive

Urban Education is a bimonthly peer-reviewed academic journal that covers the field of urban education. The journal's editor-in-chief is H. Richard Milner (Vanderbilt University). It was established in 1965 and is published by SAGE Publications.

== Abstracting and indexing ==
The journal is abstracted and indexed in Scopus and the Social Sciences Citation Index. According to the Journal Citation Reports, its 2017 impact factor is 2.1, ranking it 14th out of 40 journals in the category "Urban Studies" and 49th out of 238 journals in the category "Education & Educational Research".
