= Bad hombre =

Bad Hombre is an album by Antonio Sánchez.

Bad hombre(s) may also refer to:

- Bad Hombre (production company), a film production company
- Bad Hombres, a film about Tecolotes de Nuevo Laredo
- "Bad hombres", a quote by Donald Trump in the third of the 2016 presidential debates
  - Bad Hombres, Nasty Women, a song by Gregory Brothers that samples said debate
