= Shaun R. Harper =

American educationalist

Shaun Harper
- Born: October 26, 1975 (age 51); Thomasville, Georgia, U.S.
- Education: Indiana University Bloomington Ph.D.
- Alma mater: Albany State University
- Occupation: University professor
- Spouse: Shawn K. Hill
- Writing career
- Subjects: Race and Racism, Racial Equity, Gender Equity, Higher Education, DEI, Business

Shaun Harper (born October 26, 1975) is an American scholar on diversity, equity, and inclusion in the United States. He is a Provost Professor in the Rossier School of Education, Marshall School of Business, and Price School of Public Policy at the University of Southern California.

== Career ==
Harper began his career as a student affairs professional at Indiana University. From 2000 to 2003, he served as Assistant Director of MBA Admissions for the Indiana University Kelley School of Business. In 2003, he became Executive Director of the Doctor of Education (Ed.D.) Programs at the University of Southern California Rossier School of Education, where he also served as an assistant professor. He moved to Penn State University in 2005, where he was an assistant professor and research associate in the Center for the Study of Higher Education. Harper joined the University of Pennsylvania Graduate School of Education faculty in 2007, where he earned tenure and was promoted to associate professor in 2011. He founded the Center for the Study of Race & Equity in Education that same year. He was promoted to professor in 2016. He returned to the University of Southern California in July 2017 as the Clifford and Betty Allen Chair in Urban Leadership and founding executive director of the USC Race and Equity Center.

Harper has testified twice to the United States House of Representatives and spoken at numerous White House convenings. He was on Barack Obama’s My Brother’s Keeper Advisory Council, on the national education policy committee for the Biden-Harris Campaign, and on California Governor Gavin Newsom’s statewide task force on education, racial equity, and COVID-19 recovery.

In 2022, he was appointed University Professor at the University of Southern California. Dr. Harper also is the Clifford and Betty Allen Chair in Urban Leadership, founder and executive director of the USC Race and Equity Center, a past president of the American Educational Research Association, a past president of the Association for the Study of Higher Education, and a 2020-21 editor-at-large of TIME magazine. He spent a decade at the University of Pennsylvania, where he was a tenured professor and founding executive director of the Center for the Study of Race & Equity in Education.

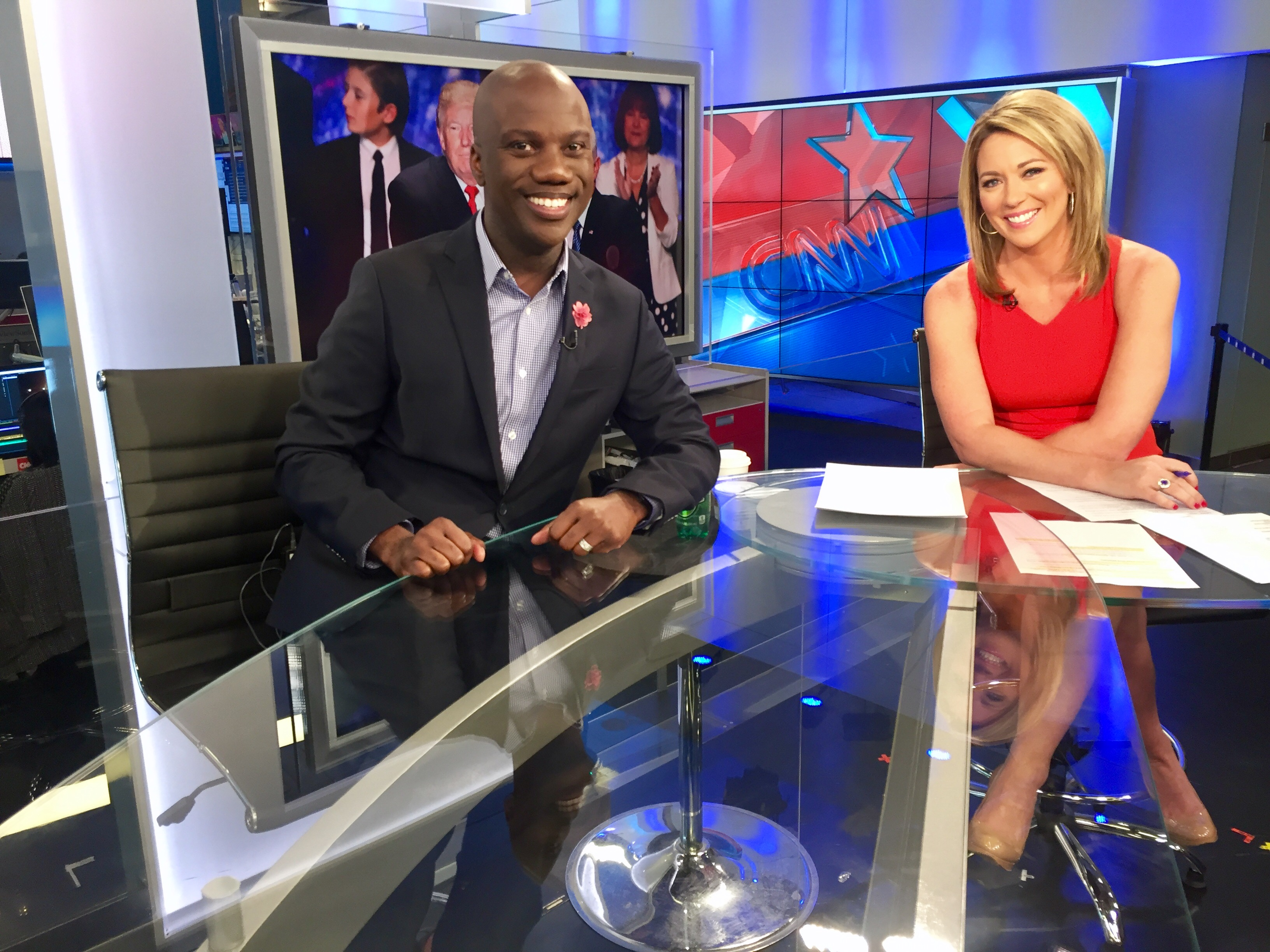
Shaun Harper at CNN

The New York Times, Los Angeles Times, Washington Post, Wall Street Journal, Sports Illustrated, Chronicle of Higher Education, Inside Higher Ed, and other news outlets have quoted Professor Harper and featured his research. He has been interviewed on CNN, MSNBC, CNBC, ESPN, PBS NewsHour, and NPR.

Cultural offices
Preceded by Vanessa Siddle Walker	President of the American Educational Research Association; 2020–2021	Succeeded by Na'ilah Suad Nasir
