= Tyrone Howard =

American educator, academic, and author

Tyrone C. Howard
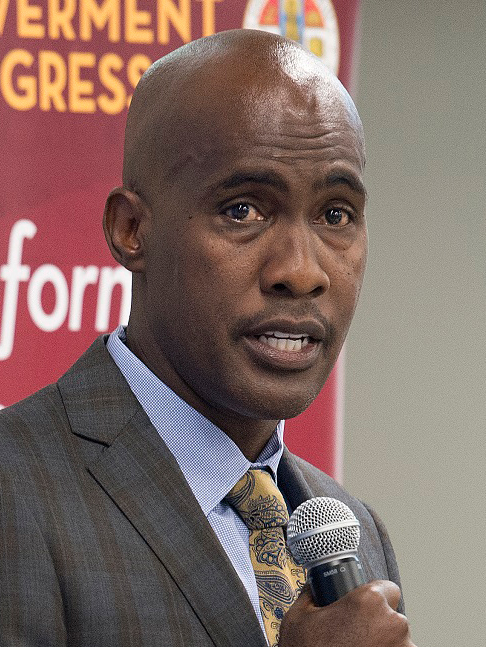
- Howard in 2019
- Born: Compton, California
- Occupations: Educator, academic and author

Academic background
- Education: University of California, Irvine; California State University, Dominguez Hills; University of Washington, Seattle

Tyrone C. Howard is an American educator, academic, and author. He is a professor of Education in the School of Education and Information Studies and the Founder and executive director of the Black Male Institute at the University of California, Los Angeles. He also serves as the Pritzker Family Endowed Chair in Education to Strengthen Children & Families, Faculty Director of UCLA Center for the Transformation of Schools, as well as Director of UCLA Pritzker Center for Strengthening Children & Families.

Howard is most known for his work in urban education, K-12 teacher education, educational sociology, and the impact of race, gender, social class, and culture on teaching and learning. He has authored books, including, Black Male(d) Peril and Promise in the Education of African American Males (2014), Expanding College Access for Urban Youth (2016), All Students must Thrive (2019), and No More Teaching Without Positive Relationships. He is the recipient of the UCLA Distinguished Teaching Award and the AERA Social Justice in education research award.

Howard is a member of the National Academy of Education (NAEd). Howard is also a Fellow of the American Educational Research Association (AERA), and National Academy of Education (NAED).

== Education ==
Howard obtained his B.A. in Economics from the University of California Irvine in 1990. He then completed an M.A. in education from California State University Dominguez Hills in 1994, and obtained his Ph.D. in Curriculum & Instruction in 1998 from the University of Washington/Seattle.

== Career ==
In 1991, Howard began his career as a classroom teacher at Longfellow Elementary School in Compton, where he served until 1994. In 1998, he was appointed as an assistant professor in the College of Education at Ohio State University and held that appointment until 2001. He joined the University of California, Los Angeles (UCLA) as an assistant professor in the Graduate School of Education and Information Studies in 2001, served as an assistant professor from 2001 to 2005, and was promoted to associate professor in 2005. Since 2011, he has been holding an appointment as a professor of education in the School of Education & Information Studies at UCLA. In 2022, he was elected president of the American Educational Research Association.

Howard served as the Faculty Director of Center X from 2008 to 2015 and subsequently held the position of Associate Dean for Diversity, Equity & Inclusion at the Graduate School of Education & Information Studies from 2015 to 2018 at UCLA. He founded the Black Male Institute at UCLA in 2010 and has held the position of Executive Director since then. In addition, he has been serving as the Director of the UCLA Pritzker Center for Strengthening Children & Families since 2017 and Pritzker Family Endowed Chair in Education to Strengthen Children & Families since 2018. In 2022 Howard was elected president of the American Educational Research Association.

== Research ==
Howard has published over 100 peer-reviewed journal articles, book chapters, and technical reports. His research focuses on investigating and addressing issues pertaining to race, culture, access, and educational opportunities for student populations that have historically been marginalized or minoritized.

=== Culturally-responsive pedagogy ===
In his early research, Howard emphasized the need to better equip European American teachers to effectively instruct ethnically diverse students of color. His research has concentrated on developing strategies to enhance the effectiveness of teacher education programs, ensuring that preservice teachers possess the essential skills to work successfully with diverse student populations. He also addressed the resistance and apprehension often observed among students in teacher education programs regarding issues related to diversity and race. In 2001, he conducted research on effective teaching practices for African American students, emphasizing holistic development and cultural responsiveness. His findings revealed the applicability of these strategies to all teachers willing to critically examine assumptions, beliefs, and stereotypes. In related research, he analyzed African American males' schooling experiences using race based frameworks and observed their awareness of the impact of race and racism. Primarily focusing on urban contexts, he examined African-American elementary students' perceptions of culturally relevant teaching and revealed that students preferred caring teachers who created a community-like classroom environment and made learning fun.

=== Race, education, and equity ===
Having focused his research on race, education, and equity, Howard has investigated faculty experiences, the impact of racial climate on black students, and the relevance of Critical Race Theory, highlighting systemic racism within academic institutions and emphasizing the need for equity and inclusion in education.

One of Howard's highly cited works determined that culturally relevant pedagogy requires critical teacher reflection to incorporate issues of equity and social justice into teaching practice. In his book, Why Race & Culture Matters in Schools, he highlighted the importance of race and culture in shaping students' school experiences, shared insights from successful schools that closed the achievement gap, and also emphasized how greater awareness of race and culture improved educational outcomes. In their book review, Vershawn Ashanti Young and Y’Shanda Young-Rivera commented, "Howard’s text helps readers... make sense of the genesis and doggedness of these racial disparities as well as the necessity of understanding these trends. He also offers solutions in the form of steps educators can take toward becoming racially aware and culturally competent". He also explored the chronic underperformance of African American males in U.S. schools, addressing historical, structural, educational, psychological, emotional, and cultural factors in his book, Black Male(d): Peril and Promise in the Education of African American Males and advocated for a paradigm shift in thinking, teaching, and studying Black males. Having reviewed this book, Young, and Young-Rivera highlighted, "His meticulously crafted work provides current perspectives of Black male students, a historical overview, a discussion of the role of sports and popular culture, and the voices of Black males themselves on issues of masculinity, race, class, and success."

== Awards and honors ==
- 2017 – Fellow, American Educational Research Association
- 2017 – Mentorship Award, American Educational Research Association (AERA) Division G: Social Context of Education
- 2019 – Member, National Academy of Education
- 2022 – Research Award, AERA Social Justice

== Selected publications ==
=== Books ===
- Black male(d): Peril and Promise in the Education of African American Males (2014) ISBN 9780807754917
- Expanding College Access for Urban Youth (2016) ISBN 9780807774762
- All Students Must Thrive (2019) ISBN 9781328027047
- Why Race and Culture Matter in Schools (2019) ISBN 9780807778074
- No More Teaching Without Positive Relationships (2020) ISBN 9780325120492

=== Articles ===
- Gay, G., & Howard, T. C. (2000). Multicultural teacher education for the 21st century. The teacher educator, 36(1), 1–16.
- Howard, T. C. (2001). Telling their side of the story: African-American students' perceptions of culturally relevant teaching. The Urban Review, 33, 131–149.
- Howard, T. C. (2003). Culturally relevant pedagogy: Ingredients for critical teacher reflection. Theory into practice, 42(3), 195–202.
- Howard, T. C. (2008). Who cares? The disenfranchisement of African American males in preK-12 schools: A critical race theory perspective. Teachers college record, 110(5), 954–985.
- Jayakumar, U. M., Howard, T. C., Allen, W. R., & Han, J. C. (2009). Racial privilege in the professoriate: An exploration of campus climate, retention, and satisfaction. The Journal of Higher
- Howard, T. C. (2001). Powerful pedagogy for African American students: A case of four teachers. Urban education, 36(2), 179–202.
