= ATP-binding domain of ABC transporters =

Water-soluble domain of transmembrane ABC transporters

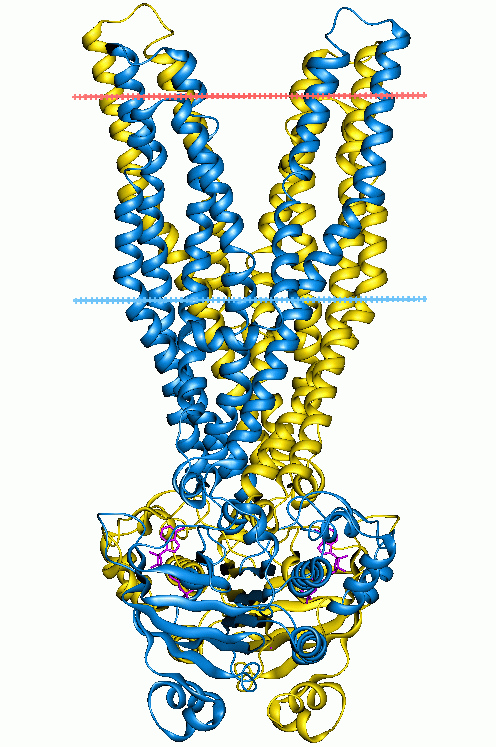
- Multidrug ABC transporter SAV1866, closed state

Identifiers
- Symbol: ABC_tran
- Pfam: PF00005
- InterPro: IPR003439
- PROSITE: PDOC00185
- SCOP2: 1b0u / SCOPe / SUPFAM
- TCDB: 3.A.1
- OPM superfamily: 17
- OPM protein: 2hyd
- CDD: cd00267
Available protein structures:
- PDB: 1vplA:29-210 1g9xA:33-229 1g6hA:33-229 1gajA:33-229 1ji0A:31-214 1z47A:29-210 2awnA:29-210 1q1bD:29-210 1q12A:29-210 2awoC:29-210 1q1eA:29-210 1vciA:38-219 1v43A:38-219 1g292:29-216 1oxsC:31-217 1oxvA:31-217 1oxtA:31-217 1oxuC:31-217 1oxxK:31-217 1b0uA:32-229 1f3oA:31-221 1l2tA:31-221 1l7vC:26-209 1z2rG:369-554 1pf4D:369-554 2ap2P:1103-1116 1mv5A:375-560 1xefC:495-679 1mt0A:495-679 1jj7A:531-718 1ckwA:497-522 1ckxA:497-522 1ckyA:497-522 1ckzA:497-522 1xmiB:451-622 2bbsA:451-622 2bbtA:451-622 1nbd :451-622 1xmjA:451-622 2bboA:451-622 1r0wD:451-622 1xfaA:451-622 1r0xB:451-622 1r0zB:451-622 1q3hD:451-622 1xf9B:451-622 1r0yA:451-622 1r10A:451-622 1yqtA:99-286 1sgwA:27-190 2d3wA:27-222 2d2fA:29-220 2d2eA:29-220 IPR003439 PF00005 (ECOD; PDBsum)
- AlphaFold: IPR003439; PF00005

In molecular biology, ATP-binding domain of ABC transporters is a water-soluble domain of transmembrane ABC transporters.

ABC transporters belong to the ATP-Binding Cassette superfamily, which uses the hydrolysis of ATP to translocate a variety of compounds across biological membranes. ABC transporters are minimally constituted of two conserved regions: a highly conserved ATP binding cassette (ABC) and a less conserved transmembrane domain (TMD). These regions can be found on the same protein or on two different ones. Most ABC transporters function as a dimer and therefore are constituted of four domains, two ABC modules and two TMDs.

== Biological function ==
ABC transporters are involved in the export or import of a wide variety of substrates ranging from small ions to macromolecules. The major function of ABC import systems is to provide essential nutrients to bacteria. They are found only in prokaryotes and their four constitutive domains are usually encoded by independent polypeptides (two ABC proteins and two TMD proteins). Prokaryotic importers require additional extracytoplasmic binding proteins (one or more per systems) for function. In contrast, export systems are involved in the extrusion of noxious substances, the export of extracellular toxins and the targeting of membrane components. They are found in all living organisms and in general the TMD is fused to the ABC module in a variety of combinations. Some eukaryotic exporters encode the four domains on the same polypeptide chain.

== Amino acid sequence ==
The ABC module (approximately two hundred amino acid residues) is known to bind and hydrolyze ATP, thereby coupling transport to ATP hydrolysis in a large number of biological processes. The cassette is duplicated in several subfamilies. Its primary sequence is highly conserved, displaying a typical phosphate-binding loop: Walker A, and a magnesium binding site: Walker B. Besides these two regions, three other conserved motifs are present in the ABC cassette: the switch region which contains a histidine loop, postulated to polarize the attacking water molecule for hydrolysis, the signature conserved motif (LSGGQ) specific to the ABC transporter, and the Q-motif (between Walker A and the signature), which interacts with the gamma phosphate through a water bond. The Walker A, Walker B, Q-loop and switch region form the nucleotide binding site.

== 3D structure ==
The 3D structure of a monomeric ABC module adopts a stubby L-shape with two distinct arms. ArmI (mainly beta-strand) contains Walker A and Walker B. The important residues for ATP hydrolysis and/or binding are located in the P-loop. The ATP-binding pocket is located at the extremity of armI. The perpendicular armII contains mostly the alpha helical subdomain with the signature motif. It only seems to be required for structural integrity of the ABC module. ArmII is in direct contact with the TMD. The hinge between armI and armII contains both the histidine loop and the Q-loop, making contact with the gamma phosphate of the ATP molecule. ATP hydrolysis leads to a conformational change that could facilitate ADP release. In the dimer the two ABC cassettes contact each other through hydrophobic interactions at the antiparallel beta-sheet of armI by a two-fold axis.

== Human proteins containing this domain ==
ABCA1; ABCA10; ABCA12; ABCA13; ABCA2; ABCA3; ABCA4; ABCA5; ABCA6; ABCA7; ABCA8; ABCA9; ABCB1; ABCB10; ABCB11; ABCB4; ABCB5; ABCB6; ABCB7; ABCB8; ABCB9; ABCC1; ABCC10; ABCC11; ABCC12; ABCC2; ABCC3; ABCC4; ABCC5; ABCC6; ABCC8; ABCC9; ABCD1; ABCD2; ABCD3; ABCD4; ABCE1; ABCF1; ABCF2; ABCF3; ABCG1; ABCG2; ABCG4; ABCG5; ABCG8; CFTR; TAP1; TAP2; TAPL;
