= Hsa-piR-1082 =

piwi-interacting RNA (piRNA) belongs to the small RNA class found in eukaryotic organisms, their major role is to regulate the expression of genes by the mRNA degradation or silencing. After the association with argonaute protein family, these short RNA guide the RNA-induced silencing complex (RISC) to their target by sequence complementarity. piRNAs have approximately from 26 to 31 nucleotides and are found in almost all metazoans.

This hsa-piR-1082, found in samples from human germinative tissues, align to human genome only once. This alignment has overlap with a coding gene, in this case ABCA2. This gene that already is described being high expressed in nervous system and is associated to lipid transport and, more interesting, resistance to anti-tumor drugs. Furthermore, a study found that the low expression on this genes can cause inhibition of prostate tumor metastasis on mouse.

One recent research found the hsa-piR-1082 (NCBI code: piR-31106) in high expression on breast cell lines and tumoral biopsies. Although there are indications of the relations between this specific piRNA and its putative gene target, more studies need to be done to provide reliable relation about these cellular components. However, it is a probably candidate to future researches.
