= Elisabeth P. Carpenter =

British biologist

- Died: 10 November 2026
- Education: University of Cambridge; Birkbeck, University of London
- Scientific career
- Workplaces: University of Oxford; Imperial College London; Diamond Light Source

Elisabeth P. Carpenter (died 10 November 2026) was a British structural biologist who was a professor at the Nuffield Department of Medicine in Oxford. She solved the three-dimensional structure of human membrane proteins using X-ray crystallography. Carpenter used X-ray crystallography to understand the atomic positions within proteins.

== Early life and education ==
Carpenter studied biochemistry at the University of Cambridge from 1981 to 1985. She moved to Birkbeck, University of London for doctoral research from 1985 to 1989, where she studied biochemistry and crystallography. After completing her doctorate, Carpenter worked at the National Institute for Medical Research in Mill Hill and at Imperial College London, and solved the structures of proteins involved in DNA repair. She also investigated toxoplasmosis and muscle movement.

== Career ==
She established the Membrane Protein Laboratory at the Diamond Light Source in 2008. Subsequently, from 2009 to 2020, she worked at the Structural Genomics Consortium at the University of Oxford with a focus on human membrane proteins.

== Research ==
Carpenter is interested in understanding the structure and function of proteins. She studies proteins embedded within cell membranes. The proteins are large hydrophobic surfaces, and understanding their structure is an important step in unravelling the processes of molecules and signals across cell membranes.

Carpenter was the first to describe the structure of the human ABC-transporter ABCB10, a mitochondrial protein that is important in the production of heme. She has studied premature ageing syndromes that are caused by failure of the lamin proteins, and the role of the metalloprotease ZMPSTE24. She has also studied human two-pore potassium channels (K2Ps), protein that gives rise to the background leak current that contributes to membrane potential.

== Selected publications ==
- Carpenter, Elisabeth; Beis, Konstantinos; Cameron, Alexander; So Iwata (2008). "Overcoming the challenges of membrane protein crystallography". Current Opinion in Structural Biology. 18 (5): 581–586. doi:10.1016/j.sbi.2008.07.001. PMC 2580798. PMID 18674618. Wikidata Q34803434.
- Simone Weyand; Tatsuro Shimamura; Shunsuke Yajima; et al. (2008). "Structure and molecular mechanism of a nucleobase-cation-symport-1 family transporter". Science. 322 (5902): 709–713. Bibcode:2008Sci...322..709W. doi:10.1126/science.1164440. PMC 2885439. PMID 18927357. Wikidata Q27652531.
- Newstead, Simon; Drew, David; Cameron, Alexander; et al. (2010). "Crystal structure of a prokaryotic homologue of the mammalian oligopeptide-proton symporters, PepT1 and PepT2". The EMBO Journal. 30 (2): 417–426. doi:10.1038/emboj.2010.309. PMC 3025455. PMID 21131908. Wikidata Q27666182.
