= ABCG4 =

Protein-coding gene in the species Homo sapiens

Identifiers
- Aliases: ABCG4, WHITE2, ATP binding cassette subfamily G member 4
- External IDs: OMIM: 607784; MGI: 1890594; GeneCards: ABCG4

Gene location (Human)
| Chr. | Chromosome 11 (human) |
| Band | 11q23.3 | Start | 119,149,052 bp |
| Band | 11q23.3 | End | 119,162,653 bp |

Gene location (Mouse)
| Chr. | Chromosome 9 (mouse) |
| Band | 9|9 A5.2 | Start | 44,184,485 bp |
| Band | 9|9 A5.2 | End | 44,199,912 bp |
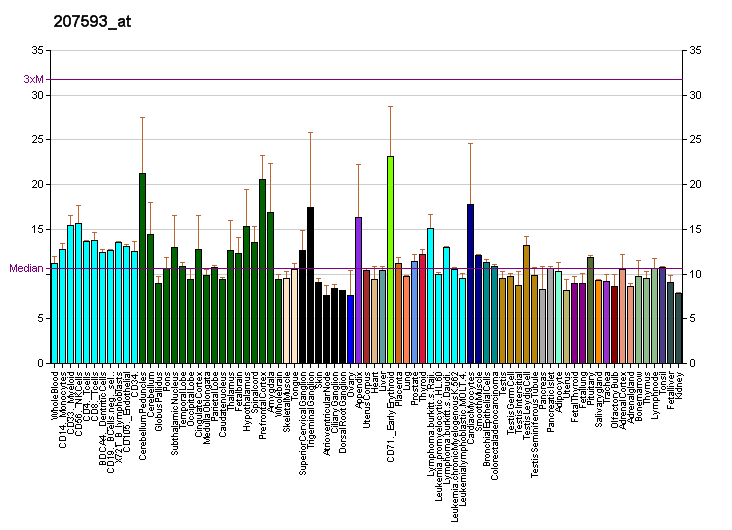
RNA expression pattern
| Bgee | Human / Mouse (ortholog); Top expressed in: right hemisphere of cerebellum; right frontal lobe; prefrontal cortex; lateral nuclear group of thalamus; oocyte; primary visual cortex; secondary oocyte; dorsolateral prefrontal cortex; Brodmann area 9; anterior cingulate cortex / Top expressed in: neural layer of retina; superior frontal gyrus; cerebellar cortex; primary visual cortex; dentate gyrus of hippocampal formation granule cell; superior colliculus; dorsal tegmental nucleus; habenula; nucleus of stria terminalis; subiculum; More reference expression data |
| BioGPS | More reference expression data |
Gene ontology
| Molecular function | nucleotide binding; ATPase activity; protein binding; ATP binding; cholesterol transfer activity; protein homodimerization activity; ABC-type sterol transporter activity; protein heterodimerization activity; ATPase-coupled transmembrane transporter activity |
| Cellular component | integral component of membrane; plasma membrane; membrane |
| Biological process | transmembrane transport; cholesterol efflux; cellular response to leukemia inhibitory factor; cholesterol transport |
Sources:Amigo / QuickGO
Orthologs
| Databases | NCBI: entry; OMA: entry |
| Species | Human | Mouse |
| Entrez | 64137 | 192663 |
| Ensembl | ENSG00000172350 | ENSMUSG00000032131 |
| UniProt | Q9H172 | Q91WA9 |
| RefSeq (mRNA) | NM_001142505; NM_022169; NM_001348191; NM_001348192 | NM_138955 |
| RefSeq (protein) | NP_001135977; NP_071452; NP_001335120; NP_001335121 | NP_620405 |
| Location (UCSC) | Chr 11: 119.15 – 119.16 Mb | Chr 9: 44.18 – 44.2 Mb |
| PubMed search |
- Wikidata
| View/Edit Human | View/Edit Mouse |

ATP-binding cassette sub-family G member 4 is a protein that in humans is encoded by the ABCG4 gene.

The protein encoded by this gene is included in the ATP-binding cassette transporter (ABC protein) superfamily. ABC proteins transport various molecules across extra- and intra-cellular membranes. ABC genes are divided into seven distinct subfamilies (ABC1, MDR/TAP, MRP, ALD, OABP, GCN20, White). This protein is a member of the White subfamily and is expressed predominantly in liver tissue. The function has not yet been determined but may involve cholesterol transport. Alternate splice variants have been described but their full length sequences have not been determined.

ABCG4 has demonstrated, in vitro, to participate in the efflux of desmosterol and amyloid-β peptide (Aβ). It is highly expressed in the brain, but its localization and function at the blood-brain barrier (BBB) level remain unknown.

== See also ==
- ATP-binding cassette transporter
