= ATPase assay =

Membrane assay

The ATPase assay is a membrane assay that indirectly measures the activity of efflux transporters. ATP Binding Cassette or efflux transporters mediate the transport of substrates across cell membranes against a concentration gradient. ATP cleavage is tightly linked to substrate translocation, as the energy for the substrate translocation is derived from ATP hydrolysis. ATP hydrolysis yields inorganic phosphate (Pi), which can be measured by a simple colorimetric reaction. The amount of Pi liberated is directly proportional to the activity of the transporter.

== Use of ATPase Assay ==
The ATPase assay is designed to indicate the nature of the interaction between the compound and the transporter. The ATPase assays are used in two different modes: ATPase activation and ATPase inhibition. Transported substrates increase baseline ATPase activity, while inhibitors or slowly transported compounds inhibit baseline ATPase activity and/or the ATPase activity measured in the presence of a stimulating agent. The ATPase assays can therefore have the potential for determining whether a compound acts as a transporter substrate and/or inhibitor.

Mutations in the ATPase domain result in loss of transport function. The activity of the multidrug transporter in drug-resistant cells is associated with rapid cellular ATP depletion when ATP synthesis is inhibited.
