= ABCC10 =

Protein-coding gene in the species Homo sapiens

Identifiers
- Aliases: ABCC10, EST182763, MRP7, SIMRP7, ATP binding cassette subfamily C member 10
- External IDs: OMIM: 612509; MGI: 2386976; GeneCards: ABCC10
Enzyme activity
EC #	BRENDA	ExPASy	KEGG	MetaCyc
7.6.2.2	↗	↗	↗	↗
7.6.2.3	↗	↗	↗	↗

Gene location (Human)
Chr.	Chromosome 6 (human)
Band	6p21.1	Start	43,427,366 bp
Band	6p21.1	End	43,450,427 bp

Gene location (Mouse)
Chr.	Chromosome 17 (mouse)
Band	17|17 C	Start	46,614,147 bp
Band	17|17 C	End	46,639,278 bp
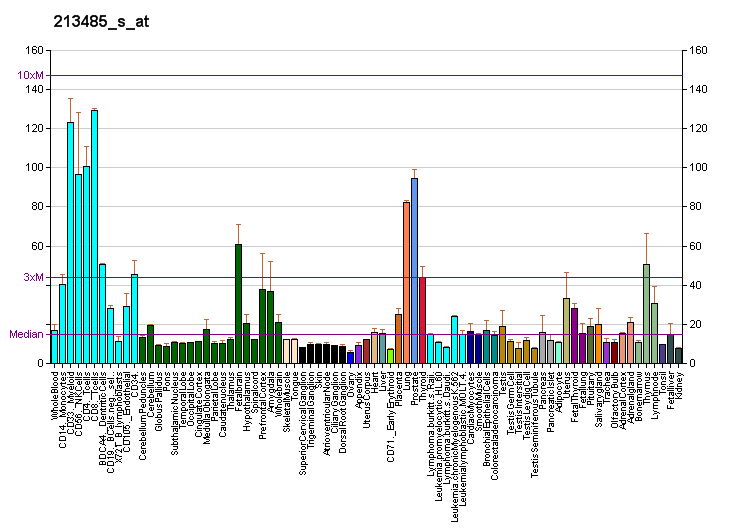

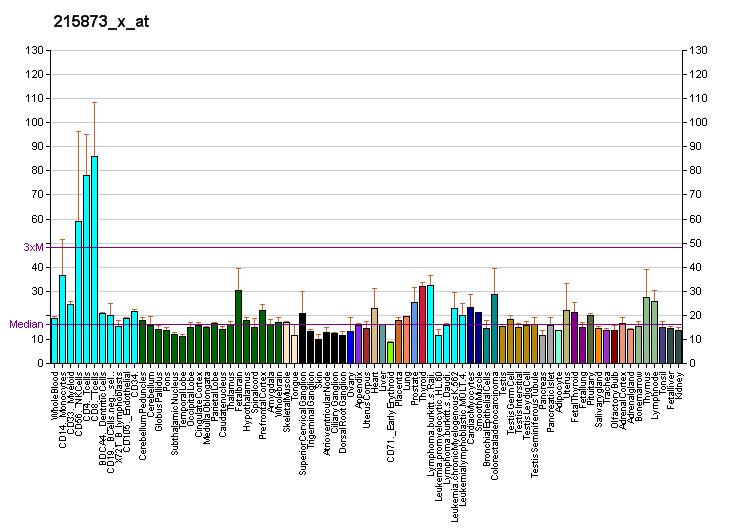
RNA expression pattern
Bgee	Human / Mouse (ortholog); Top expressed in: right hemisphere of cerebellum; granulocyte; right ovary; pituitary gland; anterior pituitary; right adrenal cortex; apex of heart; left ovary; epithelium of nasopharynx; right frontal lobe / Top expressed in: substantia nigra; trigeminal ganglion; yolk sac; spermatocyte; neural layer of retina; right kidney; duodenum; proximal tubule; ascending aorta; secondary oocyte; More reference expression data
BioGPS	More reference expression data
Gene ontology
Molecular function	nucleotide binding; ATPase activity; ATP binding; ATPase-coupled inorganic anion transmembrane transporter activity; ATPase-coupled transmembrane transporter activity
Cellular component	integral component of membrane; lysosomal membrane; plasma membrane; membrane; integral component of plasma membrane
Biological process	transmembrane transport; transport
Sources:Amigo / QuickGO
Orthologs
Databases	NCBI: entry; OMA: entry
Species	Human	Mouse
Entrez	89845	224814
Ensembl	ENSG00000124574	ENSMUSG00000032842
UniProt	Q5T3U5	Q8R4P9
RefSeq (mRNA)	NM_001198934; NM_033450; NM_001350518	NM_145140; NM_170680; NM_001347396
RefSeq (protein)	NP_001185863; NP_258261; NP_001337447	NP_001334325; NP_660122; NP_733780
Location (UCSC)	Chr 6: 43.43 – 43.45 Mb	Chr 17: 46.61 – 46.64 Mb
PubMed search
- Wikidata
View/Edit Human	View/Edit Mouse

Multidrug resistance-associated protein 7 is a protein that in humans is encoded by the ABCC10 gene.

The protein encoded by this gene is a member of the superfamily of ATP-binding cassette (ABC) transporters. ABC proteins transport various molecules across extra- and intra-cellular membranes. ABC genes are divided into seven distinct subfamilies (ABC1, MDR/TAP, MRP, ALD, OABP, GCN20, and White). This ABC full-transporter is a member of the MRP subfamily which is involved in multi-drug resistance. Alternative splicing of this gene results in multiple transcript variants; however, not all variants have been fully described.

== See also ==
- ATP-binding cassette transporter
