= ABCA5 =

Protein-coding gene in the species Homo sapiens

Identifiers
- Aliases: ABCA5, ABC13, EST90625, ATP binding cassette subfamily A member 5, HTC3
- External IDs: OMIM: 612503; MGI: 2386607; GeneCards: ABCA5

Gene location (Human)
Chr.	Chromosome 17 (human)
Band	17q24.3	Start	69,244,311 bp
Band	17q24.3	End	69,327,244 bp

Gene location (Mouse)
Chr.	Chromosome 11 (mouse)
Band	11|11 E1	Start	110,160,195 bp
Band	11|11 E1	End	110,228,542 bp
RNA expression pattern
Bgee	Human / Mouse (ortholog); Top expressed in: body of pancreas; Achilles tendon; gastrocnemius muscle; cerebellar hemisphere; bronchial epithelial cell; right hemisphere of cerebellum; skin of thigh; right lobe of liver; jejunal mucosa; skin of abdomen / Top expressed in: otolith organ; utricle; facial motor nucleus; olfactory epithelium; substantia nigra; seminal vesicula; pontine nuclei; spermatocyte; medial vestibular nucleus; Epithelium of choroid plexus; More reference expression data
BioGPS	n/a
Gene ontology
Molecular function	nucleotide binding; ATPase activity; ATP binding; lipid transporter activity; ATPase-coupled transmembrane transporter activity
Cellular component	integral component of membrane; endosome; late endosome; Golgi apparatus; intracellular membrane-bounded organelle; late endosome membrane; membrane; Golgi membrane; lysosome; lysosomal membrane
Biological process	lipid transport; high-density lipoprotein particle remodeling; cholesterol efflux; negative regulation of macrophage derived foam cell differentiation; reverse cholesterol transport; cholesterol transport; transmembrane transport
Sources:Amigo / QuickGO
Orthologs
Databases	NCBI: entry; OMA: entry
Species	Human	Mouse
Entrez	23461	217265
Ensembl	ENSG00000154265	ENSMUSG00000018800
UniProt	Q8WWZ7	Q8K448
RefSeq (mRNA)	NM_172232; NM_018672	NM_147219
RefSeq (protein)	NP_061142; NP_758424	NP_671752
Location (UCSC)	Chr 17: 69.24 – 69.33 Mb	Chr 11: 110.16 – 110.23 Mb
PubMed search
- Wikidata
View/Edit Human	View/Edit Mouse

Cholesterol transporter ABCA5 is a protein that in humans is encoded by the ABCA5 gene.

== Function ==
The membrane-associated protein encoded by this gene is a member of the superfamily of ATP-binding cassette (ABC) transporters. ABC proteins transport various molecule across extra- and intracellular membranes. This encoded protein is a member of the ABCA subfamily. Members of the ABCA subfamily comprise the only major ABC subfamily found exclusively in multicellular eukaryotes. This gene is clustered among 4 other ABCA family members on 17q24. Alternative splicing of this gene results in several transcript variants; however, not all variants have been fully described. [provided by RefSeq, Jul 2008].

== Clinical significance ==
Mutations in ABCA5 cause excessive hair overgrowth.
