= Annamycin =

Chemical compound

Clinical data
- ATC code: none

Identifiers
- IUPAC name: (7S,9S)-7-[(2R,3R,4R,5R,6S)-4,5-dihydroxy-3-iodo- 6-methyloxan-2-yl]oxy-6,9,11-trihydroxy-9- (2-hydroxyacetyl)-8,10-dihydro-7H-tetracene-5,12-dione
- CAS Number: 92689-49-1
- PubChem CID: 115212
- ChemSpider: 103088
- UNII: SNU299M83Q
- KEGG: D12844
- CompTox Dashboard (EPA): DTXSID901027238
- ECHA InfoCard: 100.235.298

Chemical and physical data
- Formula: C_{26}H_{25}IO_{11}
- Molar mass: 640.379 g·mol^{−1}
- 3D model (JSmol): Interactive image
- SMILES: O=C2c1c(O)c5c(c(O)c1C(=O)c3ccccc23)C[C@@](O)(C(=O)CO)C[C@@H]5O[C@@H]4O[C@H]([C@H](O)[C@@H](O)[C@H]4I)C
- InChI: InChI=1S/C26H25IO11/c1-9-19(30)24(35)18(27)25(37-9)38-13-7-26(36,14(29)8-28)6-12-15(13)23(34)17-16(22(12)33)20(31)10-4-2-3-5-11(10)21(17)32/h2-5,9,13,18-19,24-25,28,30,33-36H,6-8H2,1H3/t9-,13-,18+,19-,24-,25-,26-/m0/s1; Key:CIDNKDMVSINJCG-GKXONYSUSA-N

Annamycin is an anthracycline antibiotic being investigated for the treatment of cancer.
