= ABCA10 =

Protein-coding gene in the species Homo sapiens

Identifiers
- Aliases: ABCA10, EST698739, ATP binding cassette subfamily A member 10
- External IDs: OMIM: 612508; GeneCards: ABCA10

Gene location (Human)
| Chr. | Chromosome 17 (human) |
| Band | 17q24.3 | Start | 69,147,214 bp |
| Band | 17q24.3 | End | 69,244,846 bp |
RNA expression pattern
| Bgee | Human / Mouse (ortholog); Top expressed in: tibial nerve; sural nerve; left ovary; right ovary; Achilles tendon; right uterine tube; lactiferous gland; subcutaneous adipose tissue; gastric mucosa; left uterine tube / n/a; More reference expression data |
| BioGPS | n/a |
Gene ontology
| Molecular function | ATP binding; nucleotide binding; ATPase activity; ATPase-coupled transmembrane transporter activity; lipid transporter activity |
| Cellular component | integral component of membrane; intracellular membrane-bounded organelle; membrane |
| Biological process | lipid transport; transmembrane transport |
Sources:Amigo / QuickGO
Orthologs
| Databases | NCBI: entry; OMA: entry |
| Species | Human | Mouse |
| Entrez | 10349 | n/a |
| Ensembl | ENSG00000154263 | n/a |
| UniProt | Q8WWZ4 | n/a |
| RefSeq (mRNA) | NM_080282; NM_001377321 | n/a |
| RefSeq (protein) | NP_525021; NP_001364250 | n/a |
| Location (UCSC) | Chr 17: 69.15 – 69.24 Mb | n/a |
| PubMed search | | n/a |
- Wikidata
| View/Edit Human |

ATP binding cassette subfamily A member 10 is a protein that in humans is encoded by the ABCA10 gene.

== Function ==
The membrane-associated protein encoded by this gene is a member of the superfamily of ATP-binding cassette (ABC) transporters. ABC proteins transport various molecules across extra- and intracellular membranes. This encoded protein is a member of the ABCA subfamily. Members of the ABCA subfamily comprise the only major ABC subfamily found exclusively in multicellular eukaryotes. This gene is clustered among 4 other ABCA subfamily members on 17q24, but neither the substrate nor the function of this gene is known. [provided by RefSeq, Jul 2008].
