= ABCA13 =

Protein-coding gene in the species Homo sapiens

Identifiers
- Aliases: ABCA13, ATP-binding cassette, sub-family A (ABC1), member 13, ATP binding cassette subfamily A member 13
- External IDs: OMIM: 607807; MGI: 2388707; GeneCards: ABCA13

Gene location (Human)
| Chr. | Chromosome 7 (human) |
| Band | 7p12.3 | Start | 48,171,458 bp |
| Band | 7p12.3 | End | 48,647,497 bp |

Gene location (Mouse)
| Chr. | Chromosome 11 (mouse) |
| Band | 11|11 A1 | Start | 9,141,942 bp |
| Band | 11|11 A1 | End | 9,634,259 bp |
RNA expression pattern
| Bgee | Human / Mouse (ortholog); Top expressed in: bronchial epithelial cell; epithelium of nasopharynx; olfactory zone of nasal mucosa; mucosa of paranasal sinus; nasal epithelium; bone marrow cell; testicle; trabecular bone; trachea; gonad / Top expressed in: olfactory epithelium; otolith organ; utricle; human kidney; granulocyte; epithelium of small intestine; zygote; secondary oocyte; epithelium of lens; primary oocyte; More reference expression data |
| BioGPS | n/a |
Gene ontology
| Molecular function | nucleotide binding; ATPase activity; ATP binding; ATPase-coupled transmembrane transporter activity; lipid transporter activity |
| Cellular component | integral component of membrane; intracellular membrane-bounded organelle; membrane; plasma membrane; secretory granule membrane; azurophil granule membrane |
| Biological process | transmembrane transport; neutrophil degranulation; lipid transport |
Sources:Amigo / QuickGO
Orthologs
| Databases | NCBI: entry; OMA: entry |
| Species | Human | Mouse |
| Entrez | 154664 | 268379 |
| Ensembl | ENSG00000179869 | ENSMUSG00000004668 |
| UniProt | Q86UQ4 | Q5SSE9 |
| RefSeq (mRNA) | NM_152701; NM_152555 | NM_178259 |
| RefSeq (protein) | NP_689914 | NP_839990 |
| Location (UCSC) | Chr 7: 48.17 – 48.65 Mb | Chr 11: 9.14 – 9.63 Mb |
| PubMed search |
- Wikidata
| View/Edit Human | View/Edit Mouse |

ATP-binding cassette sub-family A member 13 also known as ABCA13 is a protein that in humans is encoded by the ABCA13 gene on chromosome 7. It belongs to the wide ATP-binding cassette family of proteins. The protein contains 5058 residues, and is currently the largest known protein of the ABC family.

== Clinical significance ==
One study suggests that rare variations and mutations of the gene may be linked to psychiatric disorders such as schizophrenia, bipolar disorder, and depression.
