= ABCA7 =

Protein-coding gene in the species Homo sapiens

Identifiers
- Aliases: ABCA7, ABCA-SSN, ABCX, AD9, ATP binding cassette subfamily A member 7
- External IDs: OMIM: 605414; MGI: 1351646; GeneCards: ABCA7
Enzyme activity
EC #	BRENDA	ExPASy	KEGG	MetaCyc
7.6.2.1	↗	↗	↗	↗

Gene location (Human)
Chr.	Chromosome 19 (human)
Band	19p13.3	Start	1,040,101 bp
Band	19p13.3	End	1,065,572 bp

Gene location (Mouse)
Chr.	Chromosome 10 (mouse)
Band	10 C1|10 39.72 cM	Start	79,832,328 bp
Band	10 C1|10 39.72 cM	End	79,851,406 bp
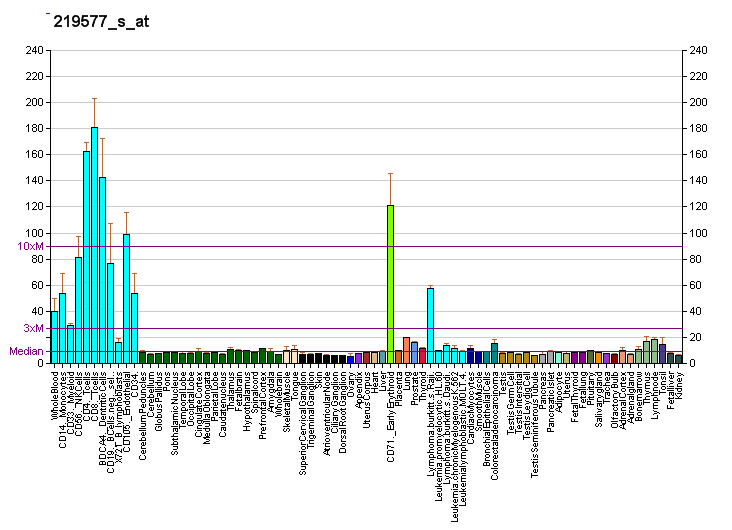
RNA expression pattern
Bgee	Human / Mouse (ortholog); Top expressed in: granulocyte; anterior pituitary; blood; spleen; right hemisphere of cerebellum; olfactory zone of nasal mucosa; mucosa of transverse colon; minor salivary glands; monocyte; lymph node / Top expressed in: granulocyte; lumbar spinal ganglion; tibiofemoral joint; interventricular septum; superior cervical ganglion; blood; fetal liver hematopoietic progenitor cell; islet of Langerhans; mesenteric lymph nodes; bone marrow; More reference expression data
BioGPS	More reference expression data
Gene ontology
Molecular function	nucleotide binding; ATPase activity; ATP binding; phosphatidylserine floppase activity; phosphatidylcholine floppase activity; apolipoprotein A-I receptor activity; transporter activity; ATPase-coupled transmembrane transporter activity; lipid transporter activity; protein binding
Cellular component	integral component of membrane; endosome; Golgi apparatus; early endosome membrane; intracellular membrane-bounded organelle; membrane; ATP-binding cassette (ABC) transporter complex; Golgi membrane; plasma membrane; cell junction; phagocytic cup; cell surface; ruffle membrane; glial cell projection; cytoplasm; endoplasmic reticulum; cell projection
Biological process	high-density lipoprotein particle assembly; cholesterol efflux; phagocytosis; phospholipid translocation; memory; positive regulation of cholesterol efflux; peptide cross-linking; phospholipid efflux; protein localization to nucleus; apolipoprotein A-I-mediated signaling pathway; negative regulation of amyloid precursor protein biosynthetic process; positive regulation of phagocytosis; positive regulation of ERK1 and ERK2 cascade; positive regulation of amyloid-beta clearance; positive regulation of engulfment of apoptotic cell; negative regulation of amyloid-beta formation; positive regulation of phospholipid efflux; transmembrane transport; lipid transport; amyloid-beta formation; negative regulation of endocytosis; amyloid-beta clearance by cellular catabolic process; regulation of amyloid precursor protein catabolic process; plasma membrane raft organization; positive regulation of protein localization to cell surface
Sources:Amigo / QuickGO
Orthologs
Databases	NCBI: entry; OMA: entry
Species	Human	Mouse
Entrez	10347	27403
Ensembl	ENSG00000064687	ENSMUSG00000035722
UniProt	Q8IZY2	Q91V24
RefSeq (mRNA)	NM_019112; NM_033308	NM_013850; NM_001347081
RefSeq (protein)	NP_061985	NP_001334010; NP_038878
Location (UCSC)	Chr 19: 1.04 – 1.07 Mb	Chr 10: 79.83 – 79.85 Mb
PubMed search
- Wikidata
View/Edit Human	View/Edit Mouse

ATP-binding cassette sub-family A member 7 is a protein that in humans is encoded by the ABCA7 gene.

== Function ==
The protein encoded by this gene is a member of the superfamily of ATP-binding cassette (ABC) transporters. ABC proteins transport various molecules across extra- and intra-cellular membranes. ABC genes are divided into seven distinct subfamilies: ABC1, MDR/TAP, CFTR/MRP, ALD (adrenoleukodystrophy), OABP, GCN20, and White. This protein is a member of the ABC1 subfamily. Members of the ABC1 subfamily comprise the only major ABC subfamily found exclusively in multicellular eukaryotes. This full transporter has been detected predominantly in myelo-lymphatic tissues with the highest expression in peripheral leukocytes, thymus, spleen, and bone marrow. The function of this protein is not yet known; however, the expression pattern suggests a role in lipid homeostasis in cells of the immune system. Alternative splicing of this gene results in two transcript variants.

Lack of ABCA7 gene exhibits phenotypes in mice, such as moderate decrease in plasma HDL and adipose tissues only in female, while release of cellular cholesterol and phospholipid is not impaired. Accordingly, decrease in plasma lectin level was also reported. Reduction of CD3 or CD1d may lead to dysfunction of T cells by deletion of ABCA7.

On the other hand, transfected and expressed ABCA7, but not endogenous ABCA7, mediates release of cell phospholipid and cholesterol to generate HDL-like particles but contain less cholesterol than those generated by ABCA1. ABCA7-generated HDL is smaller and appears as a single peak in a molecular sieve HPLC analysis in comparison to HDL generated by ABCA1 that shows twin peaks of small and poor in cholesterol and large and rich in cholesterol. ABCA7 mRNA generates full length cDNA and a spliced form of cDNA, and only the former is capable of generating HDL when transfected.

ABCA7 was shown associated with cellular phagocytotic activity. The promoter of ABCA7 contains sterol regulatory element (SRE) so that ABCA7 is down-regulated by cell cholesterol through sterol regulatory element binding protein (SREBP) 2. Therefore, ABCA7 expression and phagocytosis are up-regulated by use of HMG-reductase inhibitors (statins). In addition, ABCA7 is stabilized like ABCA1 by helical apolipoproteins such as apoA-I, and phagocytosis is accordingly increased in such a condition.

In summary, ABCA7 is a substantially related protein to ABCA1 but it does not mediate cell cholesterol release by generation of HDL unless it is externally transfected and expressed in vitro. ABCA7 is shown associated with cellular phagocytotic function in vivo and in vitro, and expression of the ABCA7 gene is regulated by cell cholesterol mainly through the SRE/SREBP system in a negative feed-back fashion in contrast to positive feedback by the LXR/RXR system for ABCA1. ABCA7 thus links cholesterol metabolism to host defense system.

== Clinical significance ==
In 2011, two genome-wide association studies (GWAS) identified ABCA7 as a new susceptibility locus for late-onset Alzheimer's disease. The finding was also confirmed by other meta-analysis investigations later. Such association of ABCA7 variants was reported on more specific findings of the disease such as memory decline and incident mild cognitive impairment or cortical and hippocampal atrophy.

Protein-disrupting variants in ABCA7 have been shown to predispose to Alzheimer's disease. The Icelandic database of Decode Genetics has shown a doubled probability of developing Alzheimer's disease when inactive variants of the ABCA7 gene are present.

By using the knock-out mice, ABCA7 was indicated involved in generation and processing of amyloid β (Aβ) peptides. In the brain of the amyloid precursor protein transgenic mice, deletion of ABCA7 resulted in accumulation of Aβ40 and Aβ42 in the early stage apparently by accelerating Aβ production. More rapid endocytosis of amyloid precursor protein was observed in primary microglia from ABCA7 deficient mice. Roles of ABCA7 are also implicated for microglial phagocytotic function and immune responses. Although the direct target of ABCA7 function is unclear, the findings are so far mechanistically consistent with the increased Aβ production.

The data can be summarized as 1) loss of function of ABCA7 is associated with a risk for late onset Alzheimer's disease, 2) one of its molecular backgrounds can be enhanced production/decreased processing of Aβ peptides, and 3) ABCA7 is at least shown to increase phagocytosis including that of microglia. Since ABCA7 gene is down-regulated by cell cholesterol via the SRE/SREBP system, the data accumulated are consistent with clinical implication that use of statins, HMG-CoA reductase inhibitors, reduces risk for Alzheimer's disease.

== See also ==
- ATP-binding cassette transporter
