= ABCF2 =

Protein-coding gene in the species Homo sapiens

Identifiers
- Aliases: ABCF2, ABC28, EST133090, HUSSY18, HUSSY-18, ATP binding cassette subfamily F member 2
- External IDs: OMIM: 612510; MGI: 1351657; GeneCards: ABCF2

Gene location (Human)
Chr.	Chromosome 7 (human)
Band	7q36.1	Start	151,211,484 bp
Band	7q36.1	End	151,227,205 bp

Gene location (Mouse)
Chr.	Chromosome 5 (mouse)
Band	5|5 A3	Start	24,770,343 bp
Band	5|5 A3	End	24,782,465 bp
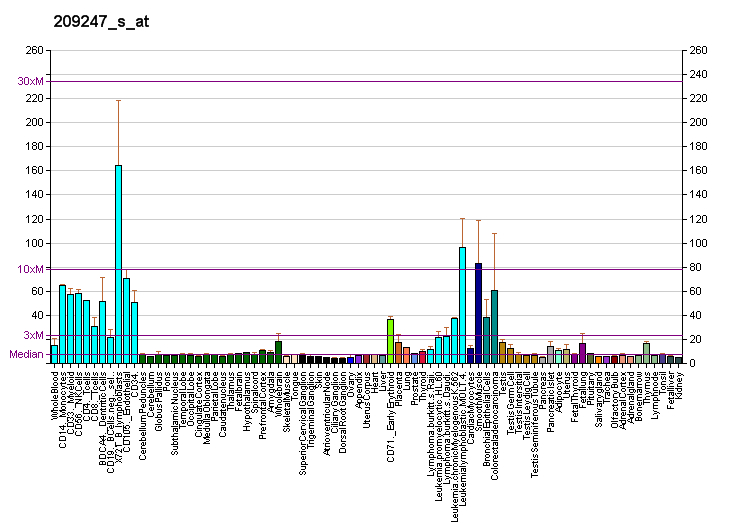

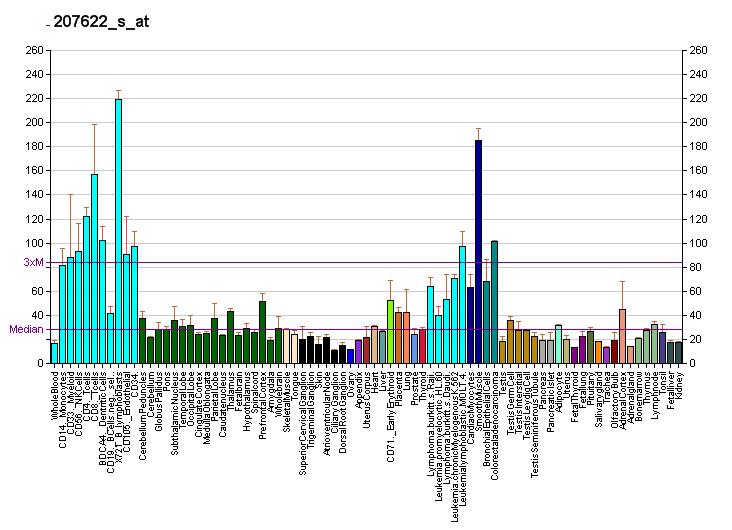

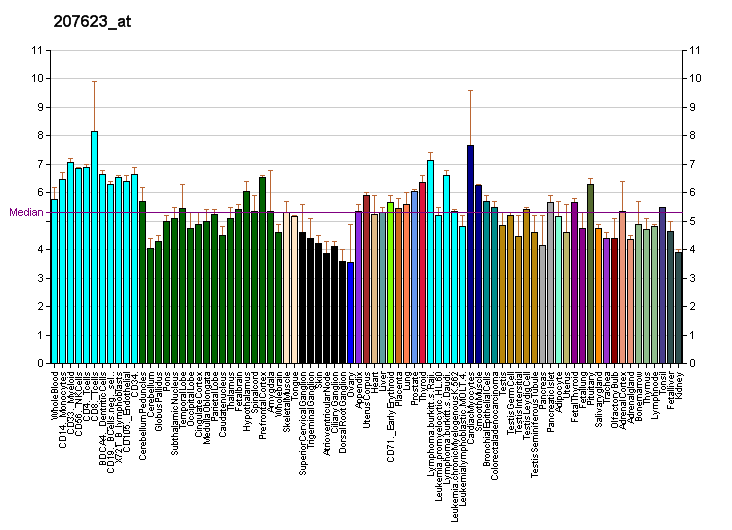
RNA expression pattern
Bgee	Human / Mouse (ortholog); Top expressed in: sural nerve; gastrocnemius muscle; tibialis anterior muscle; endothelial cell; right frontal lobe; secondary oocyte; apex of heart; prefrontal cortex; muscle of thigh; Brodmann area 9 / Top expressed in: muscle of thigh; spermatid; spermatocyte; morula; epiblast; ventricular zone; seminiferous tubule; zygote; embryo; somite; More reference expression data
BioGPS	More reference expression data
Gene ontology
Molecular function	nucleotide binding; ATPase activity; ATP binding; transporter activity
Cellular component	ATP-binding cassette (ABC) transporter complex; mitochondrial envelope; membrane; mitochondrion
Biological process	transport
Sources:Amigo / QuickGO
Orthologs
Databases	NCBI: entry; OMA: entry
Species	Human	Mouse
Entrez	10061	27407
Ensembl	ENSG00000033050	ENSMUSG00000028953
UniProt	Q9UG63	Q99LE6
RefSeq (mRNA)	NM_007189	NM_001190443; NM_013853; NM_001359205
RefSeq (protein)	NP_005683; NP_009120	NP_001177372; NP_038881; NP_001346134
Location (UCSC)	Chr 7: 151.21 – 151.23 Mb	Chr 5: 24.77 – 24.78 Mb
PubMed search
- Wikidata
View/Edit Human	View/Edit Mouse

ATP-binding cassette sub-family F member 2 is a protein that in humans is encoded by the ABCF2 gene.

== Function ==
The protein encoded by this gene is a member of the superfamily of ATP-binding cassette (ABC) transporters. ABC proteins transport various molecules across extra- and intracellular membranes. ABC genes are divided into seven distinct subfamilies (ABC1, MDR/TAP, MRP, ALD, OABP, GCN20, and White). This protein is a member of the GCN20 subfamily. Alternative splicing of this gene results in multiple transcript variants.

ABCF2 acts as a suppressor of the volume-sensitive outwardly rectifying Cl channel (CLCN3).

== See also ==
- ATP-binding cassette transporter
