= ABCA9 =

Protein-coding gene in the species Homo sapiens

Identifiers
- Aliases: ABCA9, EST640918, ATP binding cassette subfamily A member 9
- External IDs: OMIM: 612507; MGI: 2386796; GeneCards: ABCA9

Gene location (Human)
| Chr. | Chromosome 17 (human) |
| Band | 17q24.2 | Start | 68,974,488 bp |
| Band | 17q24.2 | End | 69,060,949 bp |

Gene location (Mouse)
| Chr. | Chromosome 11 (mouse) |
| Band | 11|11 E1 | Start | 109,991,575 bp |
| Band | 11|11 E1 | End | 110,059,022 bp |
RNA expression pattern
| Bgee | Human / Mouse (ortholog); Top expressed in: gastric mucosa; tibial nerve; sural nerve; left ovary; myocardium of left ventricle; subcutaneous adipose tissue; right ovary; cardiac muscle tissue of right atrium; pericardium; apex of heart / Top expressed in: sciatic nerve; ciliary body; vestibular sensory epithelium; stroma of bone marrow; otolith organ; iris; utricle; dermis; umbilical cord; conjunctival fornix; More reference expression data |
| BioGPS | n/a |
Gene ontology
| Molecular function | nucleotide binding; ATPase activity; ATP binding; ATPase-coupled transmembrane transporter activity; lipid transporter activity |
| Cellular component | integral component of membrane; membrane; intracellular membrane-bounded organelle |
| Biological process | lipid transport; transmembrane transport |
Sources:Amigo / QuickGO
Orthologs
| Databases | NCBI: entry; OMA: entry |
| Species | Human | Mouse |
| Entrez | 10350 | 217262 |
| Ensembl | ENSG00000154258 | ENSMUSG00000041797 |
| UniProt | Q8IUA7 | Q8K449 |
| RefSeq (mRNA) | NM_080283; NM_172386 | NM_147220 |
| RefSeq (protein) | NP_525022 | NP_671753 |
| Location (UCSC) | Chr 17: 68.97 – 69.06 Mb | Chr 11: 109.99 – 110.06 Mb |
| PubMed search |
- Wikidata
| View/Edit Human | View/Edit Mouse |

ATP-binding cassette sub-family A member 9 is a protein that in humans is encoded by the ABCA9 gene.

== Function ==
This gene is a member of the superfamily of ATP-binding cassette (ABC) transporters and the encoded protein contains two transmembrane domains and two nucleotide binding folds. ABC proteins transport various molecules across extra- and intracellular membranes. This gene is a member of the ABCA subfamily and is clustered with four other ABCA subfamily members on chromosome 17q24. Transcriptional expression of this gene is induced during monocyte differentiation into macrophages and is suppressed by cholesterol import.
