= ABCA8 =

Protein-coding gene in the species Homo sapiens

Identifiers
- Aliases: ABCA8, ATP binding cassette subfamily A member 8
- External IDs: OMIM: 612505; MGI: 1351668; GeneCards: ABCA8

Gene location (Human)
Chr.	Chromosome 17 (human)
Band	17q24.2	Start	68,867,289 bp
Band	17q24.2	End	68,955,392 bp

Gene location (Mouse)
Chr.	Chromosome 11 (mouse)
Band	11 E1|11 72.88 cM	Start	109,823,016 bp
Band	11 E1|11 72.88 cM	End	109,886,671 bp
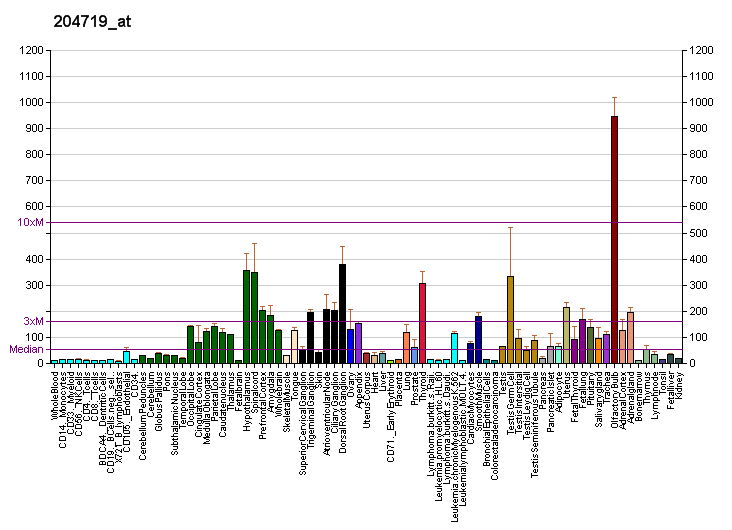
RNA expression pattern
Bgee	Human / Mouse (ortholog); Top expressed in: spinal ganglia; trigeminal ganglion; parietal pleura; pericardium; tibial nerve; cardiac muscle tissue of right atrium; germinal epithelium; corpus callosum; sural nerve; vena cava / Top expressed in: lumbar spinal ganglion; muscle of thigh; liver; neural layer of retina; left lobe of liver; dentate gyrus of hippocampal formation granule cell; esophagus; extraocular muscle; upper arm; triceps brachii muscle; More reference expression data
BioGPS	More reference expression data
Gene ontology
Molecular function	nucleotide binding; ATPase activity; ATP binding; ABC-type xenobiotic transporter activity; ATPase-coupled transmembrane transporter activity; lipid transporter activity
Cellular component	integral component of membrane; plasma membrane; membrane; mitochondrial inner membrane; intracellular membrane-bounded organelle
Biological process	lipid transport; xenobiotic transport; xenobiotic transmembrane transport; transmembrane transport
Sources:Amigo / QuickGO
Orthologs
Databases	NCBI: entry; OMA: entry
Species	Human	Mouse
Entrez	10351	27404
Ensembl	ENSG00000141338	ENSMUSG00000020620
UniProt	O94911	Q8K440
RefSeq (mRNA)	NM_001288985; NM_001288986; NM_007168; NM_001375771; NM_001375772	NM_013851; NM_001362749
RefSeq (protein)	NP_001275914; NP_001275915; NP_009099; NP_001362700; NP_001362701	NP_038879; NP_001349678
Location (UCSC)	Chr 17: 68.87 – 68.96 Mb	Chr 11: 109.82 – 109.89 Mb
PubMed search
- Wikidata
View/Edit Human	View/Edit Mouse

ABC-type organic anion transporter ABCA8 is a protein that in humans is encoded by the ABCA8 gene.

The membrane-associated protein encoded by this gene is a member of the superfamily of ATP-binding cassette (ABC) transporters. ABC proteins transport various molecules across extra- and intracellular membranes. This protein is a member of the ABCA subfamily. Members of the ABCA subfamily comprise the only major ABC subfamily found exclusively in multicellular eukaryotes.
