= ABCF1 =

Protein-coding gene in the species Homo sapiens

Identifiers
- Aliases: ABCF1, ABC27, ABC50, ATP binding cassette subfamily F member 1
- External IDs: OMIM: 603429; MGI: 1351658; GeneCards: ABCF1

Gene location (Human)
Chr.	Chromosome 6 (human)
Band	6p21.33	Start	30,571,393 bp
Band	6p21.33	End	30,597,179 bp

Gene location (Mouse)
Chr.	Chromosome 17 (mouse)
Band	17 B1|17 18.8 cM	Start	36,267,711 bp
Band	17 B1|17 18.8 cM	End	36,280,653 bp
RNA expression pattern
Bgee	Human / Mouse (ortholog); Top expressed in: sural nerve; gastrocnemius muscle; skeletal muscle tissue; islet of Langerhans; muscle of thigh; placenta; ventricular zone; mucosa of transverse colon; stromal cell of endometrium; granulocyte / Top expressed in: neural layer of retina; tail of embryo; Rostral migratory stream; genital tubercle; yolk sac; condyle; primitive streak; lacrimal gland; fetal liver hematopoietic progenitor cell; fossa; More reference expression data
BioGPS	n/a
Gene ontology
Molecular function	nucleotide binding; ribosome binding; translation activator activity; translation factor activity, RNA binding; ATPase activity; protein binding; ATP binding; RNA binding
Cellular component	cytoplasm; ribosome; nuclear envelope; membrane; nucleoplasm; nucleus; polysomal ribosome; cytosol
Biological process	protein biosynthesis; ribosome biogenesis; positive regulation of translation; transmembrane transport; translational initiation; inflammatory response
Sources:Amigo / QuickGO
Orthologs
Databases	NCBI: entry; OMA: entry
Species	Human	Mouse
Entrez	23	224742
Ensembl	ENSG00000206490; ENSG00000225989; ENSG00000236149; ENSG00000232169; ENSG00000204574 ENSG00000236342; ENSG00000231129	ENSMUSG00000038762
UniProt	Q8NE71	Q6P542
RefSeq (mRNA)	NM_001090; NM_001025091	NM_013854
RefSeq (protein)	NP_001020262; NP_001081	NP_038882
Location (UCSC)	Chr 6: 30.57 – 30.6 Mb	Chr 17: 36.27 – 36.28 Mb
PubMed search
- Wikidata
View/Edit Human	View/Edit Mouse

ATP-binding cassette sub-family F member 1 is a protein that in humans is encoded by the ABCF1 gene.

The protein encoded by this gene is a member of the superfamily of ATP-binding cassette (ABC) transporters. ABC proteins transport various molecules across extra- and intra-cellular membranes. ABC genes are divided into seven distinct subfamilies (ABC1, MDR/TAP, MRP, ALD, OABP, GCN20, White). This protein is a member of the GCN20 subfamily. Unlike other members of the superfamily, this protein lacks the transmembrane domains, characteristic of most ABC transporters. This protein may be regulated by tumor necrosis factor-alpha and play a role in enhancing protein synthesis and inflammation.

== See also ==
- ATP-binding cassette transporter
