= ABCB5 =

Protein-coding gene in humans

Identifiers
- Aliases: ABCB5, ABCB5alpha, ABCB5beta, EST422562, ATP binding cassette subfamily B member 5
- External IDs: OMIM: 611785; MGI: 1924956; GeneCards: ABCB5
Enzyme activity
EC #	BRENDA	ExPASy	KEGG	MetaCyc
7.6.2.2	↗	↗	↗	↗

Gene location (Human)
Chr.	Chromosome 7 (human)
Band	7p21.1	Start	20,615,667 bp
Band	7p21.1	End	20,777,038 bp

Gene location (Mouse)
Chr.	Chromosome 12 (mouse)
Band	12|12 F2	Start	118,831,559 bp
Band	12|12 F2	End	118,930,156 bp
RNA expression pattern
Bgee	Human / Mouse (ortholog); Top expressed in: tail of epididymis; corpus epididymis; gallbladder; gonad; skin of hip; tibia; caput epididymis; subcutaneous adipose tissue; gastric mucosa; retinal pigment epithelium / Top expressed in: morula; zygote; secondary oocyte; primary oocyte; embryo; uterus; ovary; blastocyst; proximal tubule; testicle; More reference expression data
BioGPS	n/a
Gene ontology
Molecular function	efflux transmembrane transporter activity; nucleotide binding; ATPase activity; ATP binding; ABC-type xenobiotic transporter activity; ATPase-coupled transmembrane transporter activity
Cellular component	integral component of membrane; plasma membrane; integral component of plasma membrane; membrane
Biological process	regulation of membrane potential; cell differentiation; compound eye corneal lens development; transmembrane transport; xenobiotic transport; xenobiotic transmembrane transport
Sources:Amigo / QuickGO
Orthologs
Databases	NCBI: entry; OMA: entry
Species	Human	Mouse
Entrez	340273	77706
Ensembl	ENSG00000004846	ENSMUSG00000072791
UniProt	Q2M3G0	B5X0E4
RefSeq (mRNA)	NM_001163941; NM_001163942; NM_001163993; NM_178559	NM_029961
RefSeq (protein)	NP_001157413; NP_001157414; NP_001157465; NP_848654	NP_084237
Location (UCSC)	Chr 7: 20.62 – 20.78 Mb	Chr 12: 118.83 – 118.93 Mb
PubMed search
- Wikidata
View/Edit Human	View/Edit Mouse

ATP-binding cassette sub-family B member 5 also known as P-glycoprotein ABCB5 is a plasma membrane-spanning protein that in humans is encoded by the ABCB5 gene. ABCB5 is an ABC transporter and P-glycoprotein family member principally expressed in physiological skin and human melanoma.

== Clinical significance ==
ABCB5 has been suggested to regulate skin progenitor cell fusion and mediate chemotherapeutic drug resistance in stem-like tumor cell subpopulations in human melanoma, colorectal cancer, and malignant pleural mesothelioma. It is commonly over-expressed on circulating melanoma tumour cells. Furthermore, the ABCB5+ melanoma- initiating cells were demonstrated to express FLT1 (VEGFR1) receptor tyrosine kinase which was functionally required for efficient xenograft tumor formation, as demonstrated by shRNA knockdown experiments.

In colorectal cancer, ABCB5 was shown to act as a mediator of 5-FU patient chemoresistance, and had a further direct role in tumorigenesis shown by shRNA-mediated colorectal cancer cell-line ABCB5 knockdowns that impeded tumorigenesis in human-to-mouse xenografts. It has been shown that in some highly aggressive tumors, such as mesothelioma and melanoma, ABCB5 contributes to multi-drug chemotherapy resistance, and tumor growth, controlling a proinflammatory signaling circuit utilizing TLR4, IL-1β, IL8 and CXCR1 signaling involving reciprocal paracrine interactions between the cancer stem cells and tumor bulk population (in a rheostat manner termed "cancer stem cell rheostasis"). ABCB5 was shown to maintain the slow-cycling melanoma stem cells using this cytokine signaling loop, which became more differentiated upon ABCB5 interference (e.g. WFDC1 melanocyte differentiation marker increased, cancer cells were faster growing in vitro, tumors were more pigmented), or CXCR1 blockade (slow-cycling ABCB5+ cells entered the cell-cycle).

In normal physiology, ABCB5 is a functional marker for adult limbal stem cells of the cornea. ABCB5+ cells could regrow a human cornea on a mouse with limbal stem cell deficiency (LSCD - a blindness disease of the corneal limbus) while ABCB5- cells could not, indicating a therapeutic potential for treating some types of blindness. ABCB5 was further shown to be anti-apoptotic in these adult stem cells.
