= ABCA2 =

Protein-coding gene in the species Homo sapiens

Identifiers
- Aliases: ABCA2, ATP-binding cassette, sub-family A (ABC1), member 2, AI413825, Abc2, D2H0S1474E, mKIAA1062, ATP binding cassette subfamily A member 2, IDPOGSA
- External IDs: OMIM: 600047; MGI: 99606; GeneCards: ABCA2

Gene location (Human)
Chr.	Chromosome 9 (human)
Band	9q34.3	Start	137,007,234 bp
Band	9q34.3	End	137,028,915 bp

Gene location (Mouse)
Chr.	Chromosome 2 (mouse)
Band	2 A3|2 17.25 cM	Start	25,318,715 bp
Band	2 A3|2 17.25 cM	End	25,338,552 bp
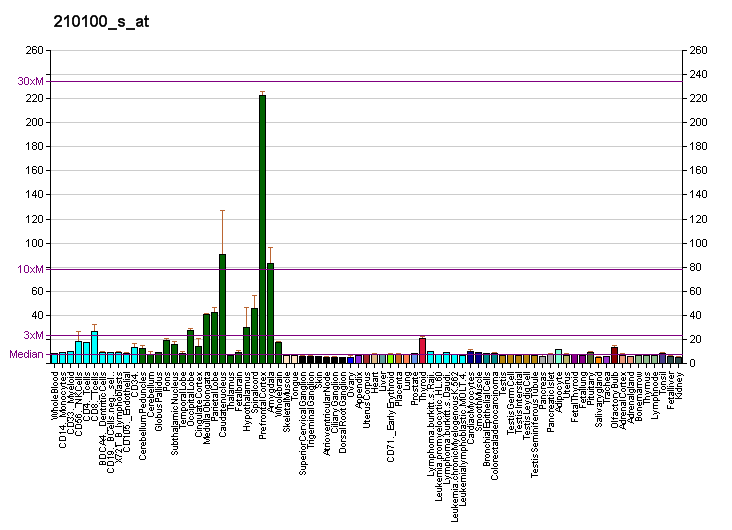

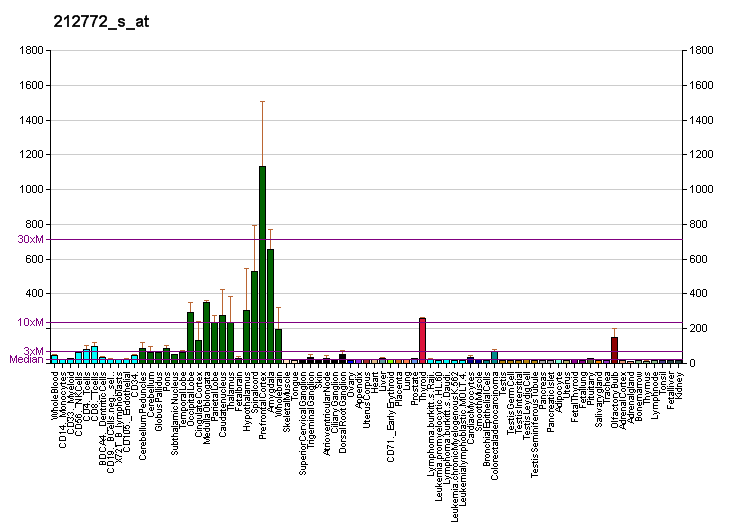
RNA expression pattern
Bgee	Human / Mouse (ortholog); Top expressed in: C1 segment; right hemisphere of cerebellum; right frontal lobe; tibial nerve; middle frontal gyrus; amygdala; inferior ganglion of vagus nerve; prefrontal cortex; hypothalamus; sural nerve / Top expressed in: superior frontal gyrus; primary visual cortex; dentate gyrus of hippocampal formation granule cell; cerebellar cortex; choroid plexus of fourth ventricle; perirhinal cortex; central gray substance of midbrain; entorhinal cortex; CA3 field; lumbar subsegment of spinal cord; More reference expression data
BioGPS	More reference expression data
Gene ontology
Molecular function	ATPase-coupled transmembrane transporter activity; nucleotide binding; transporter activity; ATPase activity; ATP binding; lipid transporter activity
Cellular component	integral component of membrane; endosome; membrane; ATP-binding cassette (ABC) transporter complex; microtubule organizing center; lysosomal membrane; lysosome; endosome membrane; cytoplasmic vesicle; intracellular membrane-bounded organelle
Biological process	regulation of intracellular cholesterol transport; lipid metabolism; regulation of transcription by RNA polymerase II; response to steroid hormone; cholesterol homeostasis; transmembrane transport; transport; lipid transport; response to cholesterol
Sources:Amigo / QuickGO
Orthologs
Databases	NCBI: entry; OMA: entry
Species	Human	Mouse
Entrez	20	11305
Ensembl	ENSG00000107331	ENSMUSG00000026944
UniProt	Q9BZC7	P41234
RefSeq (mRNA)	NM_001606; NM_212533	NM_007379; NM_001368624
RefSeq (protein)	NP_001597; NP_997698	NP_031405; NP_001355553
Location (UCSC)	Chr 9: 137.01 – 137.03 Mb	Chr 2: 25.32 – 25.34 Mb
PubMed search
- Wikidata
View/Edit Human	View/Edit Mouse

ATP-binding cassette sub-family A member 2 is a protein that in humans is encoded by the ABCA2 gene.

The membrane-associated protein encoded by this gene is a member of the superfamily of ATP-binding cassette (ABC) transporters. ABC proteins transport various molecules across extra- and intracellular membranes. ABC genes are divided into seven distinct subfamilies (ABC1, MDR/TAP, MRP, ALD, OABP, GCN20, White). This protein is a member of the ABC1 subfamily. Members of the ABC1 subfamily comprise the only major ABC subfamily found exclusively in multicellular eukaryotes. This protein is highly expressed in brain tissue and may play a role in macrophage lipid metabolism and neural development. Two transcript variants encoding different isoforms have been found for this gene.

== See also ==
- ATP-binding cassette transporter
