= History of dyslexia research =

The history of dyslexia research spans from the late 19th century to the present.

== Pre-1900 ==
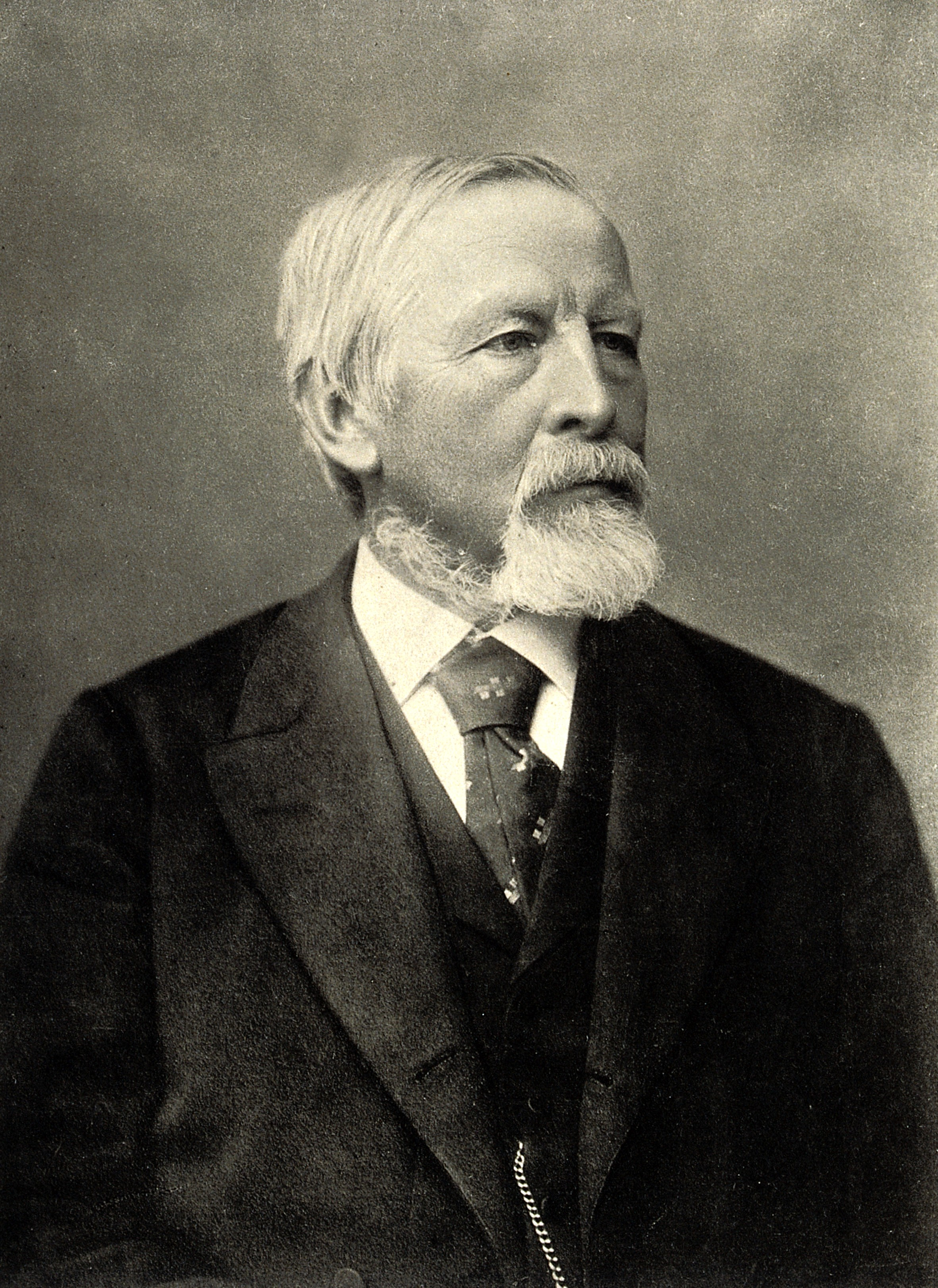
Adolph Kussmaul

The concept of "word-blindness" (German: "wortblindheit"), as an isolated condition, was first developed by the German physician Adolph Kussmaul in 1877. Identified by Oswald Berkhan in 1881, the term 'dyslexia' was later coined in 1887 by Rudolf Berlin, an ophthalmologist practicing in Stuttgart, Germany. Rudolf Berlin used the term dyslexia to describe partial reading loss in an adult patient. The word is drawn from the Greek prefix δυσ- (dus-), "hard, bad, difficult" + λέξις (lexis), "speech, word". He used the term to refer to a case of a young boy who had a severe impairment in learning to read and write in spite of showing typical intellectual and physical abilities in all other respects.

In 1896, W. Pringle Morgan, a British physician, from Seaford, East Sussex published a description of a reading-specific learning disorder in a report to the British Medical Journal titled "Congenital Word Blindness". This described the case of a 14-year-old boy who had not yet learned to read, yet showed normal intelligence and was generally adept at other activities typical of children of that age. The boy could read and write all letters in the alphabet; however, had difficult in reading common monosyllabic words. The boy's spelling was extremely poor. He substituted word suffixes ("winder" for "winding") and transposed his letters within the words ("Precy" for Percy). The boy showed no difficulty in reading multidigit numbers and correctly solving problems such as (a + x)(a - x) = (a^{2} - x^{2}). This led Morgan to conclude the etiology of reading disability to be congenital and attributed it to defective development of the left angular gyrus of the brain.

== 1900-1950 ==
During the 1890s and early 1900s, James Hinshelwood, a British ophthalmologist, published a series of articles in medical journals describing similar cases of congenital word blindness, which he defined as "a congenital defect occurring in children with otherwise normal and undamaged brains characterised by a difficulty in learning to read." In his 1917 book Congenital Word Blindness, Hinshelwood asserted that the primary disability was in visual memory for words and letters, and described symptoms including letter reversals, and difficulties with spelling and reading comprehension. Additionally, another British physician, CJ Thomas, provided a summary of congenital word blindness based on 100 cases at special schools in England. Thomas observed that word blindness was more prevalent than suspected. Furthermore, it appeared more than one member of the family was affected and three times more frequent in males than females. Thomas recommended that children with this disability be taught on a one-to-one bases and initially teach the alphabet be accomplished through touch by encouraging the child to handle large wooden letters.

In 1925 Samuel T. Orton, a neuropsychiatrist from Iowa, who worked primarily with stroke victims, met a girl who could not read and who exhibited symptoms similar to stroke victims who had lost the ability to read. Orton began studying reading difficulties and determined that there was a syndrome unrelated to brain damage that made learning to read difficult. In 1930, Orton called his theory strephosymbolia (meaning 'twisted signs') and specific reading disability to describe individuals with dyslexia had difficulty associating the visual forms of words with their spoken forms. Ironicially, others who criticized strephosymbolia because mirror writing and reversals in reading are not salient symptoms of specific reading disability. Orton used the term specific reading disability more often than strephosymbolia. Orton observed that reading deficits in dyslexia did not seem to stem from strictly visual deficits. He believed the condition was caused by the failure to establish hemispheric dominance in the brain. He also observed that the children he worked with were disproportionately left- or mixed-handed, although this finding has been difficult to replicate. Influenced by the kinesthetic work of Helen Keller and Grace Fernald, and looking for a way to teach reading using both left and right brain functions, Orton later worked with psychologist and educator Anna Gillingham to develop an educational intervention that pioneered the use of simultaneous multisensory instruction. Orton's 1937 book hinged around the treatment of specific reading disabilities.

In contrast, Dearborn, Gates, Bennet and Blau considered a faulty guidance of the seeing mechanism to be the cause. They sought to discover if a conflict between spontaneous orientation of the scanning action of the eyes from right to left and training aimed at the acquisition of an opposite direction would allow an interpretation of the facts observed in the dyslexic disorder and especially of the ability to mirror-read.

To this end the authors asked four adults to read a text reflected in a mirror for ten minutes a day for five months. In all subjects, the words were not perceived in their globality but required a meticulous analysis of the letters and syllables. They also demonstrated total or partial inversions even sometimes affecting the order of the words in a sentence. They revealed a curious impression of not just horizontal but also vertical inversions. These are errors that exist amongst people with dyslexia and they experience the aggravating circumstance inherent in all learning.

== 1950–2000 ==
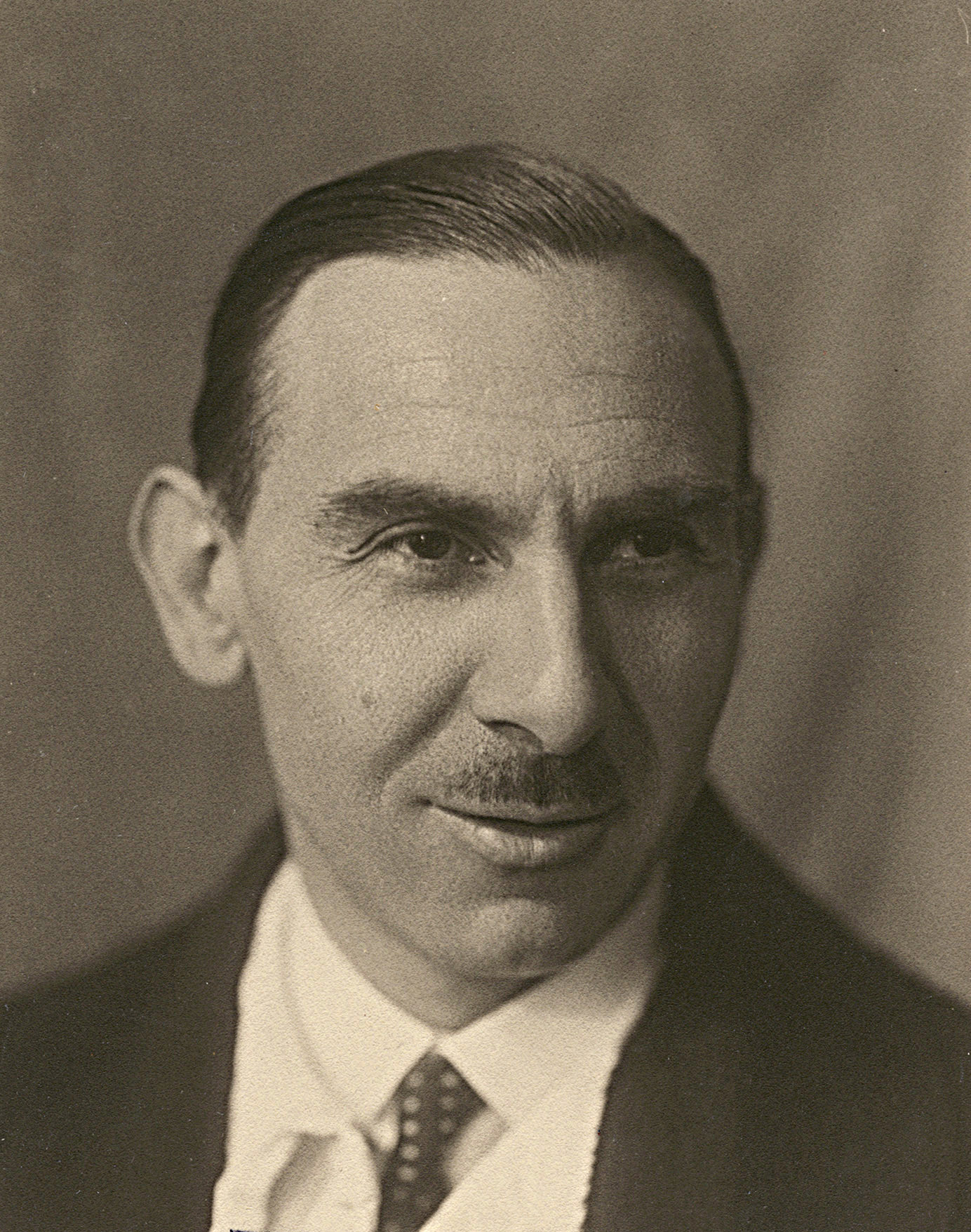
Clément Launay

In 1949, research conducted under Clement Launay (thesis G. Mahec Paris 1951) went further. In adult subjects, the reading of a series of 66 tiny lower-case letters, 5 mm high, spaced 5 mm apart, first from left to right, and then from right to left, was more easily and quickly done in the left to right direction. For former dyslexic children, a substantial number read a series of 42 letters with equal speed in both directions, and some (10%) read better from right to left than from left to right. The phenomenon is clearly linked to the dynamics of sight, as it disappears when the space between letters is increased, transforming the reading into spelling. This experience also explains the ability to mirror-read.

In April 1963, the conference Explorations into the Problems of the Perceptually Handicapped Child, Samuel Kirk introduced the term learning disability to provide a more collective term for reading disability and other related difficulties.

In 1964, the Associated for Children with Learning Disabilities (now known as Learning Disability Association of America) was formed.

In 1968, Makita suggested that dyslexia was mostly absent among Japanese children. A 2005 study shows that Makita's claim of rarity of incidence of reading disabilities in Japan to be incorrect.

In the 1970s, a hypothesis emerged that dyslexia stems from a deficit in phonological processing, or difficulty in recognizing that spoken words are formed by discrete phonemes, for example, that the word CAT comes from the sounds [k], [æ], and [t]. As a result, affected individuals have difficulty associating these sounds with the visual letters that make up written words. Key studies of the phonological deficit hypothesis include the finding that the strongest predictor of reading success in school age children is phonological awareness, and that phonological awareness instruction can improve decoding skills for children with reading difficulties.

In 1975, the passage of the Education for All Handicapped Children Act of 1975 (PL 94–142) defined learning disability as a "disorder in one or more of the basic psychological processes involved in understanding or in using spoken or written language, which may manifest itself in an imperfect ability to listen, think, speak, write, spell or to do mathematical calculations."

In 1979, Galaburda and Kemper and Galaburda et al. 1985, reported observations from the examination of post autopsy brains of people with dyslexia. Observed anatomical differences in the language center in a dyslexic brain, showing microscopic cortical malformations known as ectopias and more rarely vascular micro-malformations and in some instances these cortical malformations appeared as a microgyrus. These studies and those of Cohen et al. 1989, suggested abnormal cortical development which was presumed to occur before or during the sixth month of foetal brain development.

In 1993, Castles and Coltheart described developmental dyslexia as two prevalent and distinct varieties using the subtypes of alexia (acquired dyslexia), surface and phonological dyslexia. Understanding these subtypes is useful in diagnosing learning patterns and developing approaches for overcoming visual perception impairments or speech discrimination deficits. Cestnick and Coltheart (1999) demonstrated what these underlying deficits are in part, through unveiling different profiles of phonological versus surface dyslexics. Surface dyslexia is characterized by subjects who can read known words but who have trouble reading words that are irregular. Phonological dyslexia is characterized by subjects who can read aloud both regular and irregular words but have difficulties with non-words and with connecting sounds to symbols, or with sounding out words. Phonological processing tasks predict reading accuracy and comprehension. Cestnick and Jerger (2000) and Cestnick (2001) further demonstrated distinct processing differences between phonological and surface dyslexics. Manis et al. 1996, concluded that there were probably more than two subtypes of dyslexia, which would be related to multiple underlying deficits.

In 1994, from post autopsy specimens Galaburda et al., reported : Abnormal auditory processing in people with dyslexia suggests that accompanying anatomical abnormalities might be present in the auditory system. They measured cross-sectional neuronal areas in the medial geniculate nuclei (MGNs) of five dyslexic and seven control brains. In contrast to controls, which showed no asymmetry, the left-side medial geniculate nucleus (MGN) neurons were significantly smaller than the right in the dyslexic sample. Also, as compared with controls, there were more small neurons and fewer large neurons in the left dyslexic MGN. These findings are consistent with reported behavioral findings of a left hemisphere-based phonological defect in dyslexic individuals.

The development of neuroimaging technologies during the 1980s and 1990s enabled dyslexia research to make significant advances. Positron emission tomography (PET) and functional magnetic resonance imaging (fMRI) studies have revealed the neural signature of adult normal reading (e.g., Bookheimer et al., 1995; Fiez and Petersen, 1998; Price, 1997; Pugh et al., 1996; Turkeltaub et al., 2002) and phonological processing (e.g., Gelfand and Bookheimer, 2003; Poldrack et al., 1999; Price et al., 1997; Rumsey et al., 1997a). Brain imaging studies have also characterized the anomalous patterns of neuronal activation associated with reading and phonological processing in adults with persistent or compensated developmental dyslexia (e.g., Brunswick et al., 1999; Demonet et al., 1992; Flowers et al., 1991; Horwitz et al., 1998; Ingvar et al., 1993; Paulesu et al., 1996; Pugh et al., 2000; Rumsey et al., 1997b; Shaywitz et al., 1998). Employing various experimental approaches and paradigms (e.g., the detection or judgment of rhymes, nonword reading, and implicit reading), these studies have localized dysfunctional phonological processing in dyslexia to left-hemisphere perisylvian regions. Differences in task-related signal change in the left temporoparietal and occipitotemporal cortices have emerged as the most consistent findings in studies of dyslexia in the alphabetic writing system (Paulesu et al., 2001; for review, see Eden and Zeffiro, 1998). However, it has been demonstrated that in nonalphabetic scripts, where reading places less demands on phonemic processing and the integration of visual-orthographic information is crucial, dyslexia is associated with under activity of the left middle frontal gyrus (Siok et al., 2004).

In 1999, Wydell and Butterworth reported the case study of an English-Japanese bilingual with monolingual dyslexia. Suggesting that any language where orthography-to-phonology mapping is transparent, or even opaque, or any language whose orthographic unit representing sound is coarse (i.e. at a whole character or word level) should not produce a high incidence of developmental phonological dyslexia, and that orthography can influence dyslexic symptoms.

== 2000s ==
In 2001, Temple et al. Suggest that dyslexia may be characterized in childhood by disruptions in the neural bases of both phonological and orthographic processes important for reading.

In 2002, Talcott et al. reported that both visual motion sensitivity and auditory sensitivity to frequency differences were robust predictors of children's literacy skills and their orthographic and phonological skills.

In 2003, Turkeltaub et al., reported: "The complexities of pediatric brain imaging have precluded studies that trace the neural development of cognitive skills acquired during childhood. Using a task that isolates reading-related brain activity and minimizes confounding performance effects, we carried out a cross-sectional functional magnetic resonance imaging (fMRI) study using subjects whose ages ranged from 6 to 22 years. We found that learning to read is associated with two patterns of change in brain activity: increased activity in left-hemisphere middle temporal and Inferior frontal gyrus and decreased activity in right inferotemporal cortica areas. Activity in the left-posterior superior temporal sulcus of the youngest readers was associated with the maturation of their phonological processing abilities. These findings inform current reading models and provide strong support for Orton's 1925 theory of reading development."

(A guide to the areas of the brain List of regions in the human brain, Cerebral hemisphere. and Cerebral cortex )

In 2003, Ziegler and colleagues argued that the dyslexia experienced by Germans and Italians was very similar to the dyslexia experienced by English speakers. This similarity of readers of different—shallow versus deep orthographic systems, supported the idea that the origin of dyslexia is mostly biological.

As of 2003, current models of the relation between the brain and dyslexia generally focus on some form of defective or delayed brain maturation. More recently, genetic research has provided increasing evidence supporting a genetic origin of dyslexia.

In 2004, a University of Hong Kong study argues that dyslexia affects different structural parts of children's brains depending on the language which the children read.

As of 2007, researchers Lyytinen et al. are searching for a link between the neurological and genetic findings, and the reading disorder. There are many previous and current theories of dyslexia, but one that has much support from research is that, whatever the biological cause, dyslexia is a matter of reduced phonological awareness, the ability to analyze and link the units of spoken and written languages.

In 2008, S Heim et al. was one of the first studies not to just compare dyslexics with a non dyslexic control, but to go further and compare the different cognitive sub groups with a non dyslexic control group. Different theories conceptualise dyslexia as either a phonological, attentional, auditory, magnocellular, or automatisation deficit. Such heterogeneity suggests the existence of yet unrecognised subtypes of dyslexics with distinguishable deficits. The purpose of the study was to identify cognitive subtypes of dyslexia. Out of 642 children screened for reading ability 49 dyslexics and 48 controls were tested for phonological awareness, auditory discrimination, motion detection, visual attention, and rhythm imitation. A combined cluster and discriminant analysis approach revealed three clusters of dyslexics with different cognitive deficits. Compared to reading-unimpaired children cluster no. 1 had worse phonological awareness; cluster no. 2 had higher attentional costs; cluster no. 3 performed worse in the phonological, auditory, and magnocellular tasks. These results indicate that dyslexia may result from distinct cognitive impairments. As a consequence, prevention and remediation programmes should be specifically targeted for the individual child's deficit pattern.

Also in 2008, Wai Ting Siok et al. describe how dyslexia is language dependent, and especially between alphabetic and non-alphabetic writing systems.

In 2010, KK Chung et al. investigated the "Cognitive profiles of Hong Kong Chinese adolescents with dyslexia".
