= List of phonics programs =

A list of commercial phonics programs designed for teaching reading in English (arranged by country of origin to acknowledge regional language variations).

== United States ==
- Open Court Reading; name changed to "Imagine It!" in 2008
- Orton-Gillingham
- Phono-graphix (1993) – developed by Carmen and Geoffrey McGuinness
- Preventing Academic Failure (PAF) program (1978)
- Reading Mastery by SRA/McGraw-Hill, previously known as DISTAR
- Smart Way Reading and Spelling (2001)
- Spalding Method
- Hooked on Phonics

== Online and software programs ==
- JumpStart Phonics
- Starfall (website)

== See also ==
- Phonics
- Reading
- Synthetic phonics
