= Beth Slingerland =

American educator (1900–1989)

Beth Slingerland was an educator who developed a classroom adaptation of the Orton-Gillingham system for teaching dyslexic children.

== Life ==
Slingerland was born in Santa Rosa, California in 1900. She studied education at San Francisco State University, and has a degree from Seattle Pacific University.

=== Career ===
While the director of the lower school at the Punahou School in Hawaii from 1938-1945. she became interested in the issue of reading challenges faced by some students. While in Hawaii, she worked with Anna Gillingham and Bessie Stillman on a multisensory method to help dyslexics learn to read. In the late 1940s she became the coordinator of a language disability program in the Renton, Washington school district where she worked until 1965. In 1977, she founded the Slingerland Institute in Bellevue, Washington.

Slingerland's classroom adaptation of the Orton-Gillingham system is called the Slingerland Screening for Identifying Children with Specific Language Disability, or the 'Slingerland Method' for short. The test screens to identify language disabilities and is divided into eight subtests. Slingerhand's work in the field of dyslexia included advocating for increased funding to support training and teaching the methods needed for dyslexic children.

=== Pearl Harbor ===
On December 7, 1941, Beth was a witness to the bombing of Pearl Harbor. Her Husband, John Slingerland, was a civilian employee on the naval base. She witnessed these attacks from her home in the hills above the harbor, and described the scene she saw in a detailed letter to her mother and father. Throughout the letter, she describes with time stamps: the sounds of guns, smoke rolling over the hills, and her worries for her husband. In the letter, she states, “ I have to do something because I can see the smoke pouring up into the air from Pearl Harbor and the sound of the guns and the bombs bursting in the water right before us keeps me in such a nervous state that I must do something. John is at Pearl Harbor.” She also describes partially what her husband witnessed.

=== Death and legacy ===
The Institute trains 600 teachers in the US and Canada and recently opened a training program in Australia. She died in Seattle in March 1989 at 89 years old.

== Awards and honors ==
In 1972 the Orton Society, now known as the International Dyslexia Association honored Slingerland with their highest honor, the Samuel Torrey Orton Award.
