= Barbara Solomon =

Barbara Solomon may refer to:

- Barbara Miller Solomon (1919–1992), American historian
- Barbara Probst Solomon (1928–2019), American author, essayist and journalist

== See also ==
- Barbara Stauffacher Solomon (1928–2024), American landscape artist and graphic designer
