= Maida Herman Solomon =

American psychiatric social worker

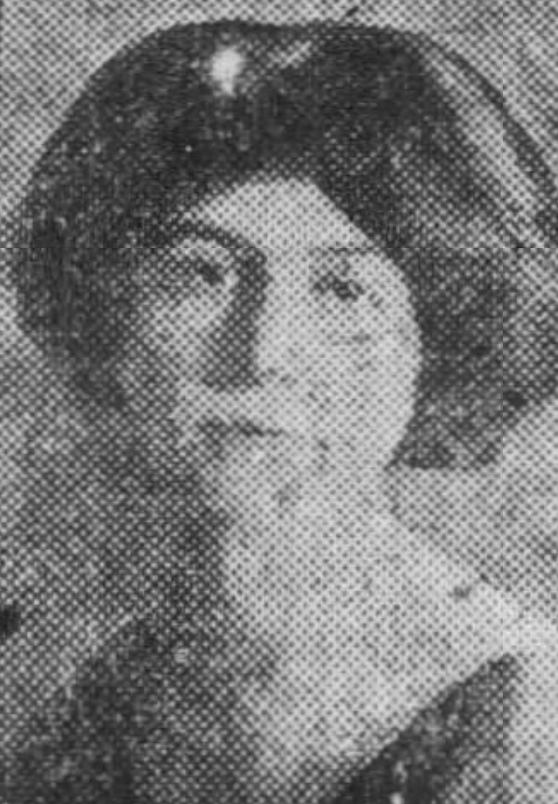
- Maida Herman, from a 1915 newspaper
- Born: March 9, 1891; Boston, Massachusetts, U.S.
- Died: January 25, 1988 (age 96); Boston, Massachusetts, U.S.
- Occupations: Psychiatric social worker, researcher, writer, activist
- Spouse: Harry C. Solomon
- Relatives: Lina Frank Hecht (great-aunt); Barbara Miller Solomon (daughter-in-law)

Maida Herman Solomon (March 9, 1891 – January 25, 1988) was an American psychiatric social worker, college professor, writer, researcher, and advocate for sex education and community mental health services. She was a founder and first president of the American Association of Psychiatric Social Workers.

== Early life and education ==
Herman was born in Boston, the daughter of Joseph Herman and Hannah Adler Herman. Her father was a shoe manufacturer. Her family was Jewish; her great-aunt was philanthropist Lina Frank Hecht. She attended Boston Girls' Latin School and graduated from Smith College in 1912. She completed a secretarial course at Simmons College in 1914.

== Career ==
In 1915, Solomon was secretary of Boston's Union Park Forum, and marched in a parade for women's suffrage. She was a psychiatric social worker at Boston Psychopathic Hospital beginning in 1916. She served on the board of Hecht House, a Jewish settlement house. In 1926 she was a founder and first president of the American Association of Psychiatric Social Workers.

From 1934 to 1957, Solomon was a professor of social economy at Simmons College. After she retired from Simmons, she became a consultant in Boston, and head of a research team in psychiatric social work. She was awarded the Smith College Medal in 1979.

Solomon was active in the Boston Community Fund, the American Red Cross, Beth Israel Hospital, the Massachusetts Conference of Social Workers, and many other organizations in Boston.

== Publications ==
Solomon co-wrote several books; her articles appeared in scholarly journals including The American Journal of Psychiatry and The Journal of Abnormal and Social Psychology.

- The Field of Social Service (1915, co-editor)
- "The Family of the Neurosyphilitic" (1918, with Harry C. Solomon)
- Syphilis of the Innocent (1922, with Harry C. Solomon)
- "The Problem of the Supply of Psychiatric Social Workers for State Hospitals" (1928, with June F. Lyday)
- "Extramural Psychiatry and Affiliated Services" (1944, with George S. Stevenson, Mary E. Corcoran, and Beatrice D. Wade)
- "The Family as a Potential Resource for the Rehabilitation of the Chronic Schizophrenic Patient: A Study of 60 Patients and their Families" (1961, with Anne S. Evans and Dexter M. Bullard Jr.)
- The Prevention of Hospitalization: Treatment Without Admission for Psychiatric Patients (1963, with Milton Greenblatt, Robert F. Moore, and Robert S. Albert)
- Drug and social therapy in chronic schizophrenia (1965, with Milton Greenblatt, Betty Ann Glasser, Anne S. Evans, and G. W. Brooks)
- Adolescents in a Mental Hospital (1968, with Ernest Hartmann, Milton Greenblatt, and Daniel Levinson)
- "A 10-Year Follow-Up of 55 Hospitalized Adolescents" (1974, with Elizabeth G. Herrera, Betty Glasser Lifson, and Ernest Hartmann)

== Personal life ==
Maida Herman married psychiatrist Harry C. Solomon in 1916. They had four children, Peter, Joseph, Babette, and Eric. Her husband died in 1982, and she died in 1988, at the age of 96. Her papers are in the Schlesinger Library and the Simmons College Archives. In 2004, a collection of essays and documents, and her memoir, were published as Carrying a Banner for Psychiatric Social Work: Essays, Perspectives, and Maida Herman Solomon's Oral Memoir. Historian Barbara Miller Solomon was her daughter-in-law.
