= Grace Fernald =

American psychologist

Grace Maxwell Fernald
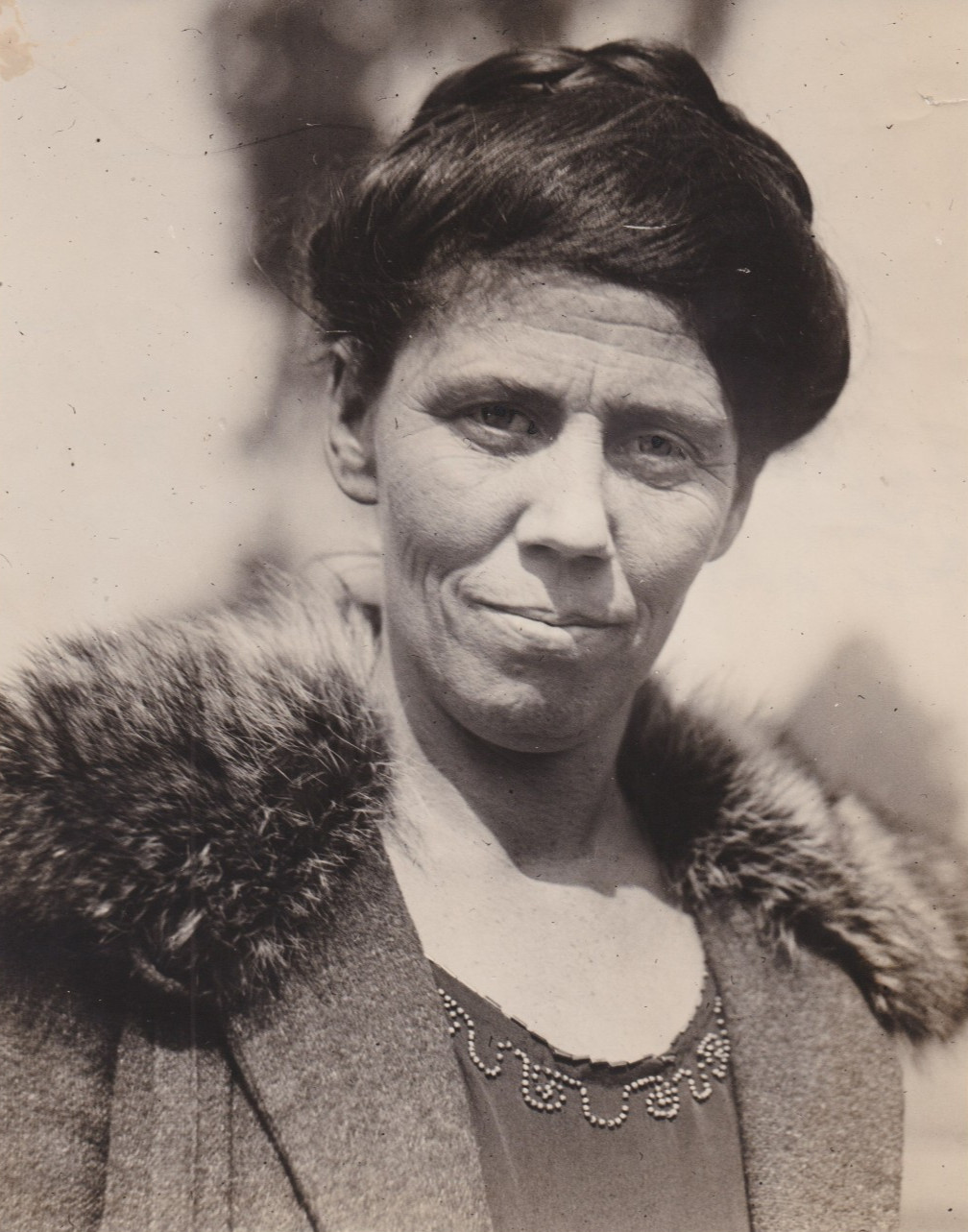
- Fernald c. 1923
- Born: November 29, 1879; Clyde, Ohio, U.S.
- Died: January 16, 1950 (aged 70)
- Education: Dartmouth College; Yale University; Harvard University
- Scientific career
- Fields: Educational psychology
- Workplaces: Ohio State University; University of Illinois Chicago

Grace Maxwell Fernald (November 29, 1879 – January 16, 1950) was an educational psychologist and influential figure in early twentieth century literacy education. Fernald established "the first clinic for remedial instruction in 1921 at the University of California, Los Angeles". Tracing tactile learning tendencies back to Quintilian, Séguin, and Montessori, Fernald's kinesthetic spelling and reading method prompted struggling students to trace words. Years of research culminated in 1943 with her classic work, Remedial Techniques in Basic School Subjects. The popular kinesthetic method anchors modern instruction in the areas of special education and remedial reading. Kinesthetic learning is also included as one of Howard Gardner's multiple intelligences. Fernald's notion of incorporating the physical with the auditory, verbal, and visual elements of reading instruction, now known as "VAKT", multimodal learning, or multisensory imagery, continues to guide educators today.

== Early years and education ==
Grace Maxwell Fernald was born on November 29, 1879, in Clyde, Ohio. Following a youth spent in New York and New Jersey, Fernald graduated from high school and then attended college at Mount Holyoke and Bryn Mawr. In 1907 she received her doctorate in psychology from the University of Chicago. By 1911 Fernald had accepted a position at UCLA. She eventually became head of the Psychology Department and Laboratory at the State Normal School. It was at the UCLA clinic where her research into the reading and writing processes gained fame.

== Early research of the Fernald method ==
The 1921 Journal of Educational Research contains Fernald's foundational study of four boys who learn to spell and read by her kinesthetic method. This method influenced other researchers working at the same time in the field of reading difficulties. Notable examples include Samuel Orton and Anna Gillingham. The article in the Journal of Educational Research, "The Effect of Kinaesthetic Factors in the Development of Word Recognition in the Case of Non-Readers", outlines five phases of the kinesthetic method. With an emphasis on student choice, focal words are generated by the students during the first stage. Each word is introduced by the teacher who writes it on the chalkboard. The student repeats the word while tracing it on the board. When the student is confident that he knows the word, he attempts to write it while saying each syllable. Successful word study is followed by phase two where sentences are created in a similar fashion. The third step incorporates a student-selected book where words from specific paragraphs are isolated for reading. In the fourth phase, the student is asked to read whole phrases from the paragraphs. Finally, the student is encouraged to do silent reading on his own for the fifth phase. After some time all four boys successfully learned to read well enough to perform at grade level. Follow-ups with the participants reflected the maintenance of reading levels and for some avid readers, additional leaps in reading proficiency. Though not asserting widespread generalizability, Fernald and Keller enumerate several findings. One conclusion of interest today describes each student learning by analogy, demonstrating the "ability to pronounce new words if they resemble words he has already learned." This is a compensatory strategy currently used. Warren's 1977 dissertation study with children exhibiting mild forms of reading problems demonstrated 147% and 77% superior word recognition and comprehension respectively by Fernald tracing compared to Orton-Gillingham phonics, although O-G was 10% more effective in word decoding.

== Career summary ==
On the eve of Fernald's retirement from the UCLA clinic, Time magazine (July 12, 1948) highlights the story of one boy's reading adventure in Fernald's clinic. The title of the article, "Reading by Touch" aptly reflects the Fernald method. Stepping down after 27 years, Fernald sums up the theory behind her "kinesthetic method" with the explanation that "reading difficulties occur most frequently in people who lack the ability to summon up a mental picture of the way a word looks". Her only requirements for entrance into the clinic program were for students to have average intelligence and for parents to continue with the clinic as long as necessary. According to Time, remediation required from "two months to two years" for the students to reach their grade level reading equivalent. Though the article includes some criticism of the Fernald method, in the end it is a positive portrayal of a committed educator. A clinic at UCLA bears her name to this day. Critics typically do not follow the tracing directions with fidelity, such making small changes such as orally spelling the individual letters in the word rather than saying/blending the sounds of the word. Strict adherence to the steps is required for the process to be "Fernald," and any changes interfere with the development of automatic mastery. The Fernald tracing approach to spelling, traditionally speaking, is not oral spelling at all; it is creating the mental visualization of the word for the purpose of correct written spelling and proofing. Oral spelling for students experiencing problems creates interference with acquiring correct visualization.

== A child's view of Fernald's method ==
A more powerful account of the influence of the kinesthetic method practiced in Fernald's clinic is presented by the International Reading Association’s Special Interest Group in the history of reading. In the spring 1998 edition of the History of Reading News a former student of Fernald's kinesthetic method recalls his experiences in the clinic setting. He describes a typical session with one of the student teachers where there was even finger painting. The student, now an esteemed doctor, researcher, and chair of psychiatry at a major New York hospital, wonders about the "life changes for some of the other boys as a result of her help and ministrations." He admits that he "still uses aspects of the Fernald method to this day."

== A parent's view of Fernald's method ==
An additional article written by the mother of the same former student was also included in the 1998 edition of the History of Reading News. Though not as detailed, the passage reminds educators that their work impacts not only the student, but the entire family. The parents contacted Grace Fernald in an effort to support their intelligent second-grade son who was struggling in school. The mother even recounts a visit to Fernald's home. Grace Fernald, the caring teacher, comes alive through these two touching accounts of one boy's success story.

== Influence on education ==
Upon Fernald's passing in 1950, her peers praised the tremendous impact of her UCLA clinic endeavors. "Grace Fernald developed and directed the clinical school. The children and adults helped by study and treatment in this clinic and the teachers and psychologists observing and learning in the clinic school run into the thousands."

The Fernald Center for Early Care and Education at UCLA is named in her honor.

Fernald's Remedial Techniques in Basic School Subjects was favourably reviewed by J Bald in The Times Educational Supplement, 9.7.1982. The book contains valuable techniques for teaching grammar, arithmetic and foreign languages. It remains one of the most important collections of case study research in its field (the case studies were omitted from the reprinted edition).
