= Spalding Method =

The Spalding Method teaches reading by focusing first on phonics and writing. It was developed by Romalda Bishop Spalding in the late 1950s as a multidisciplinary educational tool.

== The Method ==
Romalda Bishop, in her book Spalding, The Spalding Writing Road to Reading, first published in 1957 and revived in 1990. This method aims to teach students how written language works as early and efficiently as possible so they can excel in other areas of literacy. Specifically, Spalding emphasizes building early spelling and handwriting skills, allowing children to skip the process of learning to read via controlled vocabulary practices. It encourages educators to concentrate on transmitting comprehension and thinking skills.

== Romalda Bishop Spalding ==
Spalding is an American educator who used her book The Spalding Writing Road to Reading to develop a method of teaching children to read called The Spalding Method. This work was inspired by concerns she developed as a young teacher about slow learners. She believed teaching language to children was the highest profession, which inspired her to spend several years studying with Dr. Samuel Orton at the Orton Dyslexia Society.

== See also ==
- Dyslexia
- List of Phonics Programs
- Orton-Gillingham
- Samuel Orton
