= Bessie Stillman =

Teacher focused on students with reading disabilities

Bessie Whitmore Stillman (1871-1947) was an educator and contributor to the Orton-Gillingham teaching method for students with disabilities in reading.

== Career ==
Stillman was a teacher at the Ethical Culture School in New York when she met Anna Gillingham. She began collaborating to further develop the teaching procedures of Samuel Orton, devised to help readers with dyslexia. Gillingham and Stillman completed a remedial program called "The Alphabetic Method," which taught phonemes, morphemes and spelling rules through multisensory techniques. Gillingham published "The Alphabetic Method" in 1936. This later became known as the Orton-Gillingham method.

During this time (1935-1937) Stillman worked and studied with Gillingham at the Punahou School in Honolulu, Hawaii. There they trained and collaborated with Beth Slingerland, who adapted the Orton-Gillingham method also called the Orton-Gillingham-Stillman Method, for use in classrooms. The method involves teaching dyslexics with a multisensory approach.

Stillman worked with Gillingham until her death in 1947.

== Publications ==
In 1922, an essay by Stillman titled "School Excursions" was published in volume 22 of The Elementary School Journal. Stillman's first book, Training Children to Study; Practical Suggestions, was published in 1928. The first edition of The Gillingham Manual: Remedial Training for Children with Specific Disability in Reading, Spelling, and Penmanship, (originally "The Alphabetic Method") was written by Gillingham and Stillman, and published in 1936. This is the manual through which the Orton-Gillingham method is still largely taught today, with the 8th edition published in 1997. In the preface of later editions, Gillingham noted that certain sections were largely the late Stillman's work, to the point that she could not bring herself to edit them.
