= Viewegsgarten-Bebelhof =

- Borough of Braunschweig
- Viewegs Garten

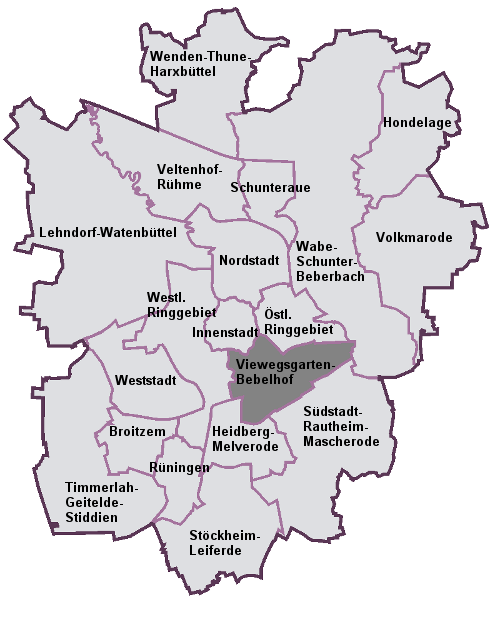
- Location of Viewegsgarten-Bebelhof within Braunschweig
- Interactive map of Viewegsgarten-Bebelhof
- Location within Germany Location within Lower Saxony
- Coordinates: 52°15′2.9″N 10°32′48.2″E
- Country: Germany
- State: Lower Saxony
- District: urban district
- City: Braunschweig

Government
  - Mayor: Frank Flake (SPD)

Area
  - Total: 6.71 km^{2} (2.59 sq mi)

Population (2020-12-31)
  - Total: 13,121
  - Density: 1,960/km^{2} (5,060/sq mi)
- Time zone: UTC+01:00 (CET)
  - Summer (DST): UTC+02:00 (CEST)
- Postal codes: 38102, 38126, 38124
- Dialling codes: 0531
- Vehicle registration: BS

Viewegsgarten-Bebelhof is a Stadtbezirk (borough) in the southern part of Braunschweig, Germany. The district has a population of 13,121 (2020).

== History and geography ==
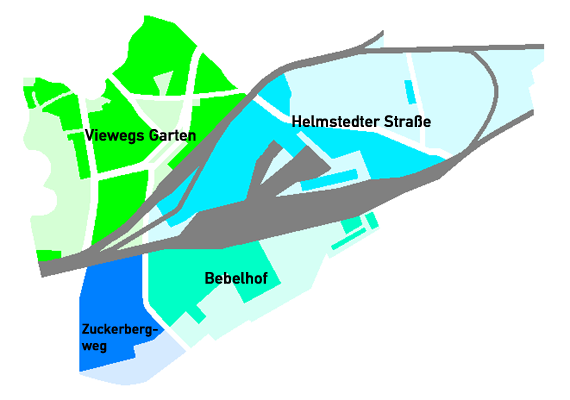
Map of Viewegsgarten-Bebelhof

The district of Viewegsgarten-Bebelhof was established in 1981. It is named after Bebelhof, a working-class quarter built in the 1920s and the urban park Viewegs Garten, established in the late 18th century.

In the 12th century, a lazar house and chapel, St. Leonhard, was established outside the city of Braunschweig. Urban expansion caused the village of St. Leonhard to merge into the city during the 19th century, today making up the northeastern part of Viewegsgarten-Bebelhof. From the mid-19th century on, industrialisation caused rapid population growth in the area. Several factories, including Büssing, Voigtländer, Rollei, and the Wolters and Feldschlößchen breweries, were built around Viewegs Garten.

In 1944, the KZ-Außenlager Schillstraße, a subcamp of the Neuengamme concentration camp, was established in the northern part of today's district.

In the 1950s, Braunschweig Hauptbahnhof, the city's new main train station, was built near Viewegs Garten. The station opened on 1 October 1960.

== Politics ==
The district mayor Frank Flake is a member of the Social Democratic Party of Germany.

== Landmarks ==
- The historic cemetery Dom- und St. Magnifriedhof, commonly known as Magnifriedhof. Burials in the cemetery include Joachim Heinrich Campe, Johann Joachim Eschenburg, Friedrich Gerstäcker, Georg Ferdinand Howaldt, Ernst August Friedrich Klingemann, Friedrich Ludwig Knapp, Peter Joseph Krahe, Gotthold Ephraim Lessing, Carl Theodor Ottmer, and Friedrich Vieweg.
- The Hauptfriedhof Braunschweig, Braunschweig's main cemetery. Burials in the cemetery include Oswald Berkhan, Richard Dedekind, Walter Dexel, Wilhelm Raabe, Norbert Schultze, and Hans Sommer.
- The neo-Gothic church St. Johannis.
- The Schill-Denkmal, a monument, erected in 1837, for Ferdinand von Schill and 14 of his soldiers, who had been executed in Braunschweig after Schill's failed revolt against French domination in 1809.
- The memorial Gedenkstätte KZ-Außenlager Schillstraße.
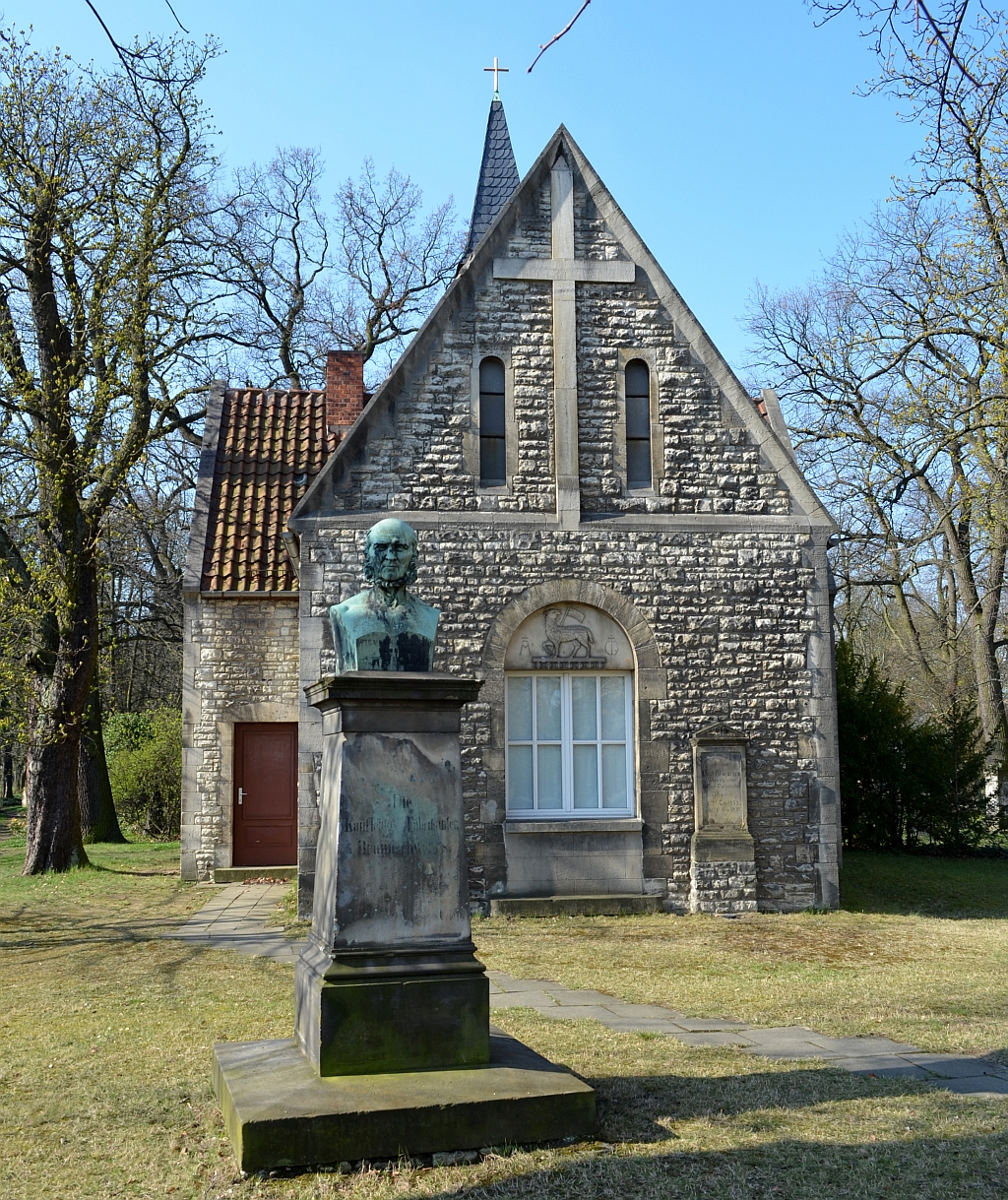
Dom- und St. Magnifriedhof

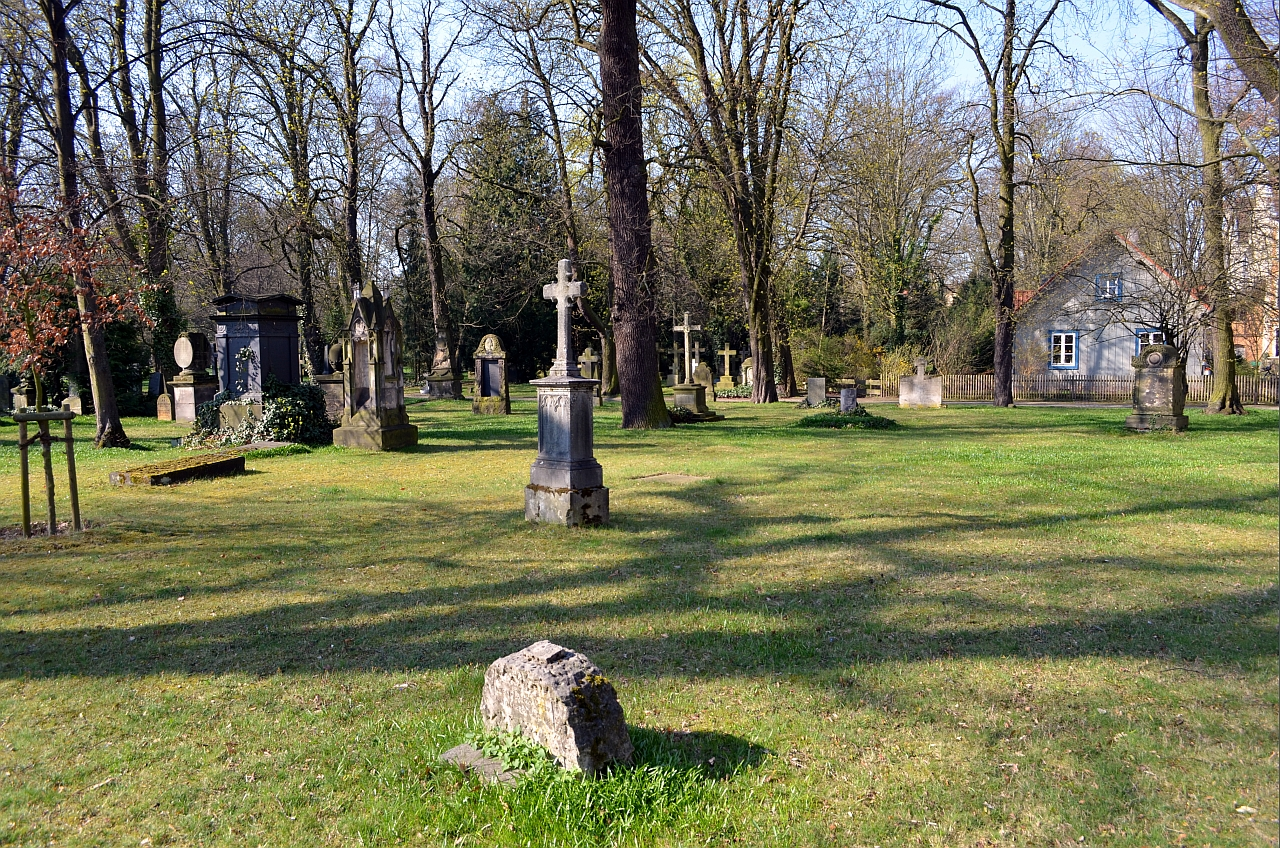
Dom- und St. Magnifriedhof

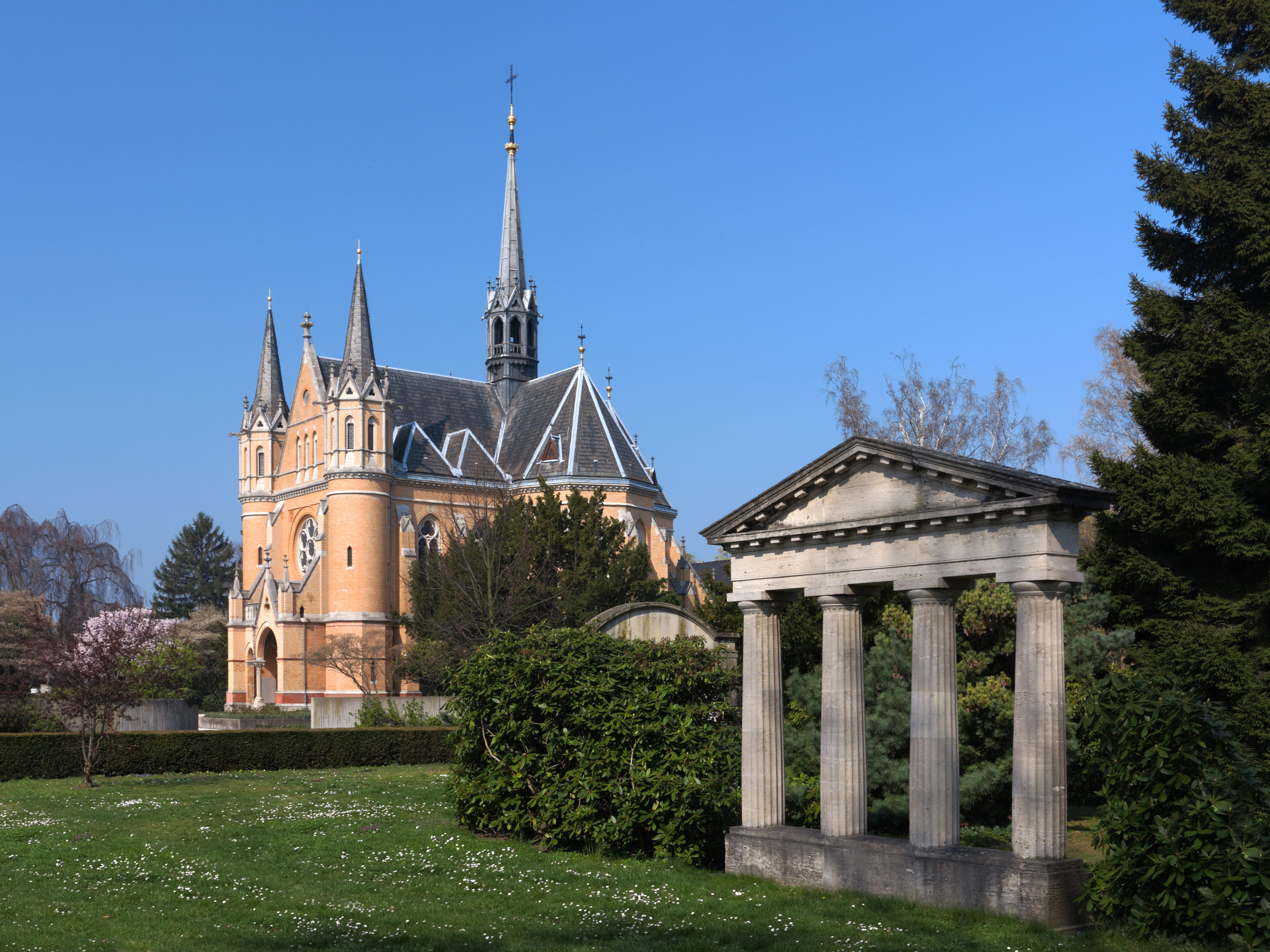
Hauptfriedhof Braunschweig

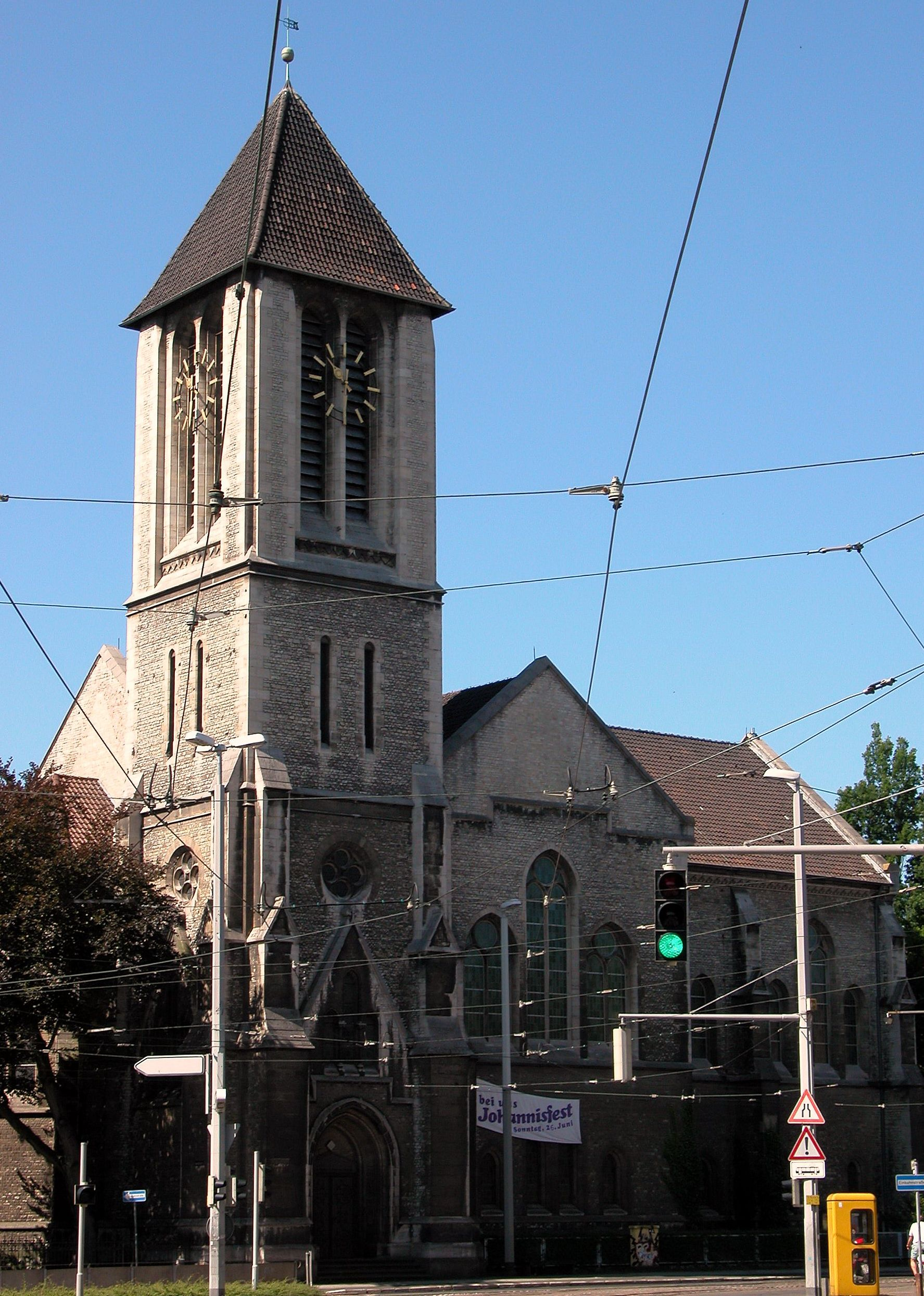
St. Johannis

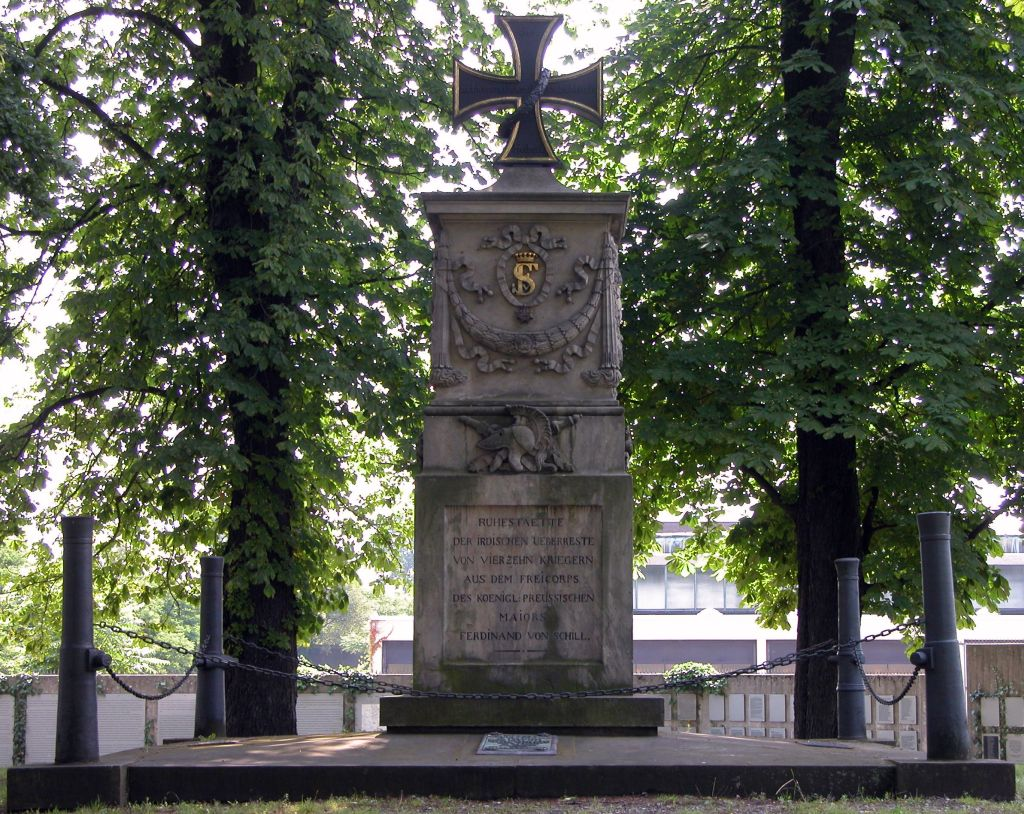
Schill-Denkmal

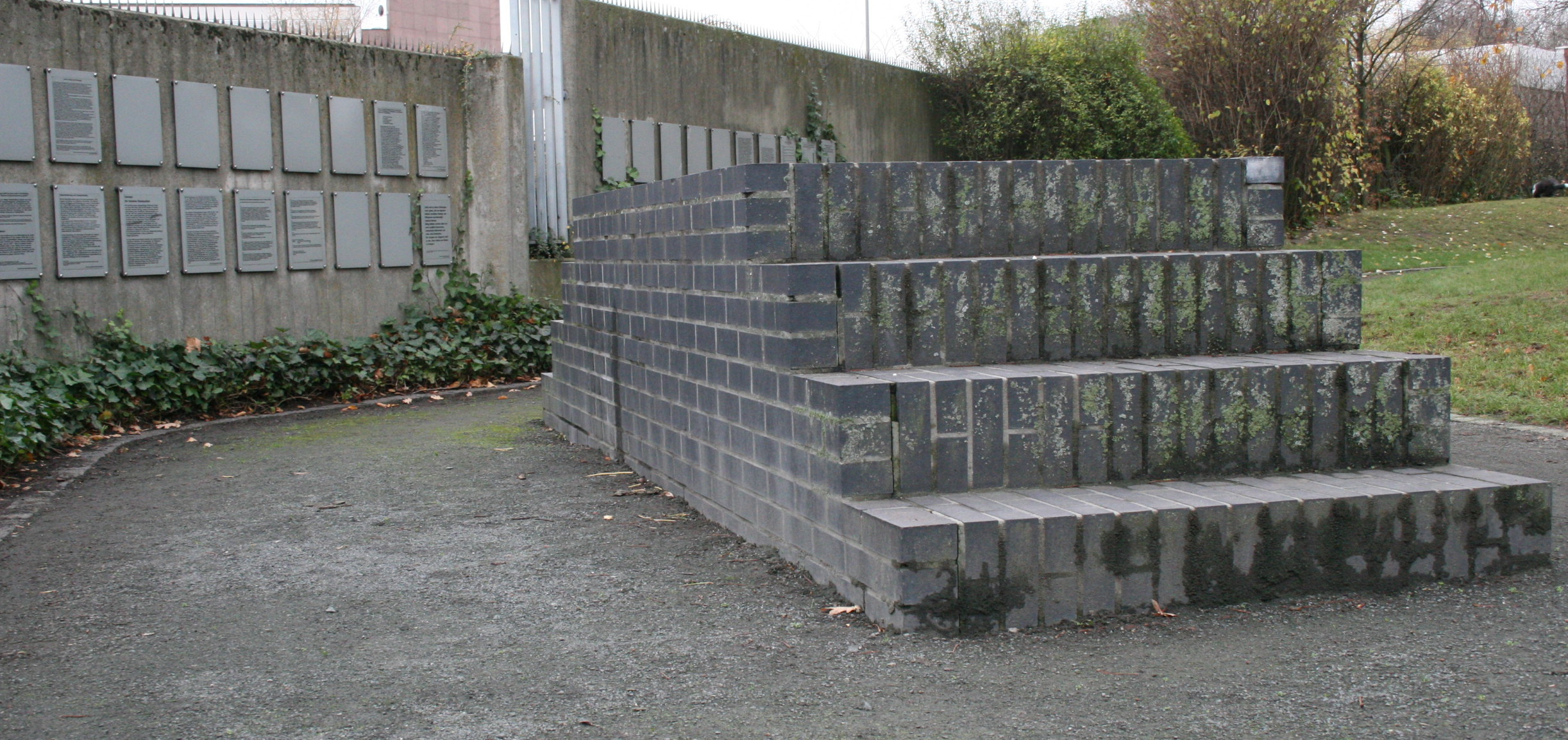
Gedenkstätte KZ-Außenlager Schillstraße
