= Touch-type Read and Spell =

Computer program that uses the Orton-Gillingham Method to teach phonics and typing

Touch-type Read and Spell is a computer program that uses the Orton-Gillingham Method to teach phonics and typing. It is a multi-sensory approach. Keyboarding lessons present words on the screen, play them aloud and provide visual cues of the intended hand movements. The program is multi-step and focuses on accuracy over speed. This makes it appropriate for students with dyslexia and other specific learning differences, ADHD, dyspraxia, adults who struggle with literacy skills and aphasic individuals recovering from a stroke. TTRS has been featured in the Guardian and Forbes and the course and its approach are commonly discussed in books concerning special needs classroom instruction and dyslexia.
