= Harry C. Solomon =

American physician

Harry Caesar Solomon (25 October 1889 – 23 May 1982), an American neurologist, psychiatrist, researcher, administrator, and clinician, was among the first to advocate for major changes in public psychiatry. He called for the closure of large, public mental hospitals and replaced with community-based facilities.

== Early life ==
Solomon was born in Hastings, Nebraska. His family moved to Los Angeles, California where he received his early education. He earned his B.S. degree at the University of California, Berkeley in 1910, and his medical degree from Harvard Medical School in 1914. His entered the field of neurology and psychiatry during his second year at Harvard while studying at the State Lunatic Hospital at Danvers, Massachusetts.

The Boston Psychopathic Hospital opened in 1912 as a division of the Boston State Hospital. Solomon took his internship and his residency there, then hired as a staff physician. Dr. Elmer E. Southard, the Bullard professor of Neuropathology at Harvard University was then the Superintendent of the Boston Psychopathic Hospital and Solomon studied under him. On June 27, 1916, Solomon married Maida Herman. Maida joined him at the Boston Psychopathic Hospital, where she soon became prominent figure in the developing field of psychiatric social work. Neurosyphilis frequently occurrence then, and in 1917, Solomon and Southard co-authored a book on its diagnosis and treatment. Solomon served at a U.S. Army base hospital in France during World War I.

Solomon remained at Boston Psychopathic Hospital and was its superintendent from 1943 to 1958. He was also Chair of the Department of Psychiatry at the Harvard Medical School. He left the hospital to become the Massachusetts State Commissioner of Mental Health and served in this position from 1958 to 1967. During these years, he was regarded as a major leader in American psychiatry and neurology.

He was active in numerous professional associations: American Psychiatric Association (APA, president, 1957–1958), Boston Society of Neurology and Psychiatry (president, 1928–1929), New England Society of Psychiatry (president, 1938–1939), American Neurological Association (president, 1941), Massachusetts Psychiatric Society, Association of Biological Psychiatry (president, 1950), Association for Research in Nervous and Mental Diseases, and American Psychopathological Association. He was widely sought as a consultant and advisor to the Massachusetts General Hospital, the Veterans Administration, the National Research Council, and during World War II, the Selective Service Board.

In 1958, during his presidential year at the American Psychiatric Association, he startled the profession by declaring that the large public mental hospitals were antiquated, outmoded, and rapidly becoming obsolete, and that they should be liquidated. In their place, he urged for community health centers, psychiatric wards in general hospitals, and other types of rehabilitative facilities. Solomon authored and co-authored numerous books and journal articles.

== Works ==
- Southard, Elmer E., and Harry C. Solomon. Neurosyphilis, Modern Systematic Diagnosis and Treatment Presented in One Hundred and Thirty-seven Case Histories. Boston, W.M. Leonard, Boston, 1917. https://archive.org/details/neurosyphilismod00sout
- Solomon, Harry C., and Maida H. Solomon. Syphilis of the Innocent: A Study of the Social Effects of Syphilis on the Family and the Community, with 152 Illustrative Cases, made under a Grant from the United States Interdepartmental Social Hygiene Board. Washington, United States Interdepartmental Social Hygiene Board, 1922.
- Solomon, Harry C., and Paul I. Yakovlev, eds. Manual of Military Neuropsychiatry. Philadelphia, Saunders, 1945.
- Merritt, H. Houston, Raymond D. Adams, and Harry C. Solomon. Neurosyphilis. New York: Oxford University Press, [1946].
- Greenblatt, Milton, and Harry C. Solomon, eds. Frontal Lobes and Schizophrenia: Second Lobotomy Project of Boston Psychopathic Hospital. New York: Springer, 1953.
- Solomon, Harry C. "Some Historical Perspectives," Mental Hospitals 9(2) (February 1958): 5–7.
- Solomon, Harry C. "Hospital Psychiatry Today," Mental Hospitals 11(8) (October 1960): 14–17.
