= Marburn Academy =

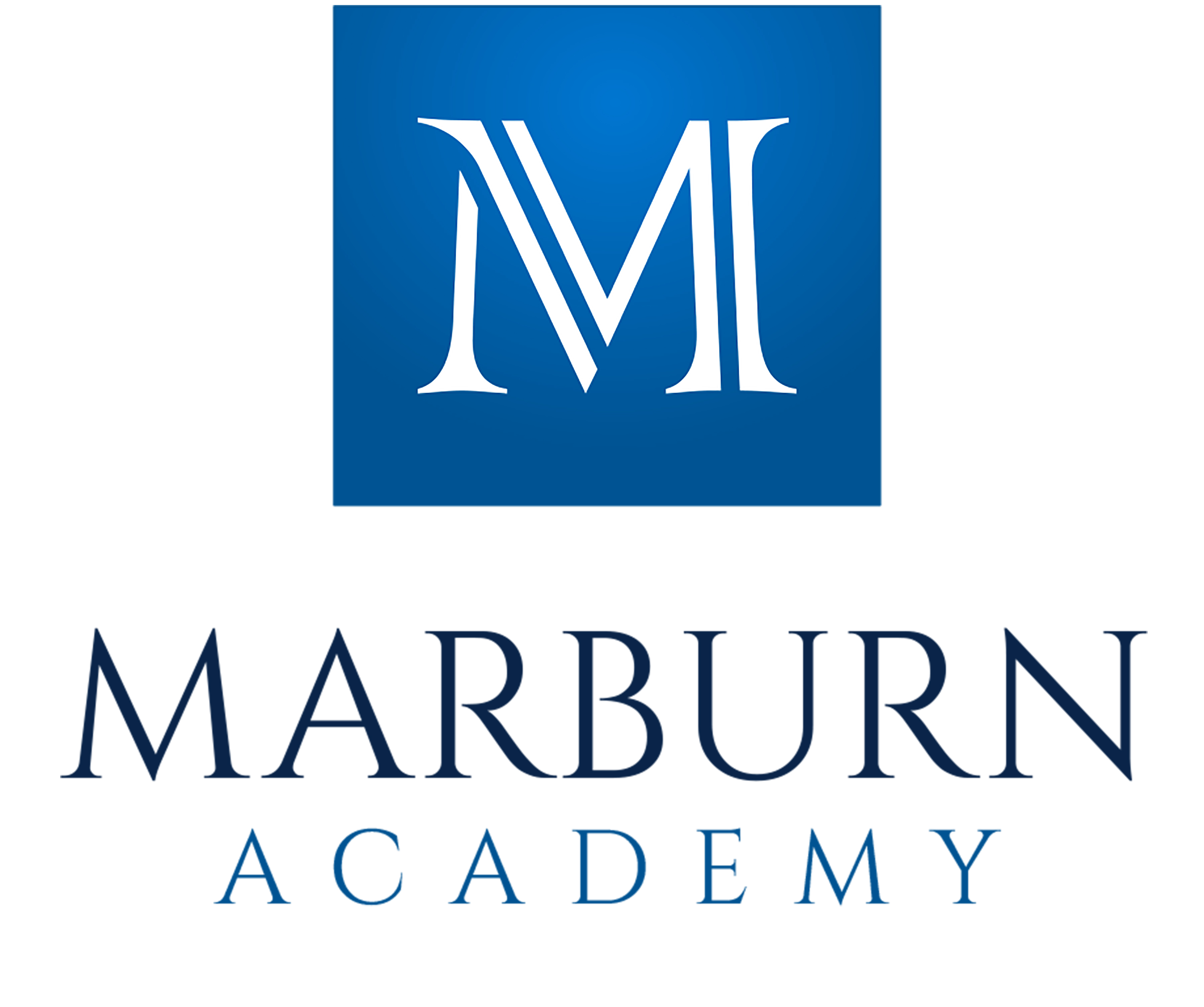

Location
- 9555 Johnstown Rd, New Albany; Ohio 43054; United States; 40°4′53.1″N 82°58′04″W

Information
- Type: Private, co-educational
- Established: 1981; 45 years ago
- Head of school: Eldrich Carr
- Grades: 1–12
- Color: Blue
- Team name: Panthers
- Accreditation: Ohio Association of Independent Schools; Independent Schools Association of the Central States; National Association of Independent Schools; Academy of Orton-Gillingham Practitioners and Educators
- Interim Associate Head of School: Jennifer Martin-Gledhill
- Website: www.marburnacademy.org

Marburn Academy is a non-profit independent day school for students in grades 1–12 school in New Albany, Ohio. The school was created in 1981 as an alternative for gifted students who have ADHD or dyslexia. The school is one of 18 accredited Orton-Gillingham schools in the United States.

In January 2017, Marburn Academy moved from Forest Park East, Columbus, to a new location at 9555 Johnstown Road, New Albany, Ohio 43054.
