= Rockhampton Hospital =

- Queensland Health
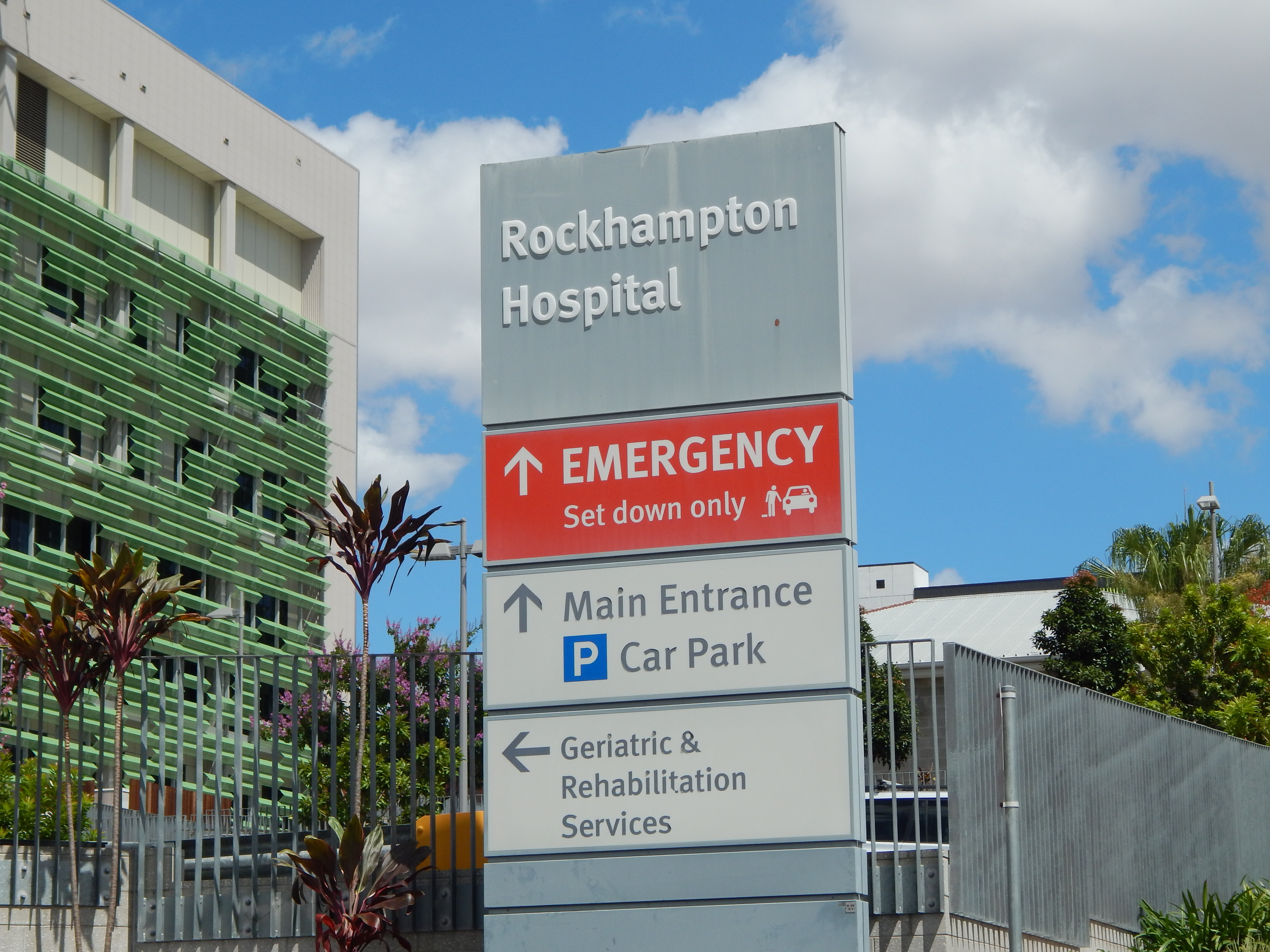
- Signage at Rockhampton Hospital, 2019

Geography
- Location: 2 Canning Street, The Range, Rockhampton, Queensland, Australia
- Coordinates: 23.3797°S 150.4943°E

Organisation
- Care system: Public Medicare (Australia)
- Type: Tertiary Referral
- Affiliated university: Central Queensland University

Services
- Emergency department: Yes
- Beds: 300

Helipads
- Helipad: ICAO: YXRK
Number	Length		Surface
Number	ft	m	Surface
1			stainless steel

History
- Founded: unknown

Links
- Website: Official Website

Rockhampton Hospital is the largest major hospital in Central Queensland, Australia. Operated by Queensland Health as a public hospital, the hospital offers a wide range of medical services to a population of about 230,000 throughout the Rockhampton, Gladstone, the Capricorn Coast and Emerald communities.

== Geography ==
The hospital is located in The Range about 4 km from the Rockhampton CBD, on a block bounded by Canning Street, North Street and Quarry Street.

== History ==
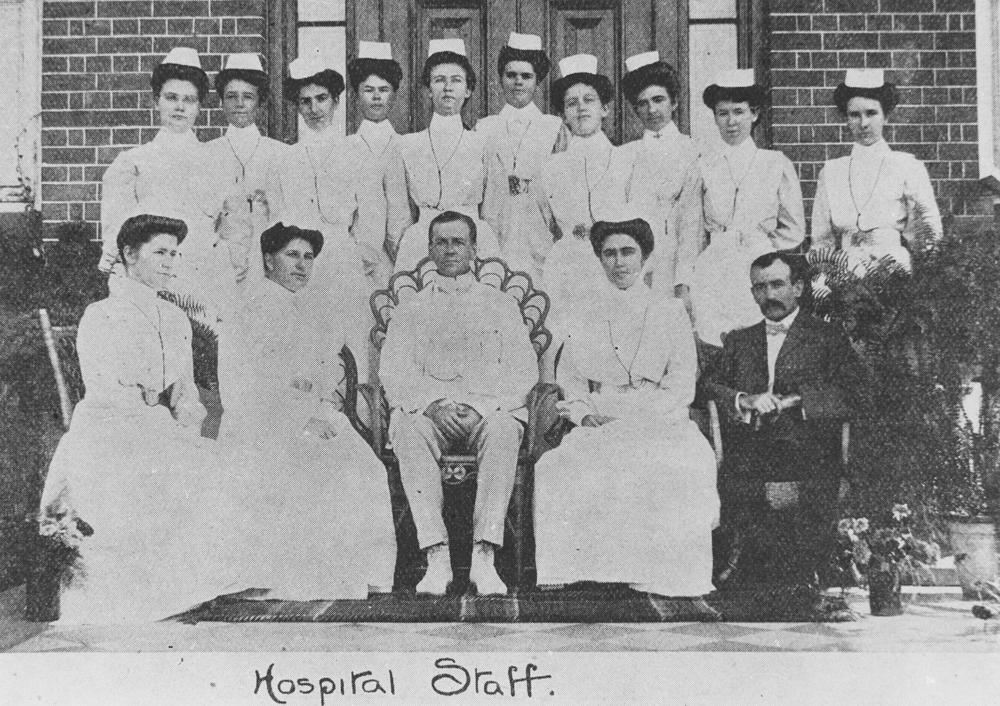
Nursing staff at Rockhampton Hospital, circa 1908

The Rockhampton Hospital site at The Range was established in 1867, and was the second site of a hospital in the city. However, none of the buildings from the 19th century survive. The present buildings of the hospital are from the 20th and 21st century. Two of the 20th century buildings are heritage listed:

- a medical superintendent's residence constructed in 1936
- the Therapies Building (a former Outpatients Department incorporating the purpose-built Kenny Clinic built in 1938 to implement the physical therapies of Sister Elizabeth Kenny for the treatment of poliomyelitis)

Other buildings of note that were once situated on the Rockhampton Hospital site include the Lady Goodwin Maternity Hospital (a maternity hospital opened in 1930 named in honour of the wife of Queensland Governor John Goodwin, demolished in 1986), the Rockhampton Hospital Nurses' Quarters (a five-storey accommodation building opened in 1954 and demolished in 2008) and the original Rockhampton Hospital Post Office (an on-site post office opened in 1949 and relocated in 2018).

=== Name change ===
In 1998, the name of the hospital was changed from Rockhampton Base Hospital to Rockhampton Hospital.

The term "base hospital" is now considered by some hospital boards to be archaic and redundant.

Regional hospitals were initially named and classified as "base hospitals" in an attempt to secure funding but can now be potentially confusing for tourists who associate the word with military.

After the name change, all signage at Rockhampton Hospital was amended to remove the word "base".

Hospitals in other regional Queensland cities followed suit, such as in Cairns where the hospital name was similarly changed from Cairns Base Hospital to Cairns Hospital in 2013 with the hospital board there regarding the word "base" as not correctly reflecting the number and complexity of services provided by the hospital.

Despite no longer being called Rockhampton Base Hospital, local media, politicians and community members continue to incorrectly refer to the hospital by its former name.

== Redevelopment ==
=== Cancer Services Building ===
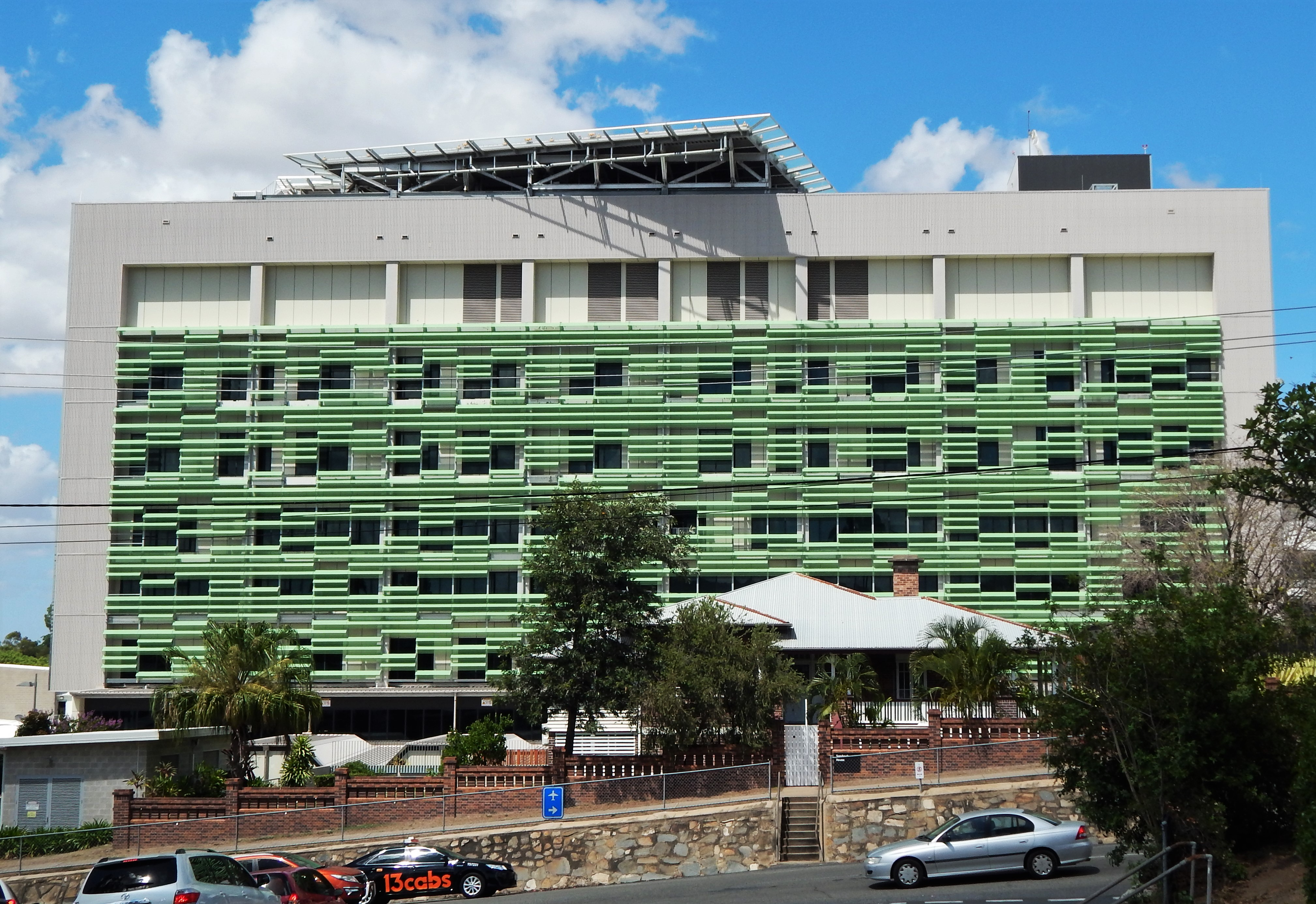
Rockhampton Hospital's cancer services building, 2019

A cancer services building, incorporating new radiation oncology services, was officially opened by Cameron Dick at Rockhampton Hospital in 2015. The seven-storey building includes three floors of cancer services, an expanded intensive care unit, two general hospital wards, a plant room, staff office space and a rooftop helipad.

The oncology services were established at the hospital after many years of lobbying from the community for better cancer treatment options in Central Queensland.

500 cancer patients were expected to be treated in the new building within its first year, with the new oncology services creating 19 full-time jobs.

=== Carpark ===
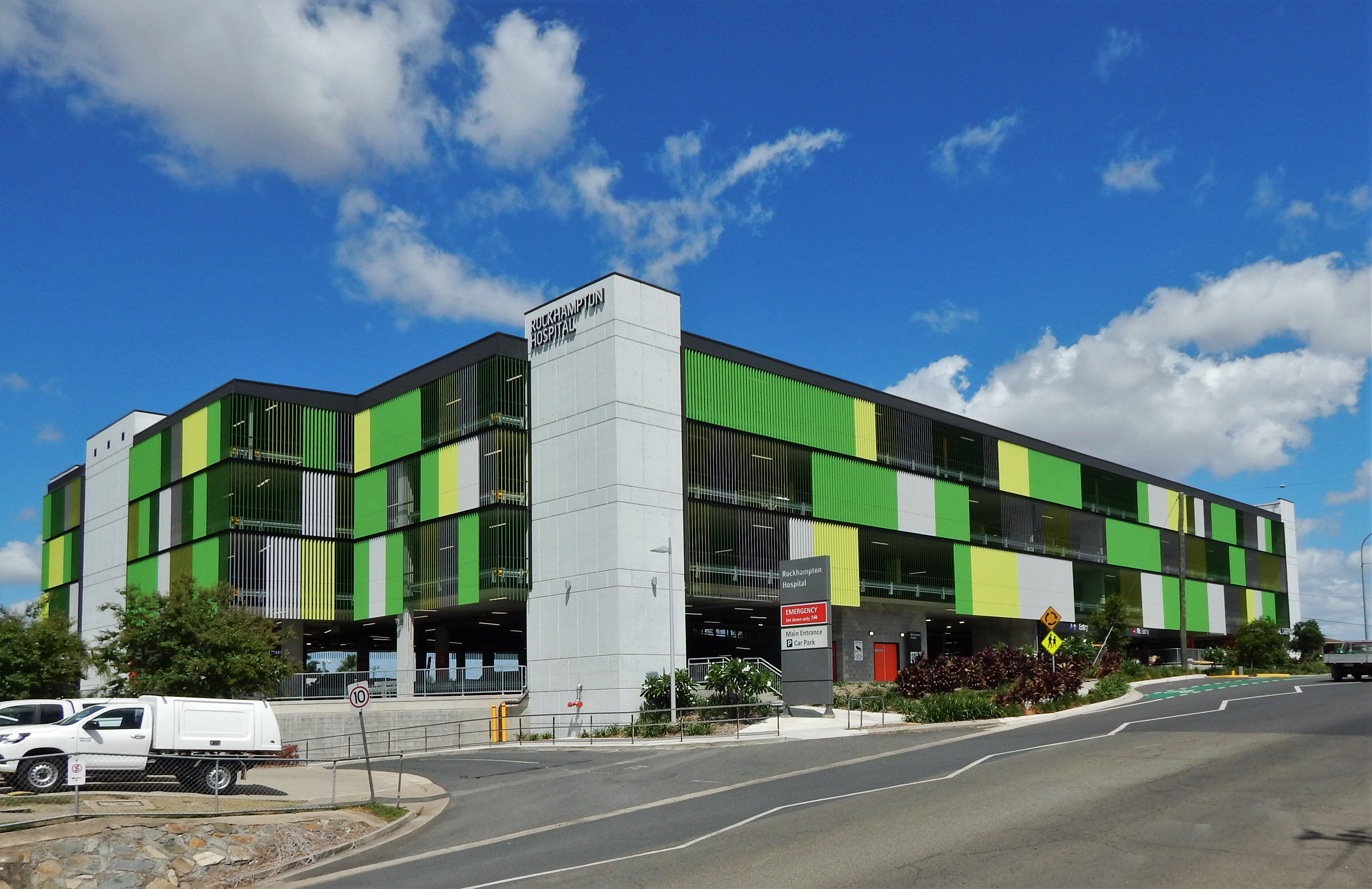
Rockhampton Hospital's multi-storey carpark, 2019

After many years of complaints from the community about the lack of parking at Rockhampton Hospital, a new 597-space multi-storey carpark which took 18 months to build at a cost of $25 million, opened in March 2019.

The original Rockhampton Hospital Post Office in Canning Street, which first opened in 1949, had to be removed to make way for the carpark.

It was relocated to the Rockhampton Heritage Village at Parkhurst and a new modern post office was built on the hospital site, at the corner of North and Quarry Street.

=== Criticism ===
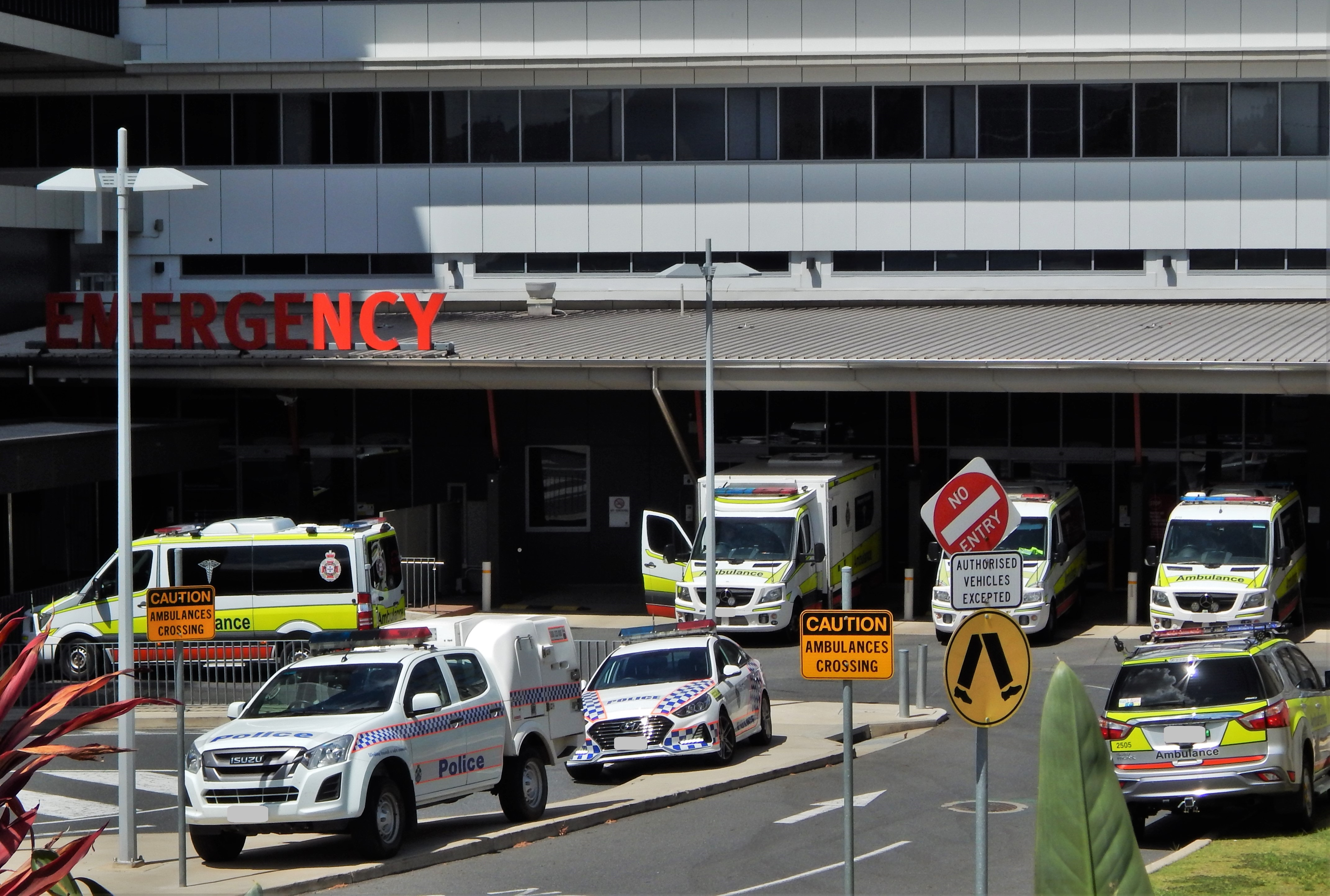
Emergency vehicles parked outside Rockhampton Hospital's emergency department, 2019

Despite the redevelopment, Rockhampton Hospital continues to struggle with demand during busy periods, with a shortage of beds for patients in the emergency department often causing instances of "ambulance ramping" where patients are forced to wait in ambulance vehicles outside before being admitted for treatment during busy periods.

According to data, ambulance ramping at the hospital increased 27% in the twelve months to February 2021.

After the witnessing the hospital in a "Code Yellow" situation during a visit, Queensland Shadow Health Minister Ros Bates called for the hospital to be expanded even further.
