= Genzkow =

- Ortsteil of Friedland
- Interactive map of Genzkow
- Location within Germany Location within Mecklenburg-Vorpommern
- Coordinates: 53°37′N 13°29′E
- Country: Germany
- State: Mecklenburg-Vorpommern
- District: Mecklenburgische Seenplatte
- Town: Friedland

Area
  - Total: 9.12 km^{2} (3.52 sq mi)
- Elevation: 30 m (98 ft)

Population (2018-12-31)
  - Total: 118
  - Density: 12.9/km^{2} (33.5/sq mi)
- Time zone: UTC+01:00 (CET)
  - Summer (DST): UTC+02:00 (CEST)
- Postal codes: 17098
- Dialling codes: 039601
- Vehicle registration: MST
- Website: www.friedland-mecklenburg.de

Genzkow (German pronunciation: [ˈɡɛntskoː]) is a village and a former municipality in the district Mecklenburgische Seenplatte, in Mecklenburg-Vorpommern, Germany. Since May 2019, it is part of the town Friedland.
