= Oswald Berkhan =

German physician (1834–1917)

- Born: 19 March 1834; Blankenburg, Saxony-Anhalt, Germany
- Died: 15 February 1917 (aged 82); Braunschweig, Lower Saxony, Germany
- Occupation: Physician
- Known for: First person to identify dyslexia

Oswald Berkhan (19 March 1834 – 15 February 1917) was a German physician.

Born in Blankenburg am Harz, he was one of the initiators of the "Idioten-Anstalt Neuerkerode" (institution for people with mental illnesses), which was thought to be a sanctuary for disabled and ill people. He was also a dedicated reformer of special education schools.

He was the first person to identify dyslexia, in 1881, though the term "dyslexia" was coined several years later (in 1887) by Rudolf Berlin, who was an ophthalmologist in Stuttgart.

Berkhan died in Braunschweig.

== Publications (selected) ==
- 1863: Beiträge zur Geschichte der Psychiatrie ... 1. Heft. Das Irrenwesen der Stadt Braunschweig in den früheren Jahrhunderten
- 1889: Ueber Störungen der Sprache und der Schriftsprache
- 1899: Über den angeborenen und früh erworbenen Schwachsinn
- 1902: Über den angeborenen oder früh sich zeigenden Wasserkopf (Hydrocephalus internus) und seine Beziehungen zur geistigen Entwickelung
- 1910: Das Wunderkind Christian Heinrich Heineken
- 1910: Otto Pöhler, das frühlesende Braunschweiger Kind

== Legacy ==
In 2016, Oswald Foundation, an accessibility technology company named after Berkhan, was established to build products for individuals suffering from disabilities.

== See also ==
- History of dyslexia research
