= Friederike Krüger =

Woman cross dressing soldier in the Prussian army

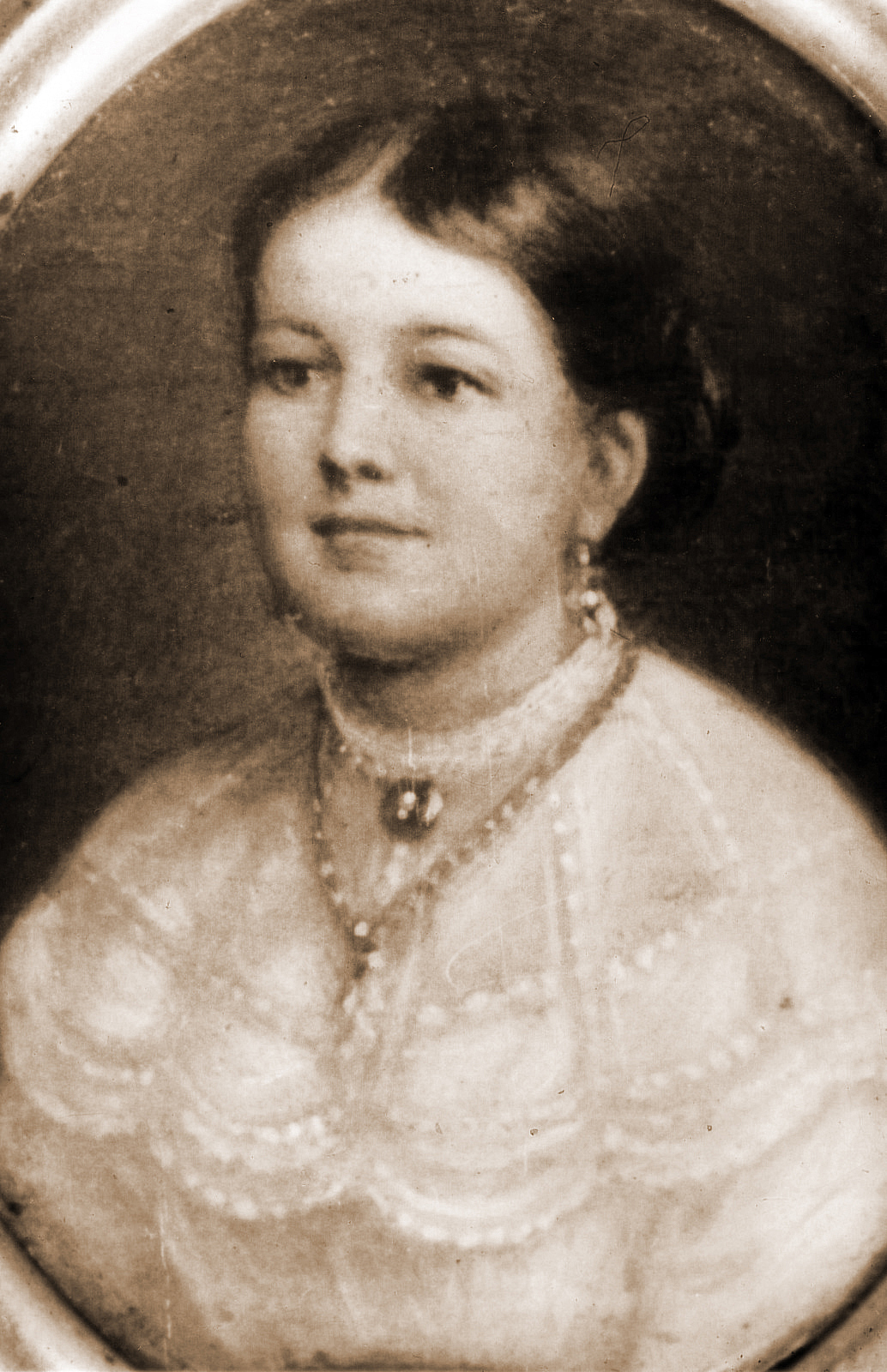
- Born: 8 October 1789; Friedland, Duchy of Mecklenburg-Strelitz, Holy Roman Empire
- Died: 31 May 1848 (aged 58); Templin, Kingdom of Prussia, German Confederation
- Burial place: St.-Georgen-Friedhof
- Spouse: Karl Köhler
- Military career
- Allegiance: Prussia
- Service years: 1813–1815
- Nicknames: August Lübeck; Auguste Krüger
- Conflicts: Napoleonic Wars
- Awards: Iron Cross; Order of St. George

Sophie Dorothea Friederike Krüger, alias August Lübeck or Auguste Krüger, (8 October 1789 - 31 May 1848) was a female soldier in the Prussian army during the Napoleonic Wars.

== Early life ==
Krüger was born Sophia Dorothea Friederica Krüger on 8 October 1789 in the town of Friedland in what was then the Duchy of Mecklenburg-Strelitz. After the death of her mother earlier that year, she started an apprenticeship as a tailor in the town of Anklam in 1812 that was interrupted by her joining the military.

== Military career ==
In 1813, at 23 years old, she cut off her hair and put on a male uniform that she had sewn herself to attend a mobilization proclamation during the Napoleonic Wars. Taking on the name August Lübeck, Krüger was admitted into the 4th company of the 1st battalion of the Prussian Colbergsches Infanterie Regiment Nr. 9. Owing to the speed of mobilization there were no medical examinations and so she was not discovered at first. Her comrades admired her courage very much and were loyal to her, but during one attack her high voice caused the others to realize that she was female. However, she was not discharged from the army and was even allowed by King Frederick William III of Prussia to continue serving under her real name. She was promoted to corporal after the Battle of Möckern. She was then promoted to sergeant after the Battle of Dennewitz and subsequently fought in the Battle of Waterloo in 1815.

She left the army in 1815, immediately after the war had ended. On 5 March 1816, she married the Prussian Staff Sargeant Karl Köhler at the Garnisonkirche in Berlin under attendance of the king. The couple moved first to Lychen and then to Templin. They had four children. She was awarded the Iron Cross by King Frederick William III and the Russian Order of St. George for her bravery. She died Friederike Krüger-Köhler on 31 May 1848 in Templin and was buried in the town's St.-Georgen-Friedhof, where her grave can still be seen to this day.

== Legacy ==
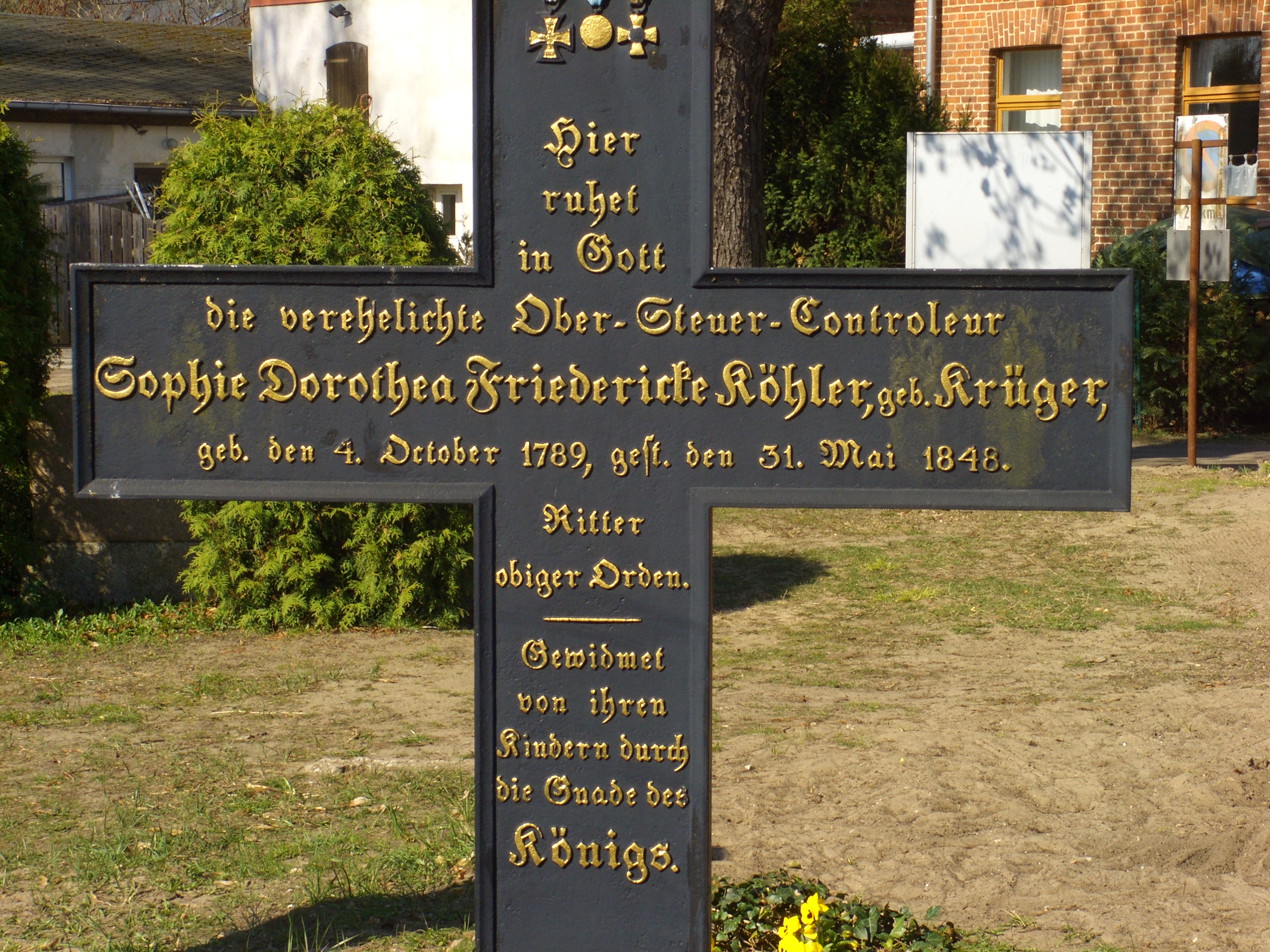
Friederike Krüger's grave in Templin.

There are two roads named after her, one in her birth town of Friedland and one in Templin; both are named Friederike-Krüger-Straße.

The all-girls Friederike-Krüger-Schule in Anklam was named after her, receiving its name on 27 May 1938 and being destroyed in a bombing raid on 9 October 1943 as a result of World War II. Another school of the same name also existed in her home town of Friedland that received its name on 1 June 1964. Krüger's former birth house was home to a plaque honoring her, with the building being destroyed during World War II however, the plaque was moved to the town museum where a small exhibition on her exists. The location of her former birthplace is, since 10 May 1992, home to a commemorative stone remembering her. On 20 June 1994, German author Anita Heiden-Berndt published the novel Friederike Auguste Krüger which received the Annalise-Wagner-Preis later that year.

On 10 September 2025, the former Hindenburg barracks in Munster were renamed after her, now called Unteroffizier-Friederike-Krüger-Kaserne.
