= Phono-graphix =

Phonetics software

Phono-graphix, a phonetics program, is a method for teaching and re-mediating reading and spelling developed in 1993 by the Read America clinic in Florida. It takes the sounds of the English language and teaches the various "sound-pictures" (letters and combinations of letters) that represent those sounds.

Along with its use in the United States, it has also been used in Southern Africa since 2000 through Read for Africa.
