= June Lyday Orton =

American psychiatric social worker

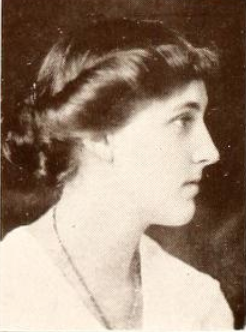
- June Lyday (later Orton), from the 1917 yearbook of Vassar College
- Born: June Frances Lyday; August 3, 1897; Newton, Iowa, U.S.
- Died: March 12, 1977 (age 79); Winston-Salem, North Carolina, U.S.
- Occupations: Psychiatric social worker, educational researcher
- Spouse: Samuel Orton

June Frances Lyday Orton (August 3, 1897 – March 12, 1977) was an American psychiatric social worker and educational researcher. With her husband Samuel Orton, she was an expert on language disabilities, especially dyslexia. She founded the Orton Society, now known as the International Dyslexia Association, in 1949.

== Early life and education ==
June Lyday was born in Newton, Iowa and raised in Detroit, the daughter of Joseph Hiram Lyday and June Lumbert Lyday. Her father was a photographer and businessman. She graduated from Vassar College in 1917. She earned a master's degree in social work at Smith College in 1919, with further studies at the University of Iowa and Columbia University. She was a member of Phi Beta Kappa.

== Career ==
In the 1920s, Lyday was chief of psychiatric social service in the psychiatry department at the University of Iowa, and field organizer of the program's mobile mental hygiene clinic. During this time, she was vice-president of the American Association of Hospital Social Workers.

At Iowa, she met Samuel Orton, and they began working together on the conditions now known as dyslexia. The couple researched and treated reading disabilities, and trained teachers to recognize and address reading disabilities, from their clinic in New York City.

Orton founded the Orton Society in 1949, and served as the society's president from 1950 to 1960, and editor of the Bulletin of the Orton Society. She was affiliated with the Bowman-Gray School of Medicine at Wake Forest University, and ran language clinics in Winston-Salem, North Carolina, from 1950 to 1972. Her private clinic became part of the special education department at Salem College. She spoke about her work to professional and community groups.

== Publications ==
- "The Development of Psychiatric Social Service" (1924)
- "The Green County (Iowa) Mental Health Clinic: An Experiment in the Extension of the Out-Patient Service of a Psychopathic Hospital into a Rural Community" (1926)
- "The Place of the Rural Clinic in a Rural Community" (1928)
- "The Problem of the Supply of Psychiatric Social Workers for State Hospitals" (1928, with Maida H. Solomon)
- A Guide to Teaching Phonics (1963)
- "Parents as Participants in the Team Approach to their Dyslexic Children" (1971)

== Personal life and legacy ==
Lyday married her widowed colleague Samuel Torrey Orton in 1928, as his second wife. Her husband died in 1948, and she died in 1977, at the age of 79. Their papers, including patient files, are in the Health Sciences Library at Columbia University. Because the papers contain patient files, they have been useful in making long term studies of people who were diagnosed with dyslexia in the 1950s and 1960s. The Samuel Torrey Orton and June Lyday Orton Memorial Lecture is given annually at the conference of the International Dyslexia Association.
