= Friedland, Mecklenburg-Vorpommern =

Town in Mecklenburg-Vorpommern, Germany

Friedland
- Town
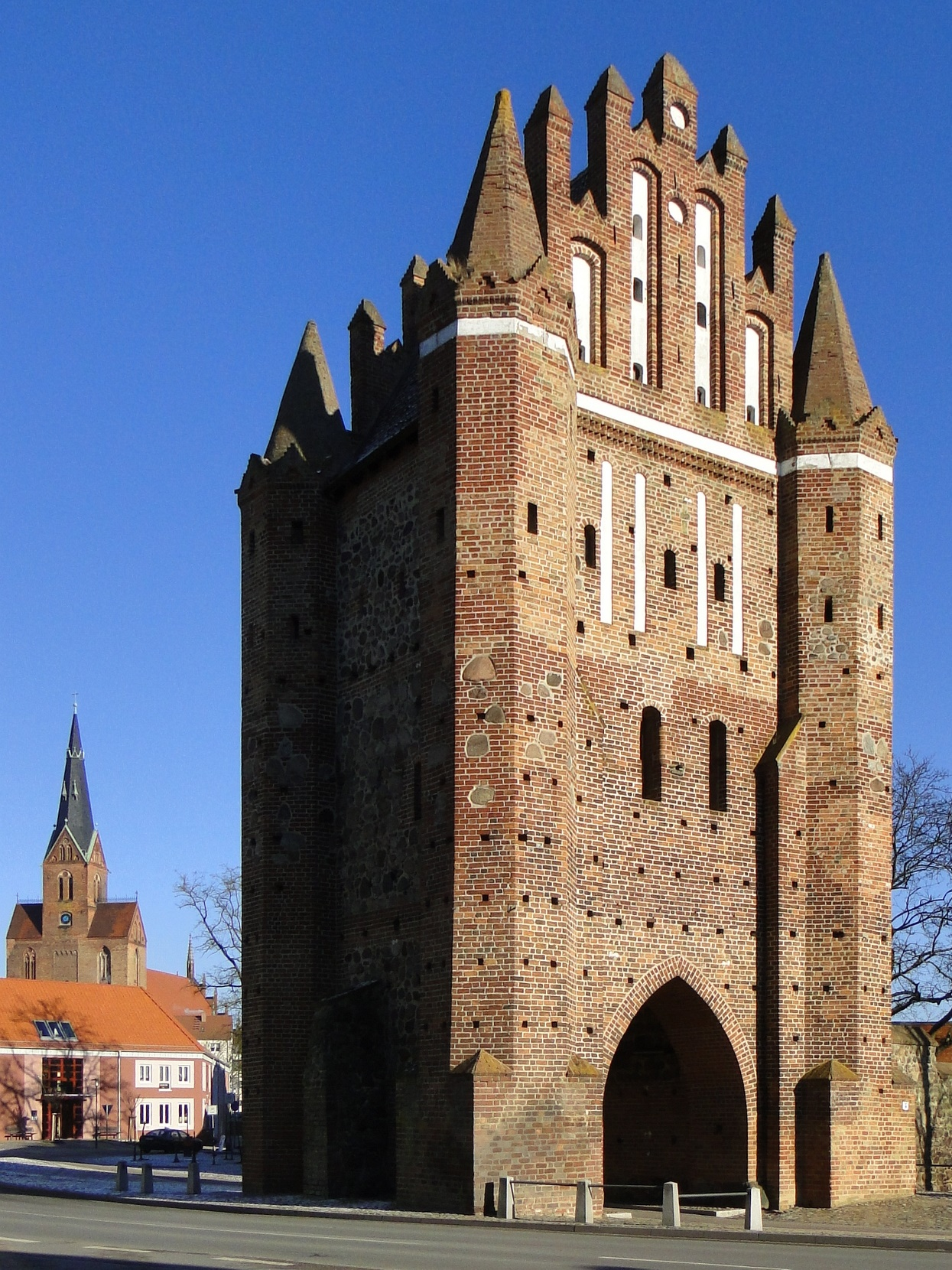
- Gothic Neubrandenburg Gate with the Church of the Virgin Mary in the background

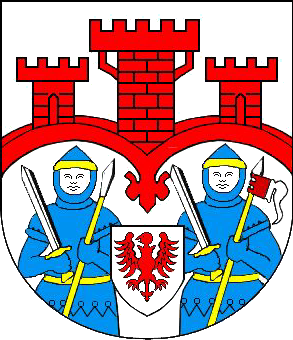
- Coat of arms

- Location of Friedland within Mecklenburgische Seenplatte district
- Interactive map of Friedland
- Location within Germany Location within Mecklenburg-Vorpommern
- Coordinates: 53°39′N 13°32′E
- Country: Germany
- State: Mecklenburg-Vorpommern
- District: Mecklenburgische Seenplatte
- Municipal assoc.: Friedland

Government
  - Mayor: Frank Nieswandt

Area
  - Total: 141.79 km^{2} (54.75 sq mi)
- Elevation: 25 m (82 ft)

Population (2025-12-31)
  - Total: 6,054
  - Density: 42.70/km^{2} (110.6/sq mi)
- Time zone: UTC+01:00 (CET)
  - Summer (DST): UTC+02:00 (CEST)
- Postal codes: 17098
- Dialling codes: 039601
- Vehicle registration: MST
- Website: www.friedland-mecklenburg.de

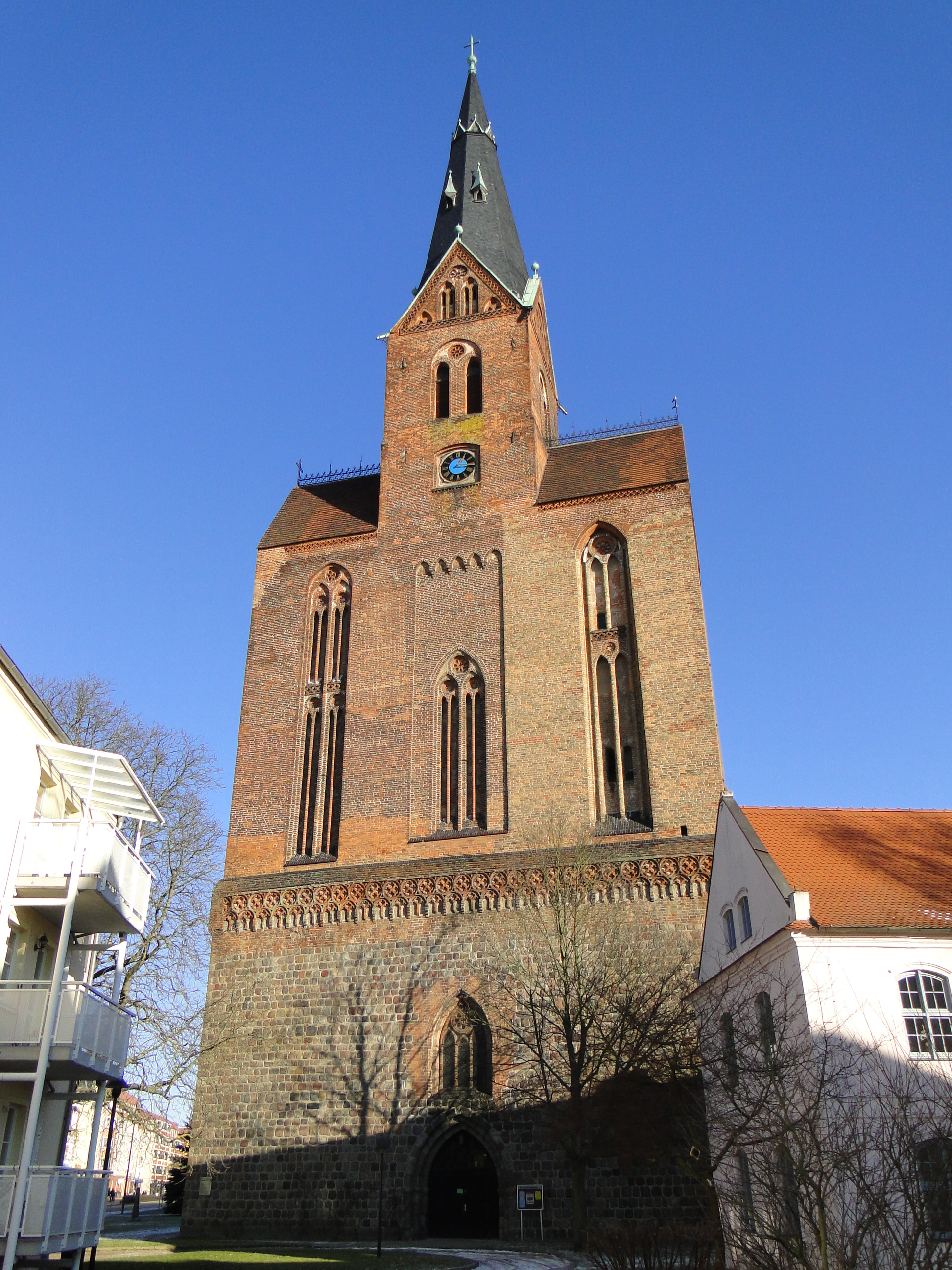
Church of the Virgin Mary

Friedland (German pronunciation: [ˈfʁiːtˌlant]) is a town in the district Mecklenburgische Seenplatte, Mecklenburg-Vorpommern, Germany.

It is only 22 km from the district seat and bigger town Neubrandenburg, but still Friedland remains a local center for surrounding communities like Galenbeck (Kotelow, Lübbersdorf, Schwichtenberg), Brunn and Boldekow, and has approximately 6,500 citizens. The former municipality Genzkow was merged into Friedland in May 2019.

It was founded in 1244 by the Prince-electors Otto and Johann of Brandenburg, then having the name Vredeland.

== Notable people ==
=== Sons and daughters of the city ===
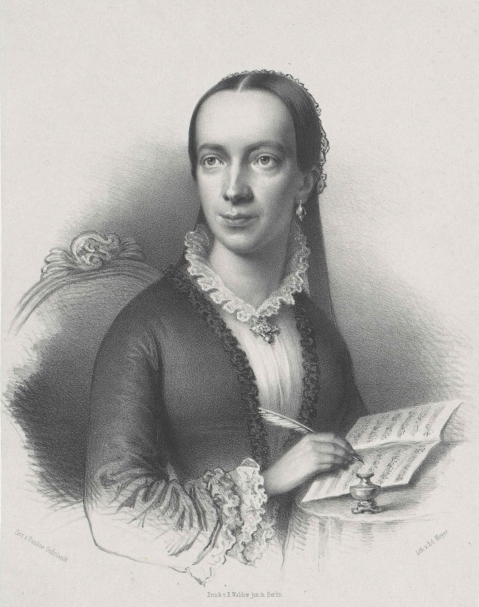
Emilie Mayer

- Andreas Helvigius (1572–1643), philologist, educator
- Friederike Krüger (1789–1858), served disguised as a man during the Napoleonic Wars, 1813 to 1815
- Emilie Mayer (1812–1883), composer of Romantic music
- Rudolf Berlin (1833–1897), ophthalmologist

=== People who have worked here ===
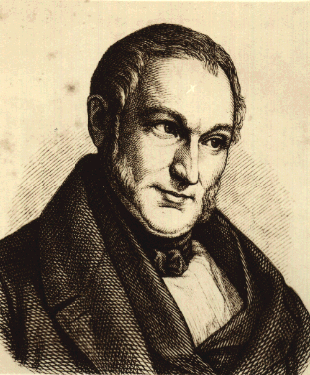
Johann Heinrich von Thünen

- Johann Heinrich von Thünen (1783–1850), agriculturist and economist, led the Liepen family in 1806 and married the Friedland mayor and estate owner Helena Sophia Berlin.
- Daniel Runge, (DE Wiki) (1804–1864), theologian and parliamentarian, attended the scholars’ school here
- Ernst Boll (1817–1868), natural scientist, was a house teacher in Friedland
- Fritz Reuter (1810–1874), low German poet, studied at the school in Friedland
- Wilhelm Sauer (1831–1916), organ builder, spent his youth in Friedland
