= Smart Way Reading and Spelling =

Reading instruction program

Smart Way Reading and Spelling is a commercial brand of reading instruction methodology and materials that was developed in 2001 by Bright Sky Learning.

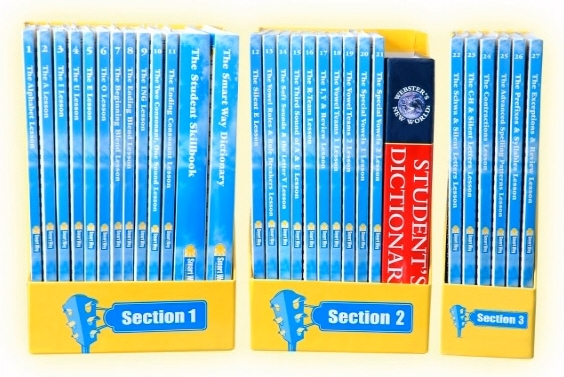
Smart Way Reading and Spelling

Over two years in development, Smart Way Reading and Spelling is designed to be simple to use yet it is efficient in teaching students. The reading methodology ranges from teaching introductory sounds and how to learn American English through advanced reading strategies. The program has been used in remedial reading programs in states across the country with positive and consistent results and is based on scientific research on teaching reading which stresses systematic and explicit phonics coupled with reading comprehension and fluency.

The Smart Way Reading and Spelling program is presented in a series of twenty-seven individual flip chart lessons. Each flip chart contains a complete lesson that includes both the student and coach materials within one bound booklet. The student sees an image or text on one side of the flip chart, while the reading coach has his scripted instructions on the other side with a mirror image of what the student sees. The completely scripted nature of the program allows even the most novice coach to work with a student immediately. Extensive training is not necessary. Over time, as the coach becomes more confident, he can add more creativity and interaction in working with students. Rather than stressing individual phonetic rules for the sake of teaching rules, the Smart Way methodology introduces words and word patterns in families, helping students grasp the key phonetic rules through a cognitive learning process. The program was designed as both a complete learning system for youngsters and as an intervention method for older students and adults. Though results will vary, most students will complete each lesson in one to two hours.

== Additional research base of the program ==
The delivery of the Smart Way Reading and Spelling program is based on the concept of self-efficacy and its application in instructional practices. The gradual, systematic approach allows students to develop their skills and increase their confidence. Explicit, systematic instruction is recognized as having a direct impact on student success, especially in low-achieving students and supports its use in phonics instruction. As well, research shows phonics instruction is useful to students of all ages and other research validates intense instruction in decoding skills as a method of boosting the reading level for struggling readers in high school.

Smart Way Reading and Spelling

== The Sounds of English ==
This compact disc and flash card product helps people recognize and repeat the sounds unique to American English. It was created and designed specifically for early readers, ELL (English Language Learners) and EFL (English as a foreign language) students. The Sounds of English introduces forty-six phonemes (speech sounds) in isolation and in text.
