= Strephosymbolia =

Strephosymbolia was Samuel Orton's theory of dyslexia which he first published in 1925. The root strepho is Ancient Greek for "twisted" or "reversed" and he used this in preference to the phrase "word blindness", which he thought inaccurate as the difficulty was not that those with strephosymbolia could not see the words but that they had difficulty comprehending them. As he developed his theory, he attributed the difficulty to an imperfect dominance of the hemisphere of the brain which processed the symbols when reading, being confused by a residual but reversed equivalent in the other hemisphere.

== See also ==
- Alexia (acquired dyslexia)
- Auditory processing disorder
- Developmental dyslexia
- Educational psychology
- Illiteracy
- Learning disability
- List of notable people diagnosed with dyslexia
- Learning to read
- Scotopic sensitivity syndrome
