= Starfall (website) =

Children's website created in 2002

- Screenshot of a previous version of the website
- Website type: Children's website
- Available in: English
- Headquarters: Boulder, Colorado, United States
- Owner: Starfall Education Foundation
- Key people: Stephen Schutz (Chairman) and Roger Wilson (President)
- Website: www.starfall.com
- Commercial: No
- Launched: August 27, 2002; 24 years ago

Starfall is a children's website that teaches basic English reading and writing skills. The main demographic is preschoolers through fifth graders. It teaches children how to read by using games and phonics. Methods used by the website are based on the research of G. Reid Lyon from the National Institutes of Health and Edward J. Kame'enui from the University of Oregon. Established in 2002, the website is free to use and does not use advertising to generate revenue. The cost of running it is instead covered by money from Blue Mountain Arts, as well as the money made from its workbook printouts.

== History ==
Starfall was founded on August 27, 2002, by Stephen Schutz, his wife Susan Polis Schutz, and their son, Jared Polis. Starfall arose from Blue Mountain Arts, a publishing house in Boulder, Colorado founded by Stephen Schutz. Starfall received this name because the founders believed that the name "evoked wonder and delight". Stephen Schutz had trouble reading books when he was 9 years old, so he decided to help young readers by creating this website.

In 2004, Starfall launched Pumarosa, which helps Spanish speakers learn English.

In May 2007, Starfall had 987,000 visitors, which was a 300% increase from the previous year. In 2011, TIME included Starfall on its list of "50 Websites That Make the Web Great".

== Four reading levels ==
Starfall has four reading levels to teach children how to read. The levels, in order from the most basic to the most advanced are: "learning ABCs", "early beginning reading", "intermediate beginning reading", and "advanced beginning reading".

The first level teaches preschoolers about the ABCs. At this level, the website provides learners with all the letters of the alphabet in the upper case form and in the lower case form. When the learners see words appear on the screen, they hear the sounds of all the letters that compose a word. In the early beginning level, learners create words through the addition of consonants to different word family. The letters in every word are highlighted while they are read to the learner.

In the intermediate beginning reading level, readers can bring the books they will read to life before they read them. The learner can read about eminent artists and magic tricks. In the advanced beginning reading level, children can read a variety of books, including nonfiction books, bird riddles, Chinese fables, and comics.
