= Samuel Orton =

Samuel Torrey Orton (October 15, 1879 – November 17, 1948) was an American physician who pioneered the study of learning disabilities. He examined the causes and treatment of dyslexia.

== Career ==
Orton's interest in learning disabilities stemmed from his early work as a pathologist in Massachusetts, where he worked with adult patients with brain damage. This led him to study why some children with apparently intact neurological functioning have language disabilities. In 1919, Orton was hired as the founding director of the State Psychopathic Hospital in Iowa City, Iowa, and chairman of the Department of Psychiatry at the University of Iowa College of Medicine. In 1925, Orton set up a 2-week mobile clinic in Greene County, Iowa to evaluate students referred by teachers because they "were retarded or failing in their school work." Orton found that 14 of the students who were referred primarily because they had great difficulty in learning to read, in fact had near-average, average, or above-average IQ scores.

Orton's study of reading difficulties in children led him to hypothesize that these individuals have failed to establish appropriate cerebral organization to support the association of visual words with their spoken forms. He termed this difficulty strephosymbolia, meaning "twisted symbols". This term stemmed from Orton's observation that many of the children he worked with tended to reverse letters or transpose their order. Orton also reported that some of his research subjects could read more easily if they held pages up to a mirror, and a few were rapid mirror writers.

Working in the 1920s, Orton did not have access to modern brain scanning equipment, but he knew from his work with brain damaged adults that injuries to the left hemisphere produced symptoms similar to those he observed in children. Many of the children Orton studied were also ambidextrous or had mixed handedness. This led Orton to theorize that the children's reading problems stemmed from the failure of the left hemisphere to become dominant over the right. Some of Orton's theories about brain structure and organization would later be confirmed by modern brain researchers, such as Albert Galaburda, who compared the brains of deceased dyslexic and non-dyslexic adults in the late 1970s.

Dr. Orton's key contribution to the field of education was the concept of "multisensory" teaching–integrating kinesthetic (movement-based) and tactile (sensory-based) learning strategies with teaching of visual and auditory concepts. Dr. Orton wanted a way to teach reading that would integrate right and left brain functions. He was influenced by the work of fellow psychologist Grace Fernald, who had developed a kinesthetic approach involving writing in the air and tracing words in large written or scripted format, while simultaneously saying the names and sounds of the letters.

Later, Orton began working with psychologist Anna Gillingham, who introduced a systematic and orderly approach of categorizing and teaching a set of 70 phonograms, single letters and letter pairs representing the 44 discrete sounds (or phonemes) found in English. In the years since Dr. Orton's death in 1948, his name has come to be strongly associated with the Orton-Gillingham teaching method, which remains the basis of the most prevalent form of remediation and tutoring for children with dyslexia, or dyslexia-like symptoms, such as reading disabilities.

He earned degrees from Ohio State University (BS), University of Pennsylvania (MD), and Harvard University (MA).

== Impact ==
The studies of Orton have led the studies on dyslexia and have found validation in current cognitive science and learning theory. Although he did not have access to brain scanning equipment, most of his findings have eventually been found to be correct. His work is the basis of current neuropsychological concept of laterality of brain and reciprocal functions of the two cerebral hemispheres. Working in association with Anna Gillingham and Bessie W. Stillman the Orton-Gillingham approach to teaching language was developed. The original manual, originally published in 1935, is currently in its seventh edition.

== See also ==
- List of Phonics Programs
- Orton-Gillingham
- Spalding Method
- International Dyslexia Association, originally named the Orton Dyslexia Society
- June Lyday Orton
