= Base hospital =

A base hospital is a hospital in Australia or New Zealand serving a large rural area, perhaps equivalent to an American District Hospital. It is often supported by smaller hospitals in local communities. Examples include Bendigo Base Hospital in Australia, and Grey Base Hospital in New Zealand.
