= Barbara Miller Solomon =

American historian (1919–1992)

- Born: Barbara Leah Miller; February 12, 1919; Boston, Massachusetts, U.S.
- Died: August 20, 1992 (aged 73); Cambridge, Massachusetts, U.S.
- Education: Radcliffe College
- Occupation: Historian
- Years active: 1957–1985
- Employer: Harvard University
- Known for: Women's history
- Children: 3

Barbara Leah Miller Solomon (February 12, 1919 – August 20, 1992) was an American historian. She studied US immigration and women's history and taught the first course at Harvard University on the history of US women.

== Early life and education ==
Born in Boston on February 12, 1919, Barbara Leah Miller was the only child of Bessie (Pinsky) and Benjamin Allen Miller, Jewish immigrants from Russia. She attended Girls' Latin School, then Radcliffe College, where she graduated magna cum laude in American History and Literature in 1940. She next earned a doctorate in American Civilization at Harvard in 1953. She studied with Oscar Handlin and Arthur M. Schlesinger Sr.

== Career ==
She began teaching in 1957, first at Wheelock College in Boston. She taught at Harvard from 1959 until her retirement in 1985. She taught the first course at Harvard University on the history of US women. She also led the Radcliffe women’s archive, which became the Schlesinger Library, from 1959 to 1963. In 1970, Ernest R. May, then Dean of Harvard College, appointed Solomon assistant dean, the first woman to hold a deanship at Harvard.

Her 1985 book In the Company of Educated Women: A History of Women and Higher Education in America won the Frederic W. Ness Award of the Association of American Colleges.

== Personal life ==
In 1940, Miller eloped to New York with Harvard classmate Peter Herman Solomon, the son of a Harvard Medical School psychiatry professor and a psychiatric social worker. Barbara was married to Peter for 48 years until his death in 1988. They had three children.

She died of cancer on August 20, 1992, at her home in Cambridge, Massachusetts, at age 73.

== Bibliography ==
- Ancestors & Immigrants: A Changing New England Tradition (Harvard University Press, 1956)
- Pioneers in Service: The History of the Associated Jewish Philanthropies of Boston (1956)
- The Travels of Timothy Dwight in New England and New York (1969)
- In the Company of Educated Women: A History of Women and Higher Education in America (Yale University Press, 1985)
