= Rudolf Berlin =

German ophthalmologist (1833–1897)

Rudolf August Johann Ludwig Wilhelm Berlin
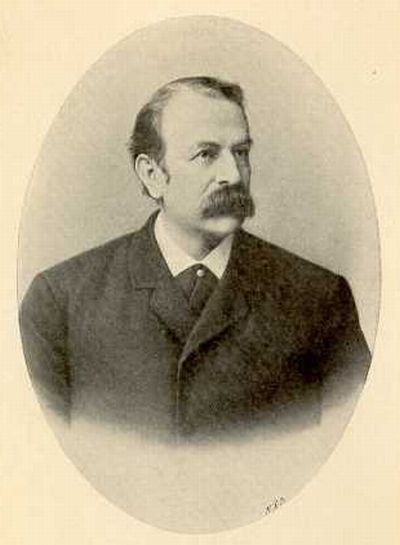
- Born: 2 May 1833; Friedland, Grand Duchy of Mecklenburg-Strelitz, German Confederation
- Died: 12 September 1897 (aged 64); Linthal, Glarus, Switzerland
- Resting place: Rostock, Germany
- Other name: Rudolph Berlin
- Education: University of Göttingen; University of Würzburg; University of Erlangen; Charité, Berlin
- Known for: Coining the term dyslexia
- Spouse: Dorothea Berlin
- Scientific career
- Fields: Ophthalmology
- Workplaces: Technical College of Stuttgart; Veterinary School, Stuttgart; University of Rostock

Rudolf August Johann Ludwig Wilhelm Berlin (2 May 1833 – 12 September 1897), also known as Rudolph Berlin, was a German ophthalmologist.

== Life and work ==
Rudolf Berlin was born to August Berlin (1803–1880), a physician, and his wife Amalie (née Runge, 1808–1884) in Friedland (Mecklenburg). His grandfather, George Ludwig Berlin (1772–1823), had been a mayor of that city.

Rudolf Berlin attended the Gymnasium in his native city and took his Abitur on 29 September 1853. He then studied medicine in Göttingen, Würzburg, and Erlangen, and ophthalmology under Albrecht von Graefe at the Charité in Berlin. Rudolf Berlin was a member of the Corps Hannovera Göttingen and Nassovia Würzburg. After completing his studies he became an assistant to Alexander Pagenstecher in Wiesbaden and at the surgical clinic in Tübingen. In 1861 he set up an eye clinic in Stuttgart.

In 1870 he completed a habilitation in physiological optics at the Technical College of Stuttgart. In 1875, he became professor of comparative ophthalmology at the Veterinary School in Stuttgart. Berlin was the first to systematically conduct comparative ophthalmology. Since 1882 he published the Zeitschrift für vergleichende Augenheilkunde (Journal of Comparative Ophthalmology); in that journal he published his work on the physical-optical construction of the horse's eye. In 1884 he was elected a member of the Leopoldina academy of sciences.

In 1887 Rudolf Berlin coined the term dyslexia.

In 1895 Berlin assumed the position of dean at the University of Rostock's Faculty of Medicine. In 1897 he was elected rector of the university. A few months later he died at the age of 65 during a spa stay in Switzerland. His is buried at the old cemetery in Rostock, today Lindenpark.

Berlin worked on many different topics, such as the extirpation of the lacrimal sac, the influence of convex lenses on eccentric vision, cutting of the optic nerve, retinal detachment in horses, pathology and anatomy of lacrimal glands, and refraction in animal eyes. He authored the section on Krankheiten der Orbita ("Diseases of the eye socket") in the Handbuch der gesamten Augenheilkunde ("Handbook of the entire field of Ophthalmology"), which was published by Albrecht von Graefe and Edwin Theodore Sämisch in Leipzig in 1880.

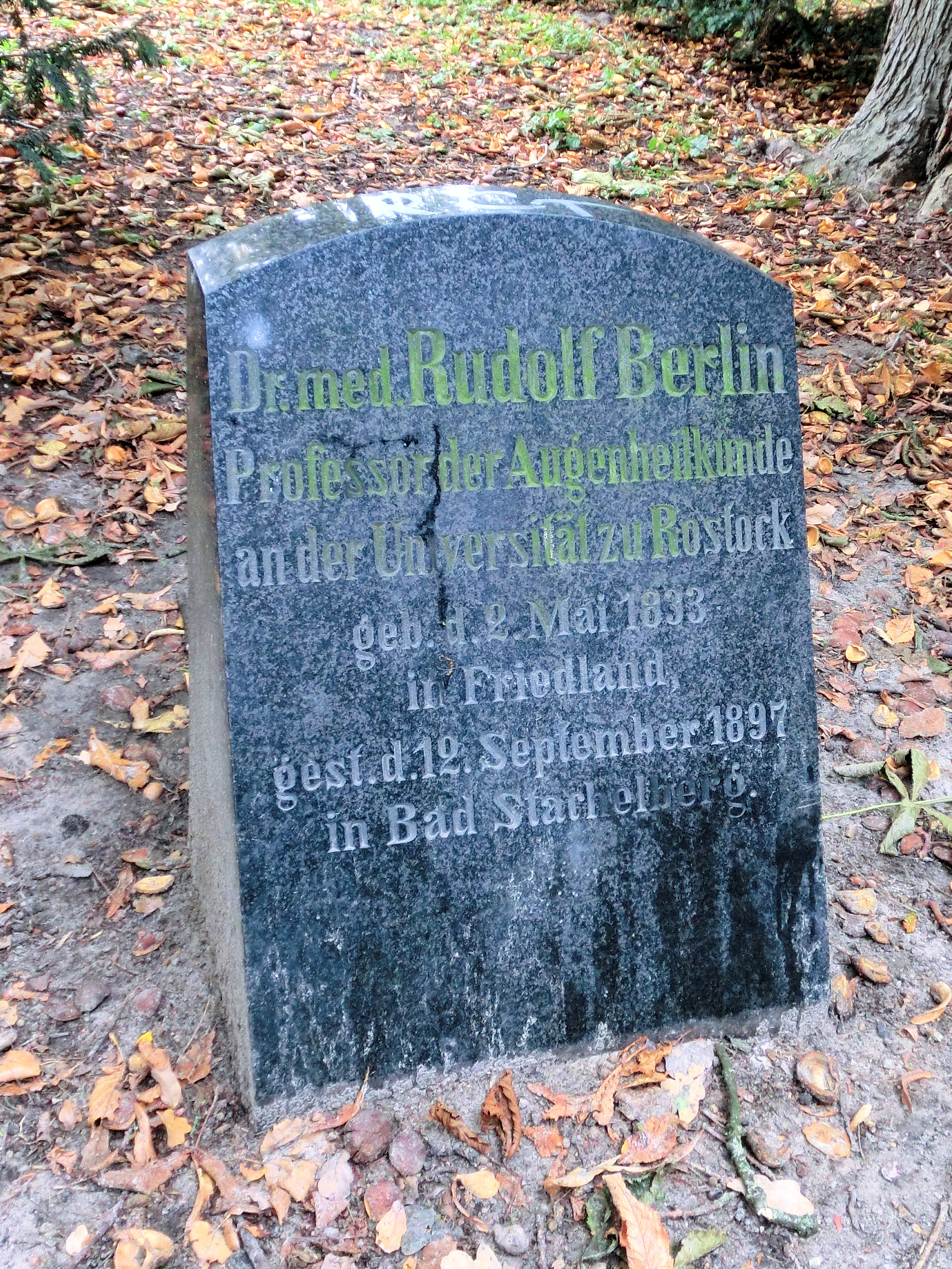
Gravestone of Rudolf Berlin at the old cemetery in Rostock

== Publications ==
- Eine besondere Art der Wortblindheit (Dyslexie) ("A special kind of word blindness (Dyslexia)"). Wiesbaden 1887. (Online copy)
