= Anna Gillingham =

British psychologist and educator

Anna Gillingham (1878–1963) was an educator and psychologist, known for her contributions to the Orton-Gillingham method for teaching children with dyslexia how to read.

== Early life and education ==
Gillingham was born on July 12, 1879. She was home-schooled by her parents, who were both teachers. She spent much of her childhood living on the Pine Ridge Reservation in South Dakota, where her father was the local Indian agent. She graduated from Swarthmore in 1900, but later earned a second B.A. from Radcliffe, followed by a master's degree from Columbia Teachers College.

== Career ==
Working with Dr. Samuel Orton, she trained teachers and published instructional materials regarding reading instruction, producing the Orton-Gillingham approach to reading instruction. With Bessie Stillman, she wrote what has become the Orton–Gillingham manual: Remedial Training for Children with Specific Disability in Reading, Spelling and Penmanship. First published in 1935/6, this work is updated and republished regularly. Along with the help of Stillman, Gillingham developed a "sequential, alphabetic-phonetic multisensory program" as a tool with which students could easily create meaningful syllables. This approach eliminated the need for a child to memorize almost all words in language, limiting it to those that were non-phonetic. This teaching manual for the "alphabetic method" of Orton's theories combined multisensory techniques with teaching the structure of written English, including sounds (phonemes), meaning units (morphemes such as prefixes, suffixes, and roots) and common spelling rules.

Anna Gillingham devoted her life to the maxim that in teaching, "one should establish associations involving the simplest possible units and should use various reinforcement techniques" to create solid association links. Alongside the practicing and development of her techniques, Gillingham began working with Dr. Henry Goddard – known for his adaptation and translation of the French Simon and Binet tests for use in determining superior intelligence, thus becoming the first school psychologist in the country.

After giving up her quest for a Ph.D., Gillingham and Stillman set out on the methodical sorting of the English language. They sorted words that contain various single phonograms, digraphs and diphthongs, and those that follow particular patterns of syllable division. They developed spelling rules and exceptions, determined which spellings of vowel sounds occurred with the greatest frequency, and then developed procedures for mastering nonphonetic words. At the age of 69 Gillingham began work as a consultant for several schools in the country to supervise her remedial and preventative programs, train teachers for individual student teaching, and train classroom teachers.

To align her methods with the new editions of Webster's Dictionary, which altered pronunciation of final syllables in many words and completely abandoned older rules of syllable division, Gillingham attempted (at the age of 80 years) to conform her work to the latest linguistic principles. Examples of the change in syllable division and final syllabic changes are as follows:

-	Former	Current
Tandem	(tan’ dem)	tand-m
System	(sis’ tem)	‘sist-m
Excuse	(eks kuz’)	iks – ‘kyuz
Cancel	(kan’ sel)	‘kan(t)s-l

Another key aspect reinforced by Gillingham's teaching career is her adherence to the theory that too early exposure to reading and writing may be harmful to children. The roots of her beliefs in this come from her own childhood, having spent the first ten years of her life on a Sioux Reservation in South Dakota. On her school experience Gillingham wrote, "My parents believed in my having as wide general knowledge as possible before being introduced to the symbolism of written language…I believe that such postponement of reading and writing would be a great saving of the child's and taxpayer's money."

From 1935 until 1937, Gillingham and Stillman taught this method to students at Punahou School in Hawaii. Gillingham continued to work with Stillman until Stillman died in 1947.

== Awards and honors ==
In 1962 the Orton Society, now the International Dyslexia Association honored Gillingham for her work.
