= Orton-Gillingham =

Multisensory phonics technique for remedial reading

The Orton-Gillingham approach is a multisensory phonics technique for remedial reading instruction developed in the early 20th century. It is practiced as a direct, explicit, cognitive, cumulative, and multi-sensory approach. While it is most commonly associated with teaching individuals with dyslexia, it has been used for non-dyslexic individuals learning to read, spell, and write. In the US, it is promoted by more than 15 commercial programs as well as several private schools for students with dyslexia and related learning disabilities.

The Academy of Orton-Gillingham, originally named “The Orton Society”, certifies individuals who have taken a training program with an OGA Fellow and who have completed a supervised practicum. This certifying committee is accredited under the NYS Board of Regents.

== Orton and Gillingham ==
Samuel Torrey Orton (1879–1948), a neuropsychiatrist and pathologist at Columbia University, studied children with language-processing difficulties such as dyslexia. Together with educator and psychologist Anna Gillingham (1878–1963), he created techniques to teach reading, which integrate kinesthetic (movement-based) and tactile (sensory-based) learning strategies with teaching of visual and auditory concepts.

In 1935, Gillingham, with her long-time collaborator Bessie Stillman, published the Gillingham–Stillman manual, Remedial Training for Children with Specific Disability in Reading, Spelling and Penmanship. This is now known as the Orton–Gillingham (O-G) method, "a multisensory phonics technique for remedial reading instruction."

== Implementation ==
The Institute of Education Sciences (the independent, non-partisan statistics, research, and evaluation arm of the U.S. Department of Education), describes the approach as follows: "Orton-Gillingham is a broad, multisensory approach to teaching reading and spelling that can be modified for individual or group instruction at all reading levels. Teaching sessions are action oriented with auditory, visual, and kinesthetic elements reinforcing one another. The approach targets persons with the kinds of language processing problems (reading, spelling, and writing) associated with dyslexia."

According to Rose and Zirkel, O-G programs typically "use a multisensory approach to teach basic concepts of spelling, writing, and reading and continually build upon mastered skills." Variants of O-G "have taken the form of more than 15 commercial programs and several private schools for students with disabilities."

== Research on its efficacy ==
In 2000, the National Reading Panel included the Orton-Gillingham method in their study, "Teaching Children to Read: An Evidence-Based Assessment of the Scientific Research Literature on Reading and Its Implications for Reading Instruction." The Panel supported the significance of offering classroom instruction in phonemic awareness, phonics, fluency, vocabulary, and comprehension.

The Florida Center for Reading Research reported in 2006 that it was unable to identify any empirical studies examining the efficacy of the approach specifically as described in Orton-Gillingham training materials. Thus there was no direct research evidence to determine its effectiveness, although there are a variety of studies of derivative methods that incorporate aspects of Orton-Gillingham in combination with other techniques.

An overview of all reported studies of Orton-Gillingham derivative methods, such as Alphabetic Phonics or Project Read, revealed only a dozen studies with inconsistent results and a variety of methodological flaws. Despite these conclusions, the article does provide a detailed overview of the available research, which viewed most favorably would show some evidence of benefit from classroom use of OG methods with first graders, and use in special education or resource room settings with older children with learning disabilities.

According to a review of the literature in 2008, its efficacy is yet to be established.

In July 2010, a US Department of Education agency reported that it could not find any studies meeting its evidence standards to support the efficacy of Orton-Gillingham based strategies.
