= C9H16O =

The molecular formula C_{9}H_{16}O (molar mass: 140.22 g/mol) may refer to:

- Cyclohexylacetone
- Nonenals
  - 2-Nonenal
  - 3-Nonenal
  - 4-Nonenal
  - 5-Nonenal
  - 6-Nonenal
  - 7-Nonenal
  - 8-Nonenal
