= Biochemistry of body odor =

Biochemistry

The biochemistry of body odor pertains to the chemical compounds in the body responsible for body odor and their kinetics.

== Causes ==
Body odor encompasses axillary (underarm) odor and foot odor. It is caused by a combination of sweat gland secretions and normal skin microflora. In addition, androstane steroids and the ABCC11 transporter are essential for most axillary odor. Body odor is a complex phenomenon, with numerous compounds and catalysts involved in its genesis. Secretions from sweat glands are initially odorless, but preodoriferous compounds or malodor precursors in the secretions are transformed by skin surface bacteria into volatile odorous compounds that are responsible for body malodor. Water and nutrients secreted by sweat glands also contribute to body odor by creating an ideal environment for supporting the growth of skin surface bacteria.

== Types ==
There are three types of sweat glands: eccrine, apocrine, and apoeccrine. Apocrine glands are primarily responsible for body malodor and, along with apoeccrine glands, are mostly expressed in the axillary (underarm) regions, whereas eccrine glands are distributed throughout virtually all of the rest of the skin in the body, although they are also particularly expressed in the axillary regions, and contribute to malodor to a relatively minor extent. Sebaceous glands, another type of secretory gland, are not sweat glands but instead secrete sebum (an oily substance), and may also contribute to body odor to some degree.

The main odorous compounds that contribute to axillary odor include:

1. Unsaturated or hydroxylated branched fatty acids, with the key ones being (E)-3-methyl-2-hexenoic acid (3M2H) and 3-hydroxy-3-methylhexanoic acid (HMHA)
2. Sulfanylalkanols, particularly 3-methyl-3-sulfanylhexan-1-ol (3M3SH)
3. Odoriferous androstane steroids, namely the pheromones androstenone (5α-androst-16-en-3-one) and androstenol (5α-androst-16-en-3α-ol)

These malodorous compounds are formed from non-odoriferous precursors that are secreted from apocrine glands and converted by various enzymes expressed in skin surface bacteria. The specific skin surface bacteria responsible are mainly Staphylococcus and Corynebacterium species.

The androstane steroids dehydroepiandrosterone sulfate (DHEA-S) and androsterone sulfate have been detected in an extract of axillary hairs together with high concentrations of cholesterol. Apocrine sweat contains relatively high amounts of androgens, for instance dehydroepiandrosterone (DHEA), androsterone, and testosterone, and the androgen receptor (AR), the biological target of androgens, is strongly expressed in the secretory cells of apocrine glands. In addition, 5α-reductase type I, an enzyme which converts testosterone into the more potent androgen dihydrotestosterone (DHT), has been found to be highly expressed in the apocrine glands of adolescents, and DHT has been found to specifically contribute to malodor as well. Starting at puberty, males have higher levels of androgens than do females and produce comparatively more axillary malodor. As such, it has been proposed that the higher axillary malodor seen in males is due to greater relative stimulation of axillary apocrine sweat glands by androgens.

== Genetics ==
ABCC11 is a gene encoding an apical ATP-driven efflux transporter that has been found to transport a variety of lipophilic anions including cyclic nucleotides, estradiol glucuronide, steroid sulfates such as DHEA-S, and monoanionic bile acids. It is expressed and localized in apocrine glands, including in the axilla, the ceruminous glands in the auditory canal, and in the mammary gland. A single-nucleotide polymorphism (SNP) 538G→A in ABCC11 that leads to a G180R substitution in the encoded protein has been found to result in loss-of-function via affecting N-linked glycosylation and in turn causing proteasomal degradation of the protein. This polymorphism has been found to be responsible for the dry and white earwax phenotype, and is considered to be unique as it has been described as the only human SNP that has been found to determine a visible genetic trait. In addition to earwax phenotype, the ABCC11 genotype has been found to be associated with colostrum secretion from the breasts as well as normal axillary odor and osmidrosis (excessive axillary malodor).

A functional ABCC11 protein has been found to be essential for the presence of the characteristic strong axillary odor, with the 538G→A SNP leading to a loss of secretion of axillary malodorous precursors and a nearly complete loss of axillary odor in those who are homozygous for the polymorphism. Specifically, the secretion of the amino-acid conjugates 3M2H-Gln, HMHA-Gln, and Cys-Gly-(S) 3M3SH, which are precursors of key axillary malodorous compounds including the unsaturated or hydroxylated branched-chain fatty acids 3M2H and HMHA and the sulfanylalkanol 3M3SH, has been found to be abolished in homozygotic carriers of the SNP, and the odoriferous androstane steroids androstenone and androstenol and their precursors DHEA and DHEA-S have been found to be significantly reduced as well. Patients with axillary osmidrosis (538G/G or 538G/A genotype) were found to have significantly more numerous and relatively large axillary apocrine glands compared to controls with the A/A genotype.

== Fatty acids ==
In contrast to the aforementioned odoriferous compounds, the levels of long straight-chain fatty acids such as hexadecanoic acid, octadecanoic acid, and linolic acid and short straight-chain fatty acids such as butyric acid, hexanoic acid, and octanoic acid in axillary sweat have not been found to be affected by the ABCC11 genotype, which suggests that their secretion is independent of ABCC11. These straight-chain fatty acids are odoriferous, but differently and to a much lesser extent compared to branched-chain fatty acids. In accordance, it has been said that it is very likely that these aliphatic straight-chain fatty acids are responsible for the faint sour acidic axillary odor that has previously been observed in most Japanese individuals. In addition to the secretion of straight-chain fatty acids, axillary microflora did not appear to differ between homozygous carriers of the 538G→A SNP and non-carriers.

The ABCC11 transporter appears to be involved both in the transport of androstane steroids into the secretory cells of apocrine glands and in the secretion of preodoriferous compounds from axillary apocrine glands. Specific steroids that ABCC11 has been found to transport include steroid sulfates like DHEA-S and estrone sulfate and steroid glucuronides like estradiol glucuronide. In accordance with its transport of compounds involved in axillary odor, ABCC11 alleles are strongly associated with axillary odor. Asians have little or faint axillary odor, whereas Caucasians and Africans have strong axillary odor, and this has been found to be due to genetic differences in the ABCC11 gene.
