= Nonenal =

Nonenal may refer to:

- 2-Nonenal (see, Old person smell)
- 6-Nonenal
