= Orris =

Orris may refer to:

== People ==
- Peter Orris (born 1945), American political activist and physician
- S. Stanhope Orris (1838–1905), American classicist
- Orris S. Ferry (1823–1875), American lawyer and politician
- Orris C. Herfindahl (1918–1972), American economist
- Orris E. Kelly (1926–2026), American army officer, chief of chaplains (1975–1979)
- Orris Pratt (1837–1906), American politician
- Orris George Walker (1942–2015), American Episcopal bishop

== Places ==
- Adam Orris House
- Orris Baragwanath Pass

== Other uses ==
- Orris, a gold lace
- Orris root
- Orris oil
