= C7H12O2 =

The molecular formula C_{7}H_{12}O_{2} may refer to:

- Butyl acrylate
- Cyclohexanecarboxylic acid
- trans-3-Methyl-2-hexenoic acid (TMHA)
