= 3-Methyl-3-sulfanylhexan-1-ol =

Names
- Preferred IUPAC name 3-Methyl-3-sulfanylhexan-1-ol

Identifiers
CAS Number	307964-23-4
3D model (JSmol)	Interactive image
ChEBI	CHEBI:146780
ChemSpider	8305557
EC Number	608-525-2
PubChem CID	10130039
CompTox Dashboard (EPA)	DTXSID90435943
- InChI: InChI=1S/C7H16OS/c1-3-4-7(2,9)5-6-8/h8-9H,3-6H2,1-2H3 Key: PSALIMFZUGITJC-UHFFFAOYSA-N
- SMILES: CCCC(C)(CCO)S

Properties
Chemical formula	C_{7}H_{16}OS
Molar mass	148.26 g·mol^{−1}
Refractive index (n_{D})	1.482

Hazards
- Occupational safety and health (OHS/OSH)
Main hazards	Stench
- GHS labelling
Pictograms	(GHS07: Exclamation mark)
Signal word	Warning
Hazard statements	H315, H319, H335
- Except where otherwise noted, data are given for materials in their standard state (at 25 °C [77 °F], 100 kPa). verify (what is ?) Infobox references

3-Methyl-3-sulfanylhexan-1-ol (3M3SH) is a primary alcohol that is hexan-1-ol which is substituted by a methyl group and a thiol group at position 3. It is the odor component of human axilla sweat and the major species at pH 7.3.

The molecule was identified in 2004. The odor may be described as "rotten onions or meat" while its (R)/(S) enantiomers are described as "sweat and onion-like" for (S) and "fruity and grapefruit-like" for (R). Some variation between enantiomer ratios may exist due to gender differences in skin micribiota composition and in precursor molecule production.

== Synthesis ==
Apocrine sweat glands produce an S-glutathione conjugate secreted via ABCC11 transporters into vesicles. The conjugate is converted into a S-Cys-Gly-3M3SH thiol before excretion through the gland to the skin.

Bacteria found to create 3M3SH from human sweat include primarily Staphylococcus haemolyticus, other Staphylococcus clade members such as Staphylococcus hominis, and Corynebacterium xerosis, though at a lesser extent compared to S. haemolyticus. In S. hominis, the bacterial cell imports the thiol precursor via a proton-coupled oligopeptide transporter (proton pump). After intake of the thiol precursor, the strains metabolize it to produce 3-methyl-3-sulfanylhexan-1-ol.

== See also ==
- Body odor
