= Underarm liners =

Personal hygiene product

Underarm liners are an alternative to antiperspirants. The liners are applied directly to clothing. They contain absorbent material that wicks away moisture from sweat, keeping the axilla dry. Underarm liners were used more commonly before chemical antiperspirants, primarily by women, to preserve fine dresses from soiling. Sweat contains substances that stain yellow or fade dyes. Underarm liners are also known as underarm shields, underarm pads, sweat guards, dress shields, and pity protectors.

== History ==
For centuries, heavy colognes were used to mask body odor. In the late nineteenth century chemists developed products that prevented the formation of body odor, but these still could not prevent underarm sweating. Early antiperspirants eventually included creams, solids, pads, dabbers, roll-ons, and powders. Today, anti-perspirants are most common in the forms of sticks, sprays, and roll-ons. But an older form of sweat protection, underarm liners, never went away.

== Reusable underarm liners ==
The traditional reusable (or washable) liners are less common today. Typically used only by women, the liner secures to the underarm area of the garment via an adjustable strap on a bra. Reusable liners consist of double ply cotton on one side and either a nylon or vinyl barrier on the other side. The cotton side rests on the actual skin of the armpit while the vinyl or nylon rests on the clothing as the final barrier, preventing any sweat from reaching the garment.

== Disposable underarm liners ==
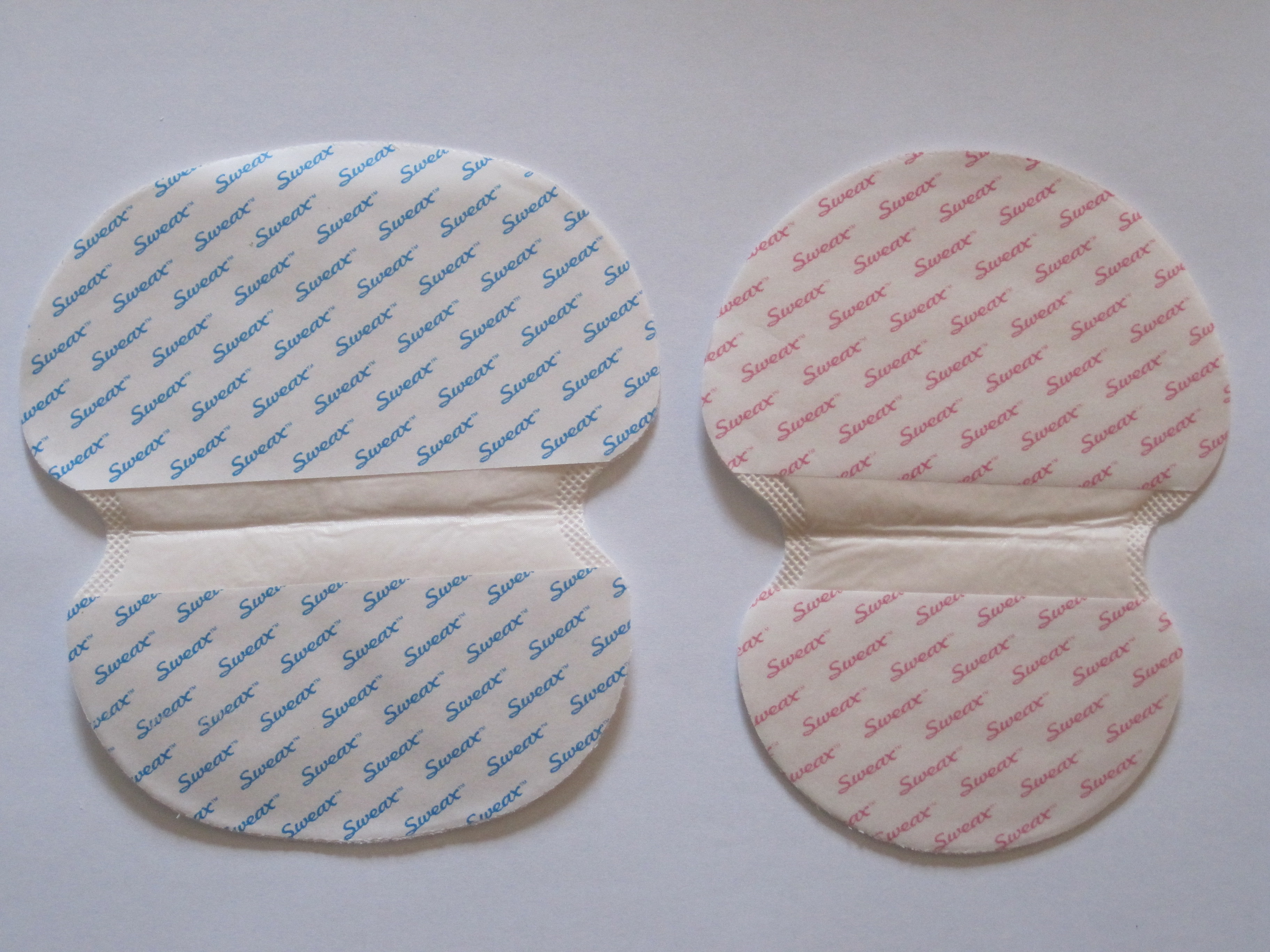
Disposable "peel and stick" underarm liners are made for both men and women.

Disposable liners are offered for men and women. The thin liner is a "peel and stick" product the user places directly onto the inside of the garment. One side of the liner consists of a plastic barrier with a layer of purposely formulated glue. The other side of the liner is the absorbent side. Constructed with air-laid paper, it rests against the skin of the armpit and absorbs the moisture.

== See also ==
- Hyperhidrosis
