= (3Z)-Nonenal =

Organic compound in various plants

- Structural formula of (3Z)-nonenal

Names
- Preferred IUPAC name (3Z)-Non-3-enal
- Other names: (Z)-3-Nonenal; (Z)-Non-3-enal; cis-3-Nonenal

Identifiers
CAS Number	31823-43-5
3D model (JSmol)	Interactive image
ChEBI	CHEBI:191226
ChemSpider	4936380
PubChem CID	6431042
- InChI: InChI=1S/C9H16O/c1-2-3-4-5-6-7-8-9-10/h6-7,9H,2-5,8H2,1H3/b7-6- Key: YXEAENVLZOODMT-SREVYHEPSA-N
- SMILES: CCCCC/C=C\CC=O

Properties
Chemical formula	C_{9}H_{16}O
Molar mass	140.226 g·mol^{−1}
Appearance	Colorless oil
Boiling point	105 °C (221 °F; 378 K) (20 mmHg)

Hazards
- GHS labelling
Pictograms	(GHS07: Exclamation mark)
Signal word	Warning
Hazard statements	H315, H319, H335
Precautionary statements	P261, P305+P351+P338
- Except where otherwise noted, data are given for materials in their standard state (at 25 °C [77 °F], 100 kPa). Infobox references

(3Z)-Nonenal is an unsaturated aldehyde that occurs naturally in various plants.

== Occurrence ==
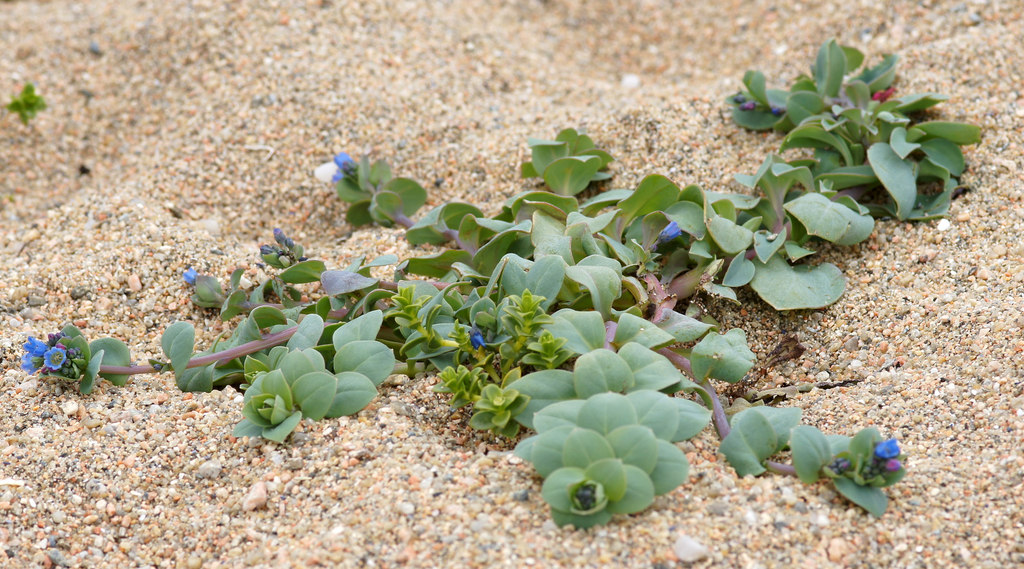
The oysterplant, also known as sea bluebells, contains (3Z)-nonenal

(3Z)-Nonenal is a flavor component in various plants, such as cucumber, honeydew melon, and soy. It is the biosynthetic precursor to (2E)-nonenal, formed by isomerases. It also occurs in the brown algae Laminaria angustata. In the oysterplant, it contributes to its oyster-like taste.

== Biosynthesis ==
In various plants such as cucumbers and melons, (3Z)-nonenal is formed from linoleic acid to 9-hydroperoxy-10,12-octadecadienoic acid and its splitting. In Laminaria angustata, formation also occurs via arachidonic acid and its 12-hydroperoxide.

== Synthesis ==
(3Z)-Nonenal can be synthesized by oxidation of (3Z)-nonen-1-ol with pyridinium chlorochromate. The compound can also be obtained through a multi-step reaction starting from 1,4-butanediol.

== Properties ==
The scent is described as fruity, melony, or maritime in low concentrations. In an in vitro study, (3Z)-nonenal acted as a fungicide against various types of fungi.
