= Arras lace =

Type of bobbin lace from Arras, France

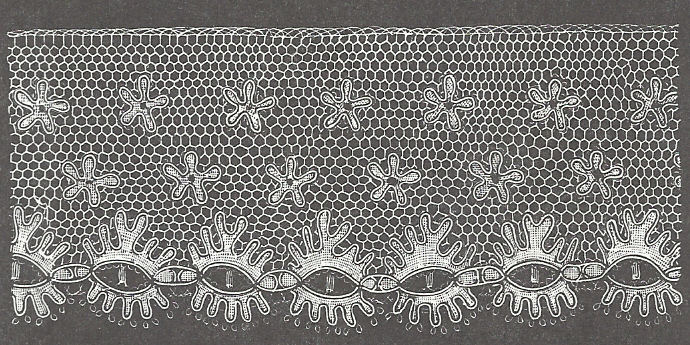
- Type: Lace
- Production method: Bobbin lace
- Production process: Craft production
- Place of origin: Arras, France
- Introduced: 17th century

Arras lace refers to a form of pure white bobbin lace that was made at Arras, France, from the 17th to 19th centuries. It is similar to, but stronger than Lille lace. Arras also produced gold lace and a lightweight lace called mignonette.

Orris is another term for gold or silver bobbin lace, derived from the word Arras.

The lace of Arras reached its peak during 1804 to 1812 and then declined. In 1851, there were 8,000 lace-makers in a radius of eight miles round the city. By 1881, only one house was making a speciality of the old patterns.
