= Trans,cis-2,6-Nonadienal =

trans,cis-2,6-Nonadienal
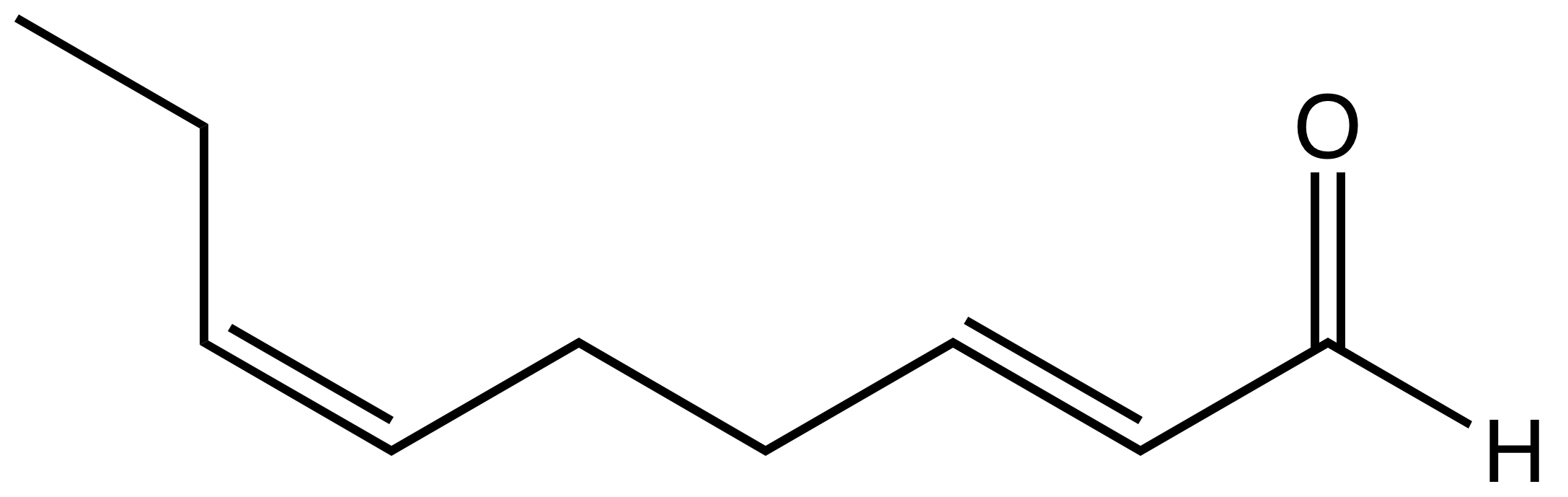

Names
- Preferred IUPAC name (2E,6Z)-Nona-2,6-dienal
- Other names (E,Z)-2,6-Nonadienal; Violet leaf aldehyde Cucumber aldehyde

Identifiers
CAS Number	557-48-2
3D model (JSmol)	Interactive image
ChEBI	CHEBI:7610
ChemSpider	558840
ECHA InfoCard	100.008.345
PubChem CID	643731
UNII	93E895X03C
CompTox Dashboard (EPA)	DTXSID1047104
- InChI: InChI=1S/C9H14O/c1-2-3-4-5-6-7-8-9-10/h3-4,7-9H,2,5-6H2,1H3/b4-3-,8-7+ Key: HZYHMHHBBBSGHB-ODYTWBPASA-N
- SMILES: CC/C=C\CC/C=C/C=O

Properties
Chemical formula	C_{9}H_{14}O
Molar mass	138.210 g·mol^{−1}
Appearance	Colorless oil

Hazards
- GHS labelling
Pictograms	(GHS07: Exclamation mark)
Signal word	Warning
Hazard statements	H315, H317
Precautionary statements	P261, P264, P272, P280, P302+P352, P321, P332+P313, P333+P313, P362, P363, P501
- Except where otherwise noted, data are given for materials in their standard state (at 25 °C [77 °F], 100 kPa). Infobox references

trans,cis-2,6-Nonadienal (also known as (E,Z)-2,6-nonadienal or "cucumber aldehyde") is an organic compound that is classified as a doubly unsaturated derivative of nonanal. The molecule consists of a α,β-unsaturated aldehyde with an isolated alkene group. The compound having an odour described as "green, fatty, dry, cucumber, violet leaf, melon", has attracted attention as the essence of cucumbers, but it is also found in bread crust and freshly cut watermelon.

== Biosynthesis ==
Isotopic labeling has indicated that nonadienal is formed from α-linolenic acid. Such reactions are typically catalyzed by hydroperoxide lyases.

== See also ==
- 2-Nonenal - Structurally related, aroma of cucumber
- 6-Nonenal - Structurally related, aroma of cantaloupe
