= ABCC12 =

Protein-coding gene in the species Homo sapiens

Identifiers
- Aliases: ABCC12, MRP9, ATP binding cassette subfamily C member 12
- External IDs: OMIM: 607041; MGI: 2441679; GeneCards: ABCC12

Gene location (Human)
Chr.	Chromosome 16 (human)
Band	16q12.1	Start	48,081,006 bp
Band	16q12.1	End	48,156,018 bp

Gene location (Mouse)
Chr.	Chromosome 8 (mouse)
Band	8 C3|8 42.06 cM	Start	87,208,889 bp
Band	8 C3|8 42.06 cM	End	87,307,315 bp
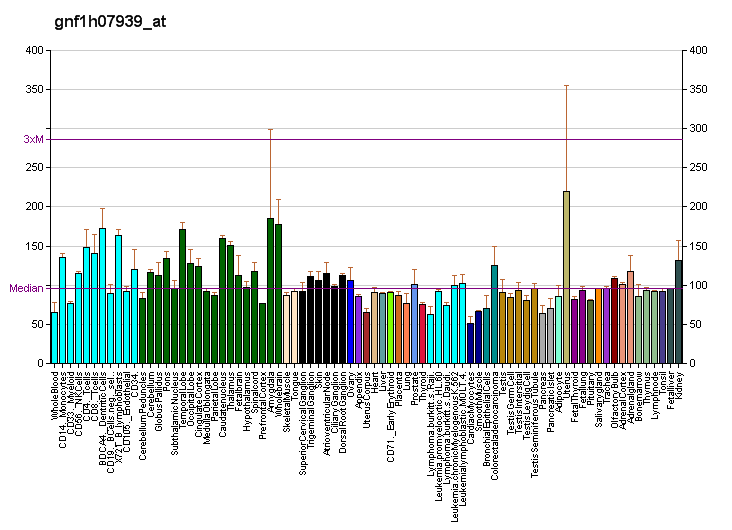

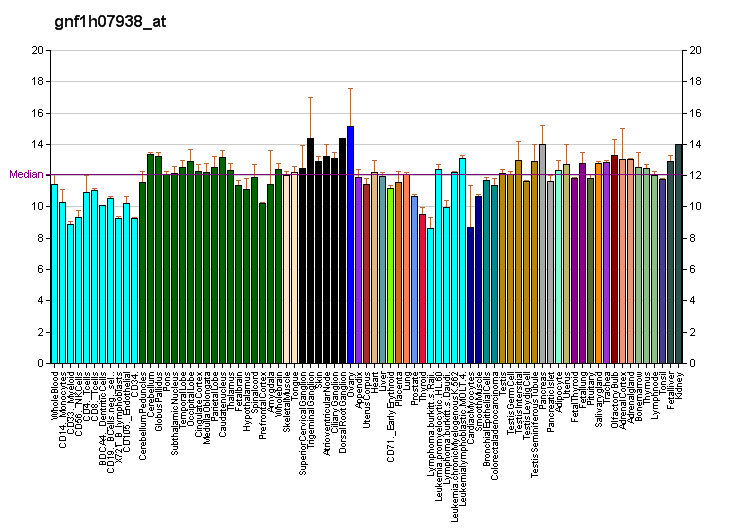
RNA expression pattern
Bgee	Human / Mouse (ortholog); Top expressed in: gonad; left testis; right testis; testicle; right frontal lobe; prefrontal cortex; Brodmann area 9; anterior cingulate cortex; muscle of thigh; primary visual cortex / Top expressed in: spermatocyte; seminiferous tubule; spermatid; Leydig cell; seminal vesicula; lumbar subsegment of spinal cord; embryo; Sertoli cell; striatum of neuraxis; cerebellum; More reference expression data
BioGPS	More reference expression data
Gene ontology
Molecular function	nucleotide binding; ATPase activity; ATP binding; ATPase-coupled transmembrane transporter activity
Cellular component	integral component of membrane; membrane
Biological process	transmembrane transport
Sources:Amigo / QuickGO
Orthologs
Databases	NCBI: entry; OMA: entry
Species	Human	Mouse
Entrez	94160	244562
Ensembl	ENSG00000140798	ENSMUSG00000036872
UniProt	Q96J65	Q80WJ6
RefSeq (mRNA)	NM_145190; NM_033226; NM_145187; NM_145188; NM_145189	NM_172912
RefSeq (protein)	NP_150229	NP_766500
Location (UCSC)	Chr 16: 48.08 – 48.16 Mb	Chr 8: 87.21 – 87.31 Mb
PubMed search
- Wikidata
View/Edit Human	View/Edit Mouse

Multidrug resistance-associated protein 9 is a protein that in humans is encoded by the ABCC12 gene.

== Function ==
This gene is a member of the superfamily of ATP-binding cassette (ABC) transporters and the encoded protein contains two ATP-binding domains and 12 transmembrane regions. ABC proteins transport various molecules across extra- and intracellular membranes. ABC genes are divided into seven distinct subfamilies: ABC1, MDR/TAP, MRP, ALD, OABP, GCN20, and White. This gene is a member of the MRP subfamily which is involved in multi-drug resistance. This gene and another subfamily member are arranged head-to-tail on chromosome 16q12.1. Increased expression of this gene is associated with breast cancer. Loss of function is implicated in hereditary cholestasis.
