= 6-Nonenal =

- cis-6-Nonenal

- trans-6-Nonenal

Names
- IUPAC names (Z)-Non-6-enal (E)-Non-6-enal
- Other names 6-Nonenal

Identifiers
CAS Number	6728-35-4; 2277-20-5 (E); 2277-19-2 (Z)
3D model (JSmol)	Interactive image; (E): Interactive image; (Z): Interactive image
ChemSpider	15903; 4446459 (E); 4515200 (Z)
PubChem CID	16778; 5283338 (E); 5362720 (Z)
CompTox Dashboard (EPA)	DTXSID60859713
- InChI: InChI=1/C9H16O/c1-2-3-4-5-6-7-8-9-10/h3-4,9H,2,5-8H2,1H3 Key: RTNPCOBSXBGDMO-UHFFFAOYAV; (E): InChI=1/C9H16O/c1-2-3-4-5-6-7-8-9-10/h3-4,9H,2,5-8H2,1H3/b4-3+ Key: RTNPCOBSXBGDMO-ONEGZZNKBC; (Z): InChI=1/C9H16O/c1-2-3-4-5-6-7-8-9-10/h3-4,9H,2,5-8H2,1H3/b4-3- Key: RTNPCOBSXBGDMO-ARJAWSKDBN
- SMILES: O=CCCCCC=CCC; (E): O=CCCCC/C=C/CC; (Z): O=CCCCC/C=C\CC

Properties
Chemical formula	C_{9}H_{16}O
Molar mass	140.226 g·mol^{−1}
Appearance	Colorless liquid
Density	0.841 g/cm^{3}
Boiling point	62 to 63 °C (144 to 145 °F; 335 to 336 K) at 2 mmHg
Solubility in water	0.63 g/L

Hazards
- Occupational safety and health (OHS/OSH)
Main hazards	Irritant
Flash point	113 °C (235 °F; 386 K)
- Except where otherwise noted, data are given for materials in their standard state (at 25 °C [77 °F], 100 kPa). Infobox references

6-Nonenal is an organic compound with the formula C_{2}H_{5}CH=CH(CH_{2})_{4}CHO. Other isomeric nonenal compounds are also known to exist naturally, e.g. 2-nonenal. The cis-isomer of 6-nonenal is often listed as the principal component in the aromas of muskmelon fruits. The trans-isomer is listed as an off-flavor aroma of milk foams, and thought to be a possible polypropylene odorant.

== Odour ==
The odour of the (Z)-isomer is described as "green, cucumber, melon, cantaloupe, honeydew, waxy".

== Biosynthesis ==
6-Nonenal is thought to be biosynthesized from γ-lineolenic acid catalyzed by a lipoxygenase. The lipoxygenase converts alkene groups into hydroperoxides, which cleave by hydroperoxide lyase into the corresponding cis-aldehydes. Consistent with this mechanism, the odor of muskmelons requires exposure to air. In the ripe, unmodified muskmelon, cis-6-nonenal exists in only low concentration. A steep increase in the concentration of 6-nonenal is noticed when the cells are lysed and exposed to air. This increase is attributed to rapid formation of hydroperoxides. Trans,cis-2,6-nonadienal is a related fragrance that arises via a similar pathway.

== Laboratory synthesis ==
Either geometric isomer of this compound may be prepared by preparing by brominating 5-octene-1-ol, then preparing the appropriate Grignard reagent. Triethyl orthoformate is treated with this Grignard reagent, then hydrolyzed to give 6-nonenal.

== See also ==
- 2-Nonenal - isomer
