= Metal lace =

Lace made from metal or metallic threads

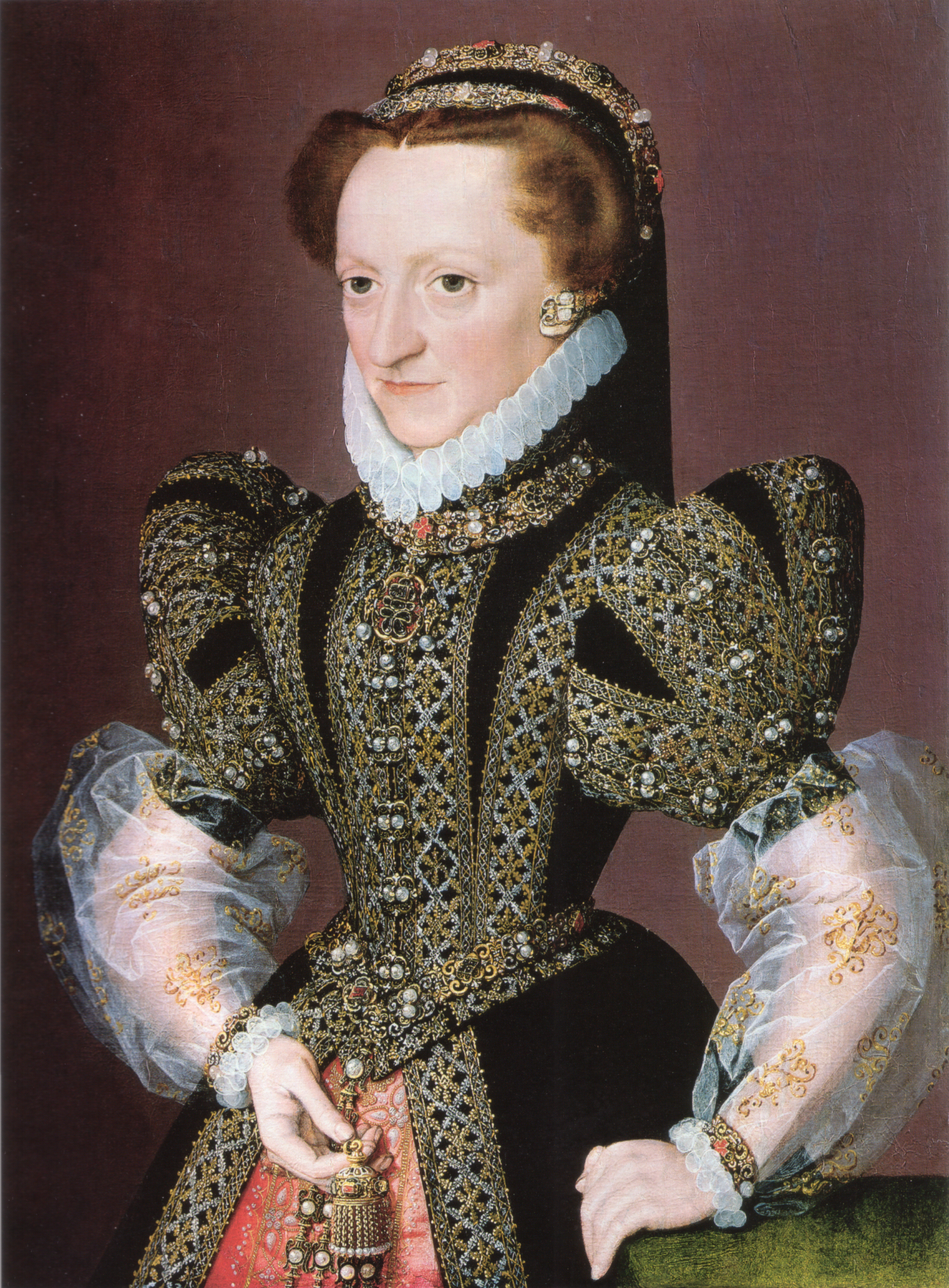
Early bobbin lace in gold and silver thread, c. 1570

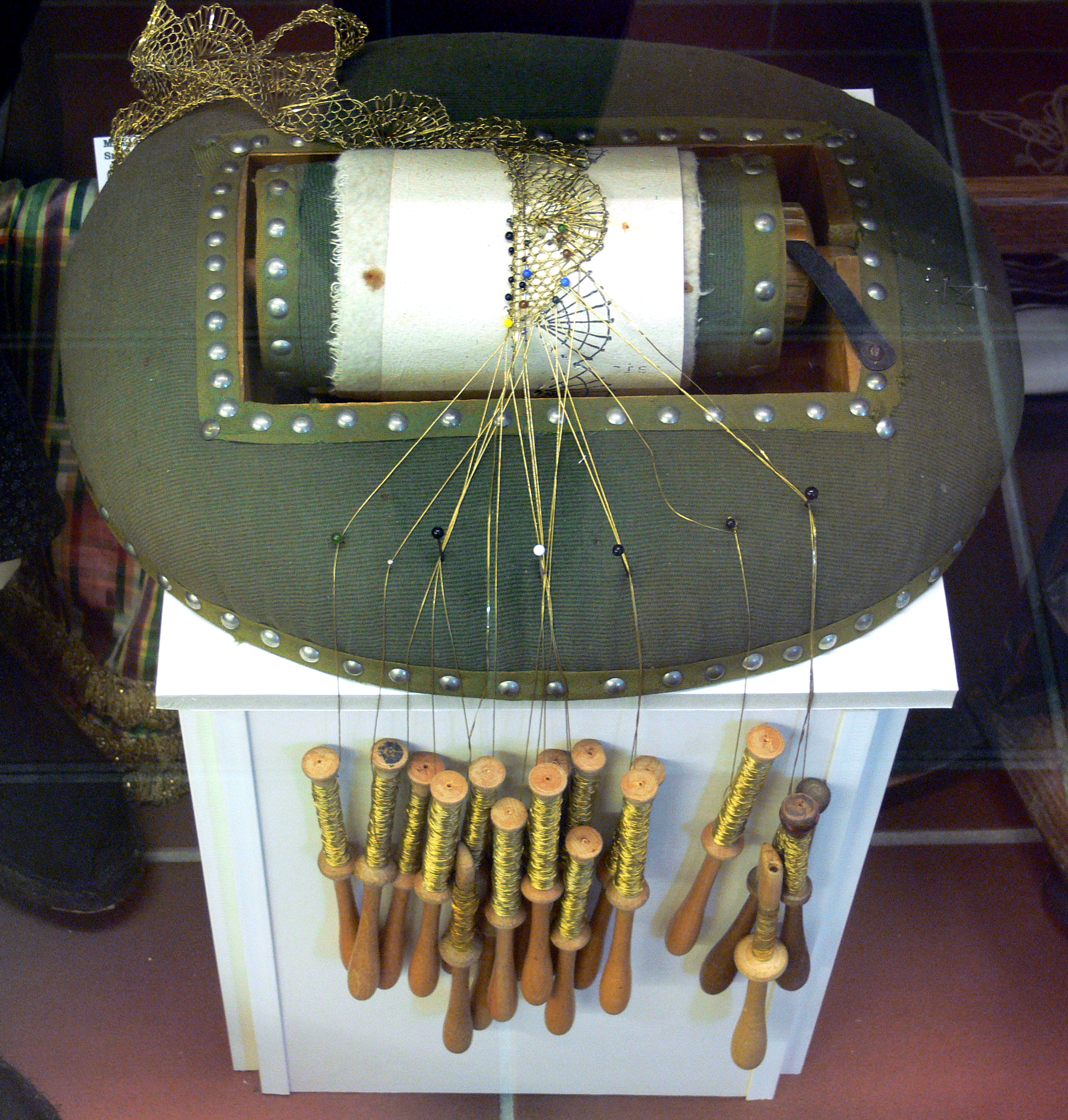
Klöppelspitze MfK Wgt

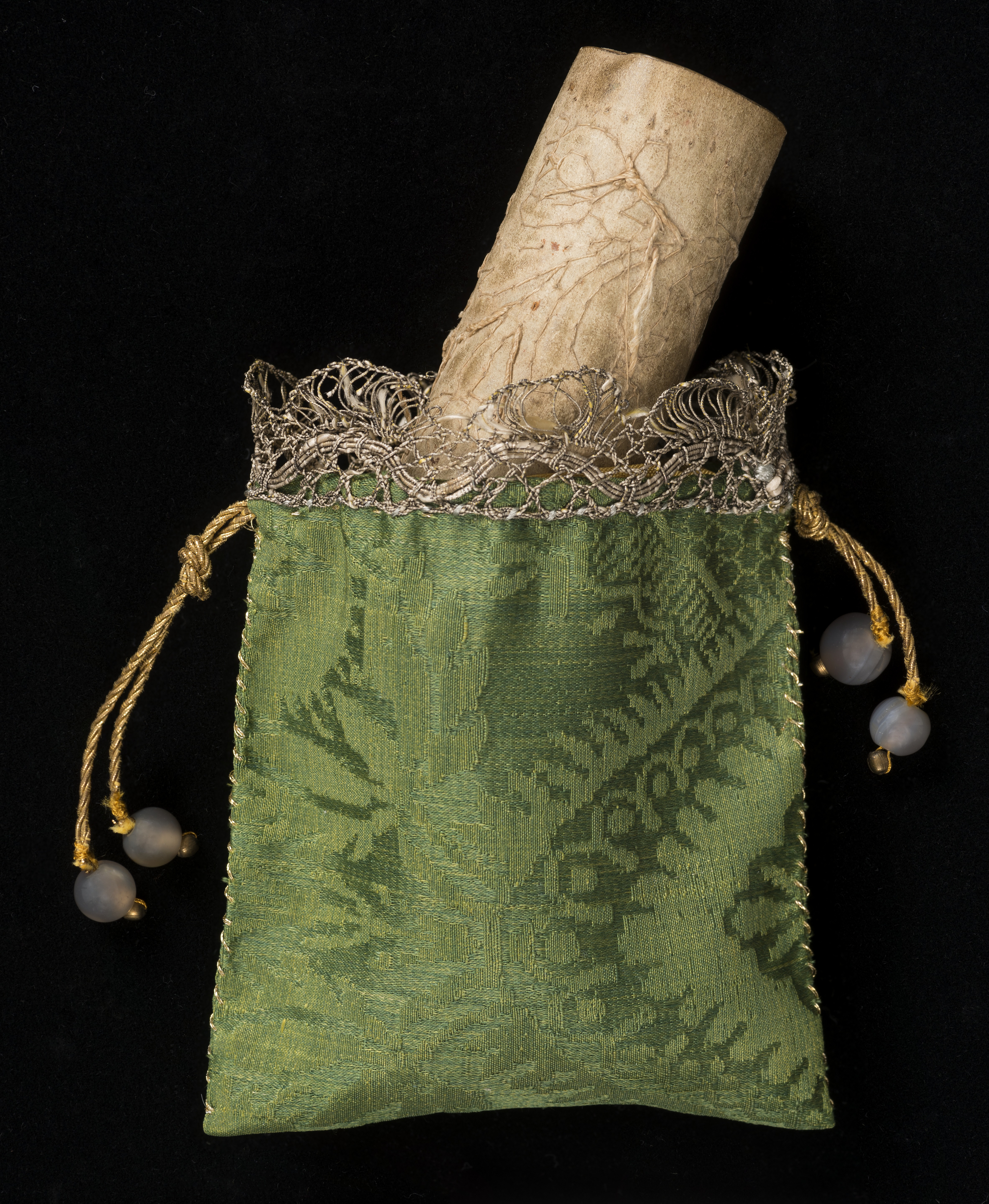
Parchment With Unfinished Needle Lace (England), 17th century (CH 18637569)

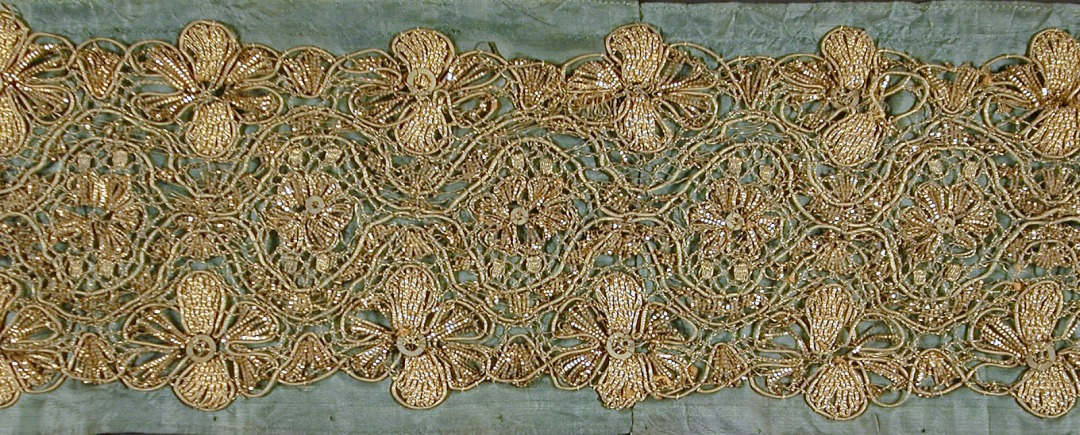
Length of Lace LACMA M.67.50.25 (1 of 2)

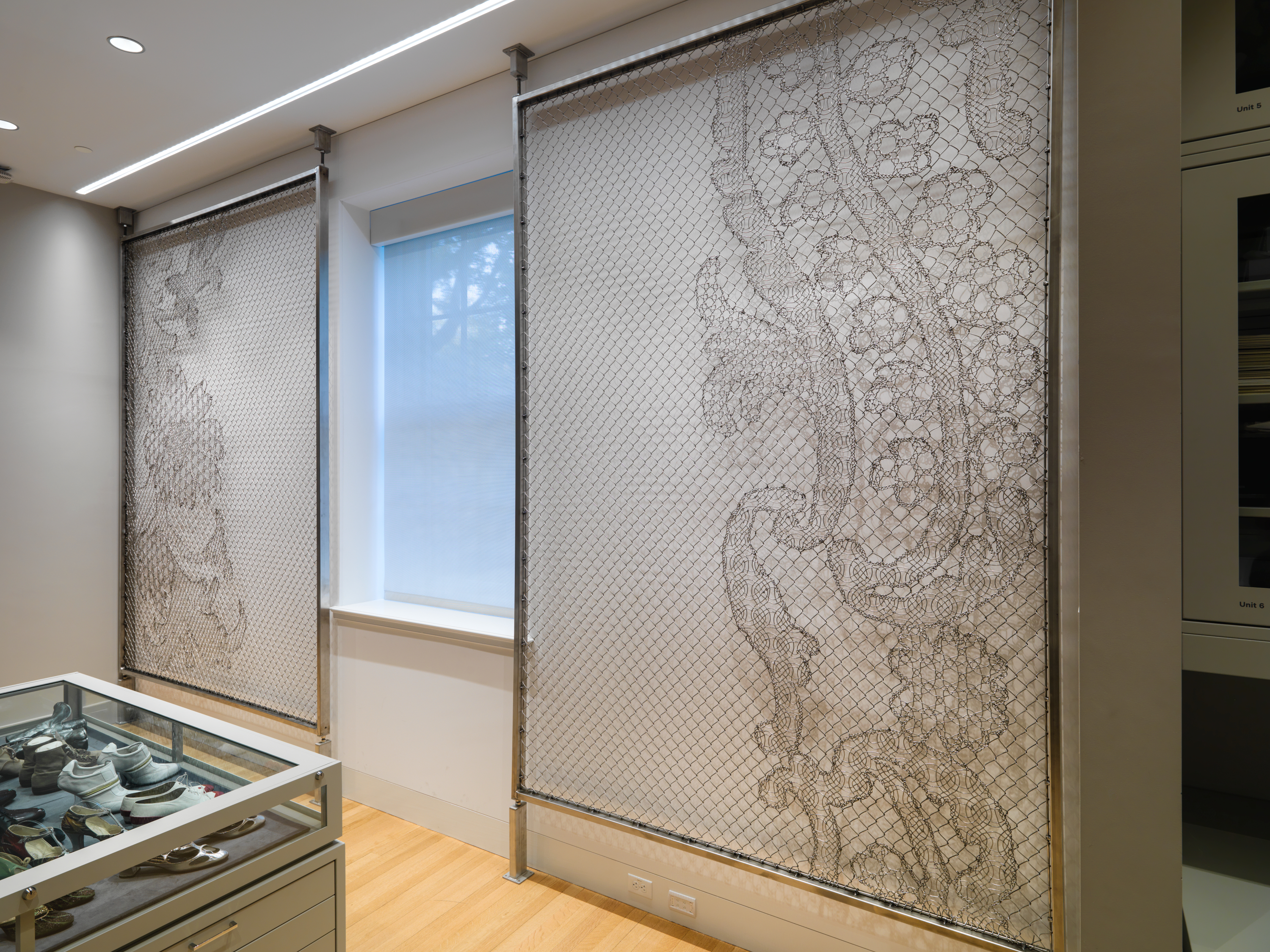
Chain link fence with lace motifs

Metal lace describes a type of lace made from metal or metallic threads, such as gold, silver, or copper. The designs can be worked on a textile ground, or the lace can completely be made from metallic threads. It is mainly used as an embellishment for military uniforms, fashionable, ceremonial and theatrical dress, and ecclesiastical textiles.

== Gold lace ==
Lace made using gold wire has been produced since antiquity, with examples of gold netting found in Egyptian and Assyrian tombs from 1500 to 1000 BCE. It was mainly produced as an embellishment for religious vestments and high status garments. Metal lace, including gold and silver point de Venise, was produced in Italy until the 15th century, when high taxation and sumptuary laws led to textile threads such as linen replacing the use of metal. To avoid these costs, the production of metal lace moved to France, where a high demand by royalty and the French aristocracy led to Arras, Aurillac and other locations becoming renowned for gold lace production. From the 15th century on, most metal lace was a combination of metal and textile threads, rather than made of pure metal.

Orris is another term for gold or silver lace, used especially in the 18th century; the term derived from Arras lace, made in Arras, France.

Gold lace and braiding was a popular option for military uniforms because it resisted tarnish, unlike other metal laces.

Contemporary gold lace usually has a high silver percentage, which can be as high as 90%, with the actual gold content as low as 3%. Much modern gold (and other metal) lace is now manufactured in India. Modern Indian "pure gold lace" is technically made from silver that has been electroplated with gold.

== Copper lace ==
Lace made from copper wire was widely used in Elizabethan era theatre costuming as a substitute for more expensive gold and silver laces. It was a major import, with several tons of copper thread being imported into England between 1594 and 1596, and at the turn of the 16th and 17th centuries, cost between 9 and 16 pennies an ounce. It had a tendency to tarnish, and was less hard-wearing.

== Other metals ==
A type of die stamped metal "lace" was produced in the 19th and 20th century as a trimming for coffins. Coffin lace became a major industry in Birmingham, where its manufacture in the 1860s could use up to 70 tons of tin per year. Like other laces, machine-made versions of imitation metallic laces became available.

Metal fence designs with lace motifs are another type of metal lace. Created initially as a student design project by Joep Verhoeven, various chain link fence segments with traditional lace motif designs have been displayed.

The history of metal threads and their use in contemporary lace continues to be an area of research. Using knowledge and skills associated with incorporation of metal threads into textiles such as lace may assist in the integration of e-textiles and sensors into future products.

== Gallery ==
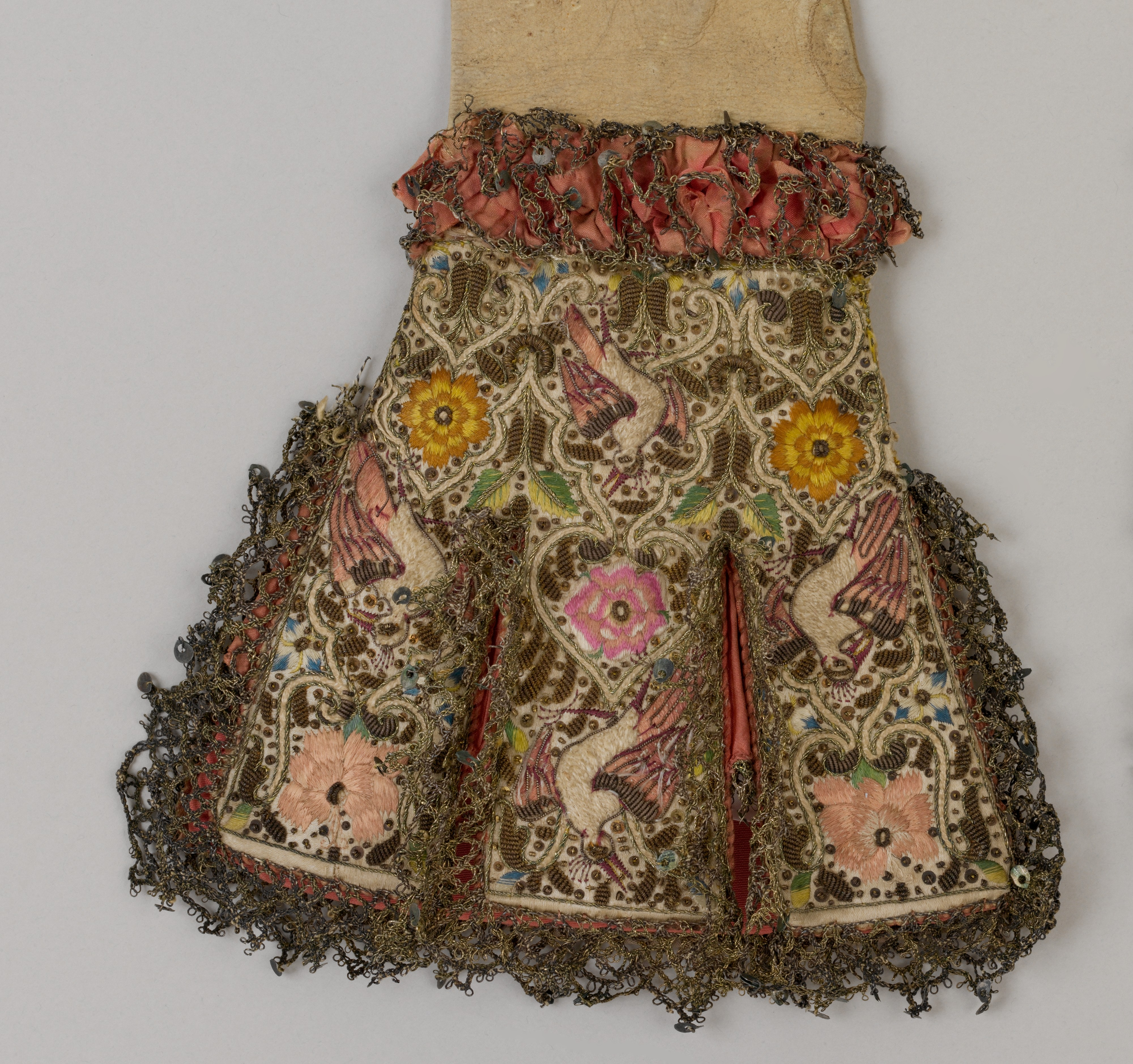
Pair of gloves with early bobbin lace

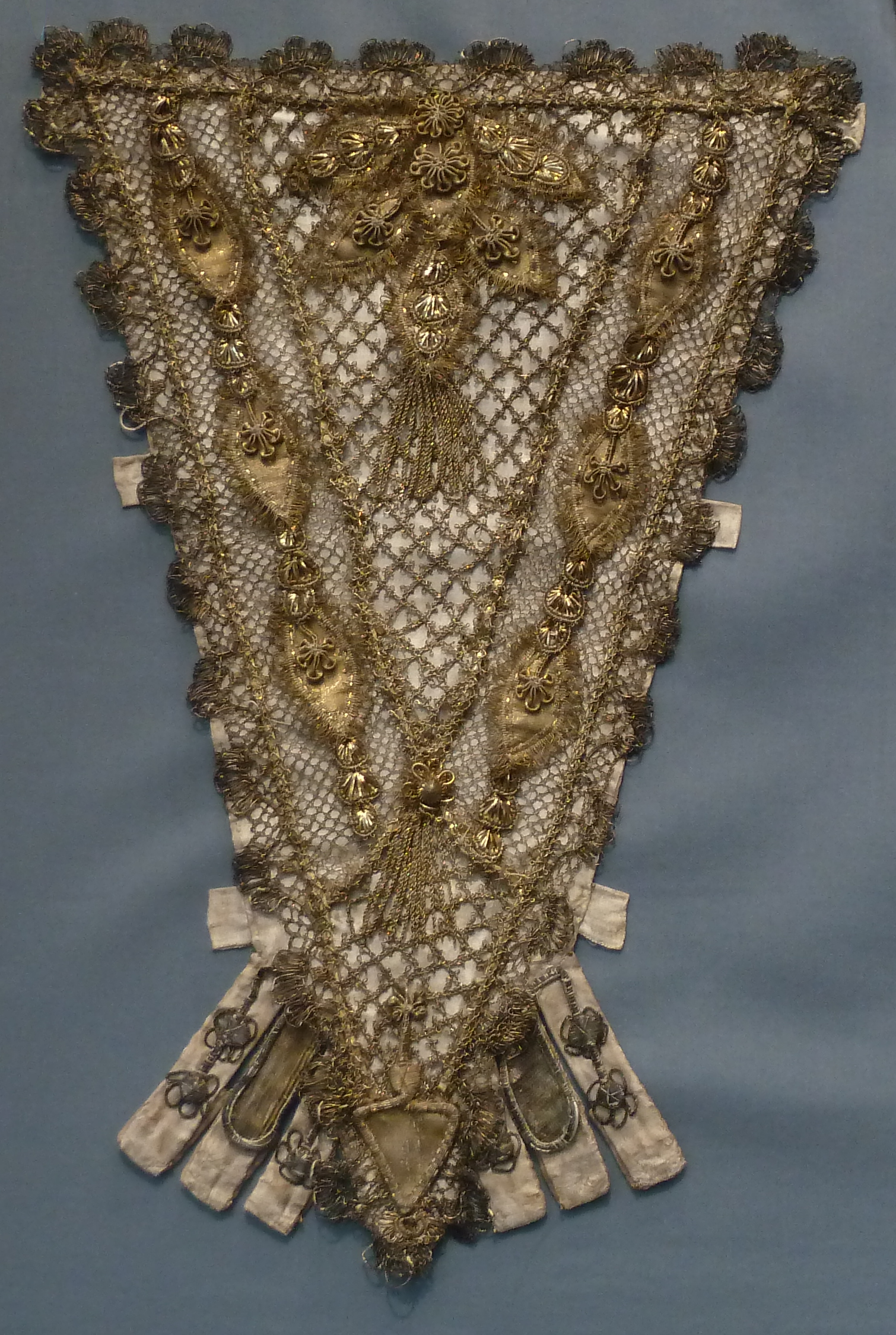
Stomacher with goldwork France

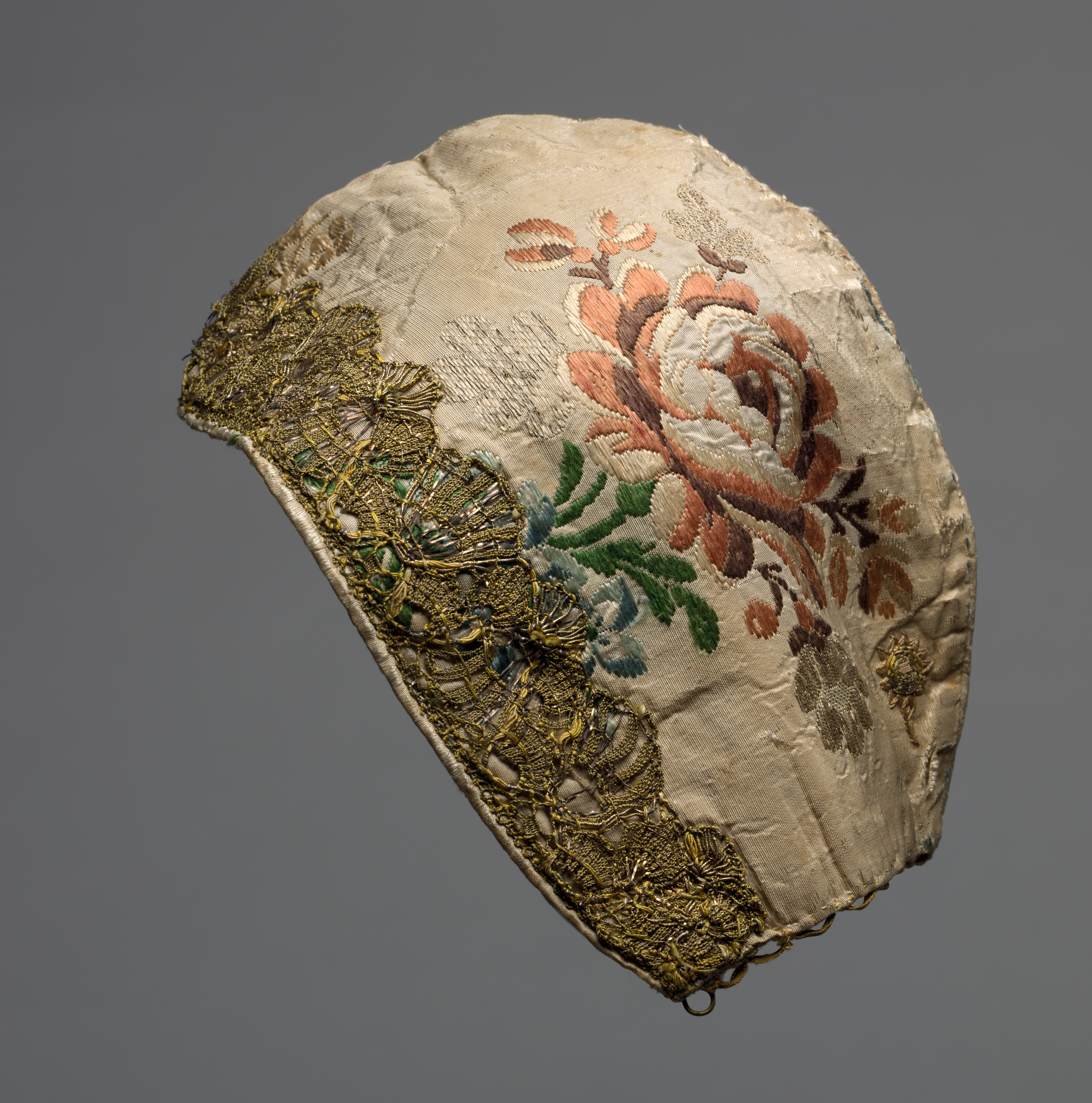
France, Strasbourg, mid-18th century, Period of Louis XV - Cap - 1919.855 - Cleveland Museum of Art

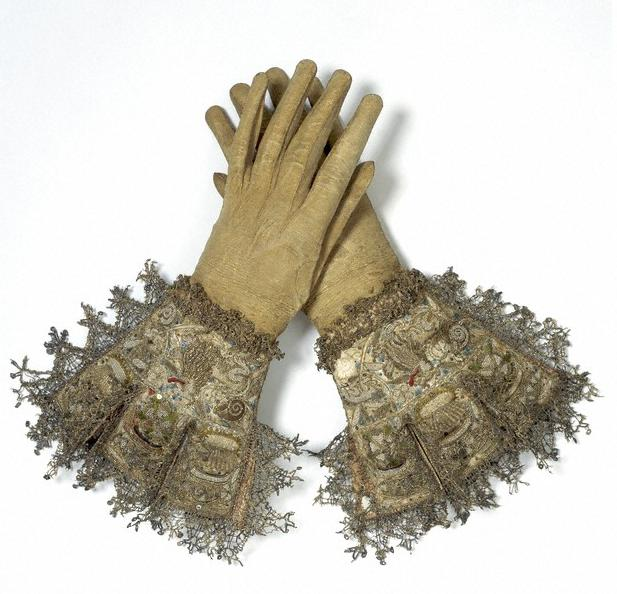
Gloves, V and A

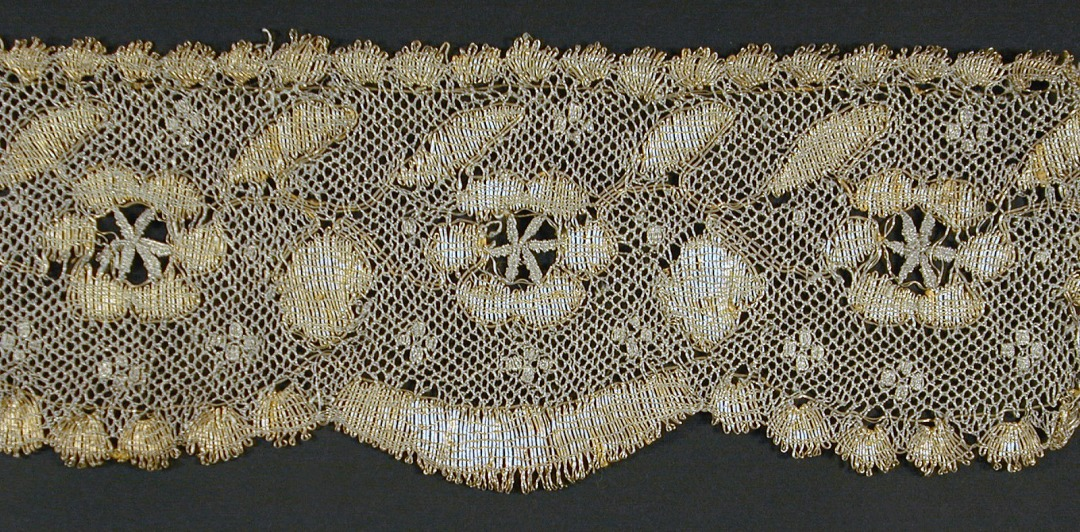
Fragment of Lace LACMA M.67.50.7

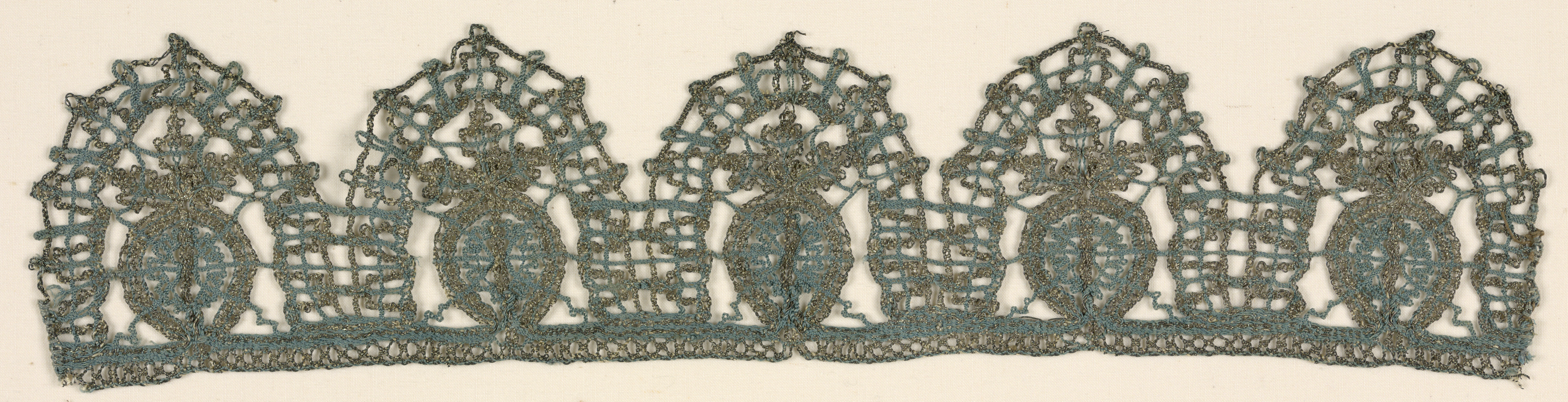
Trimming (Italy), early 17th century (CH 18384469-2)

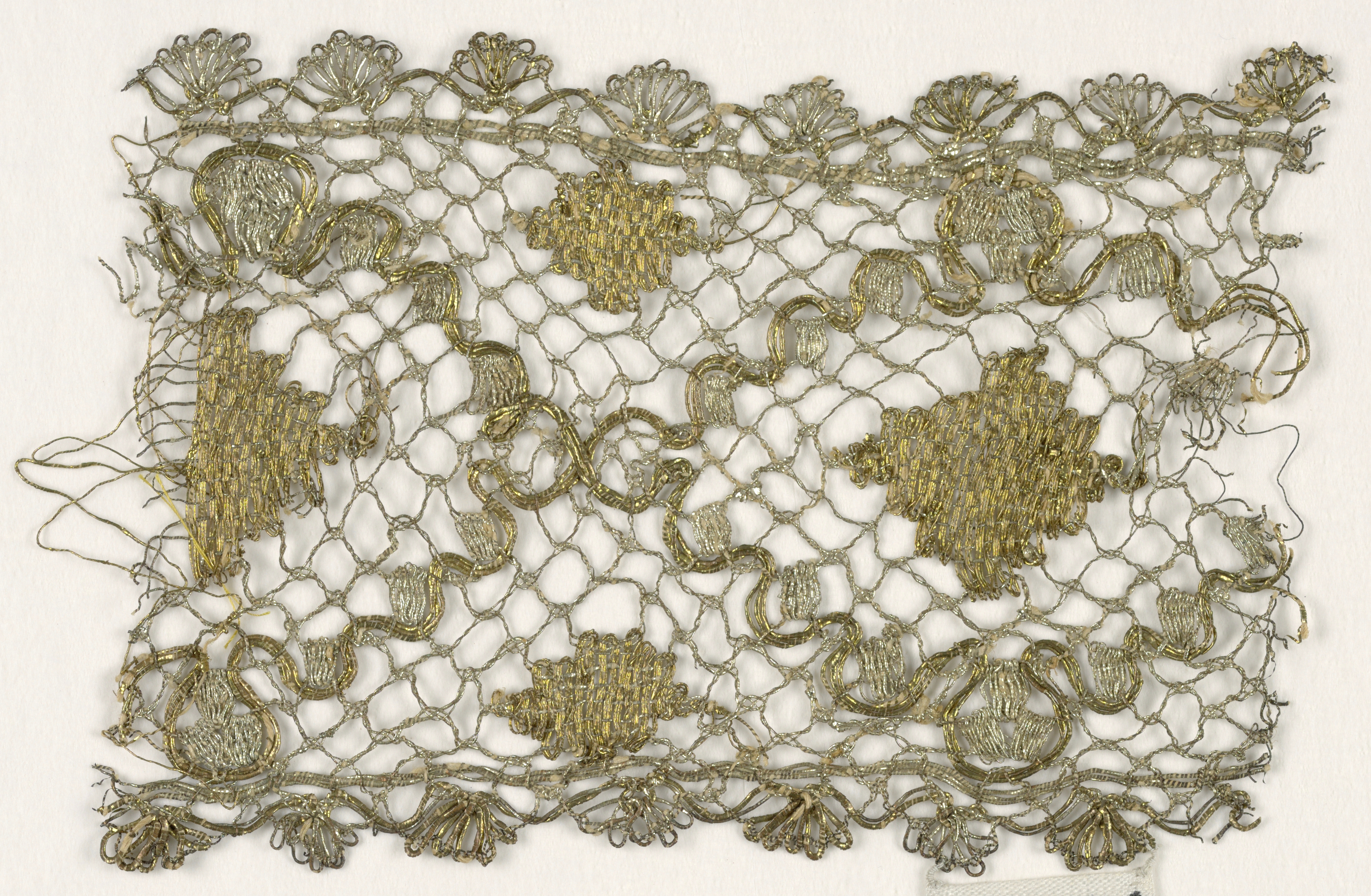
Fragment (Italy), 17th century (CH 18173163-2)

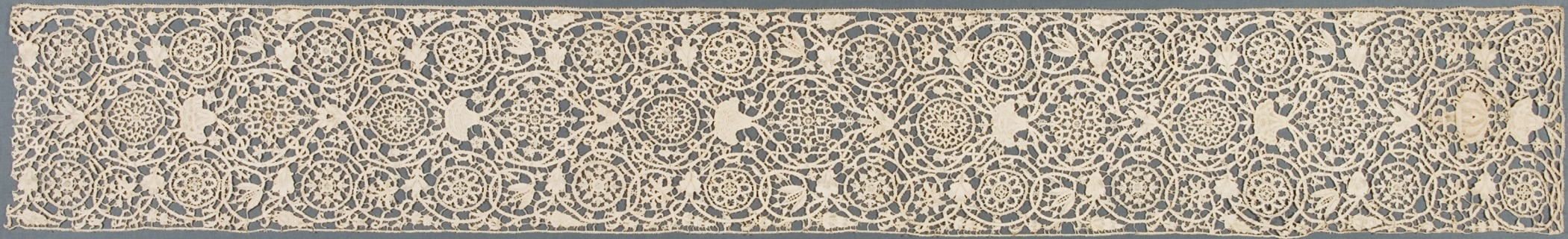
Length of Lace LACMA M.67.50.15 (1 of 2)

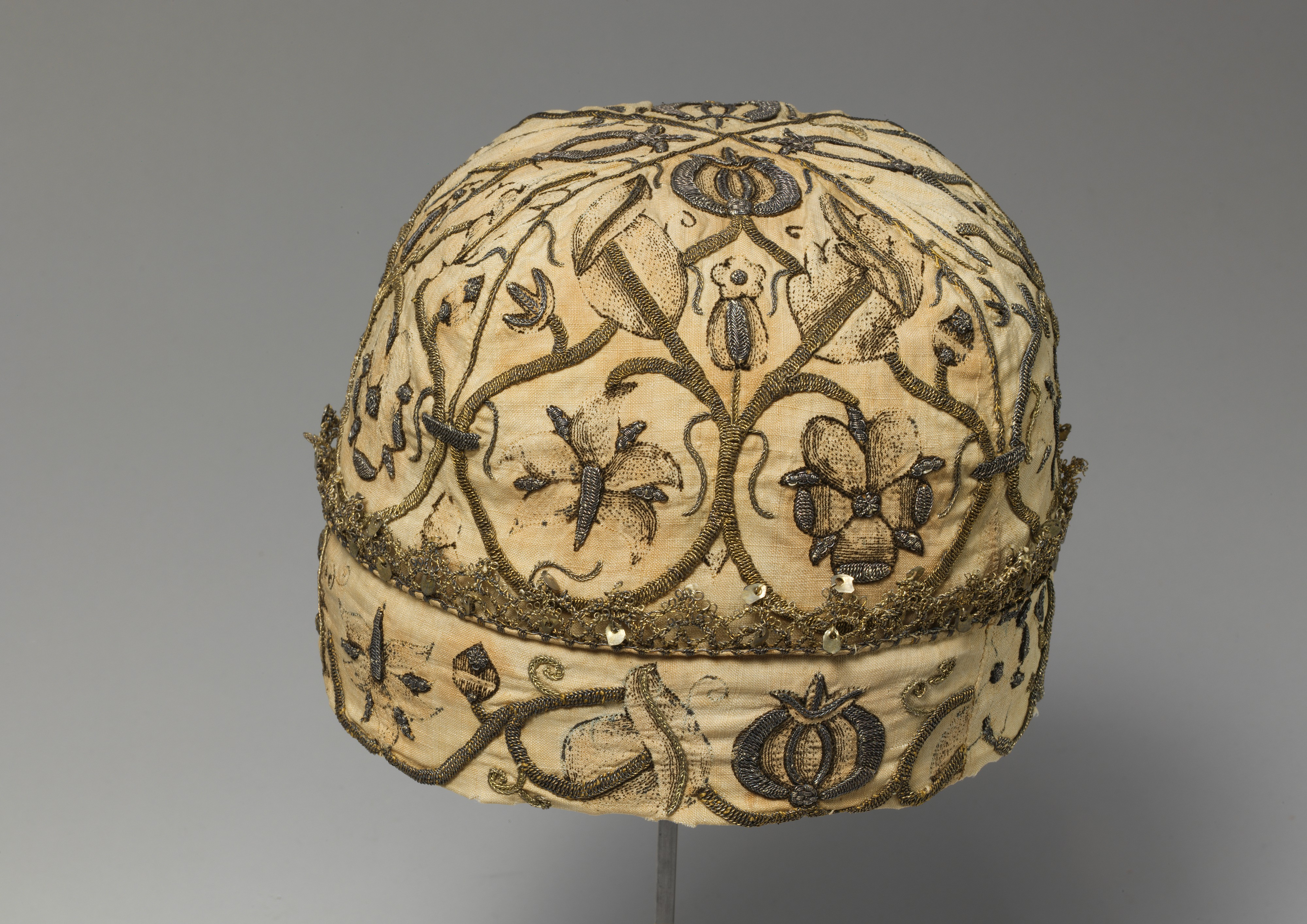
Night cap MET DP159783

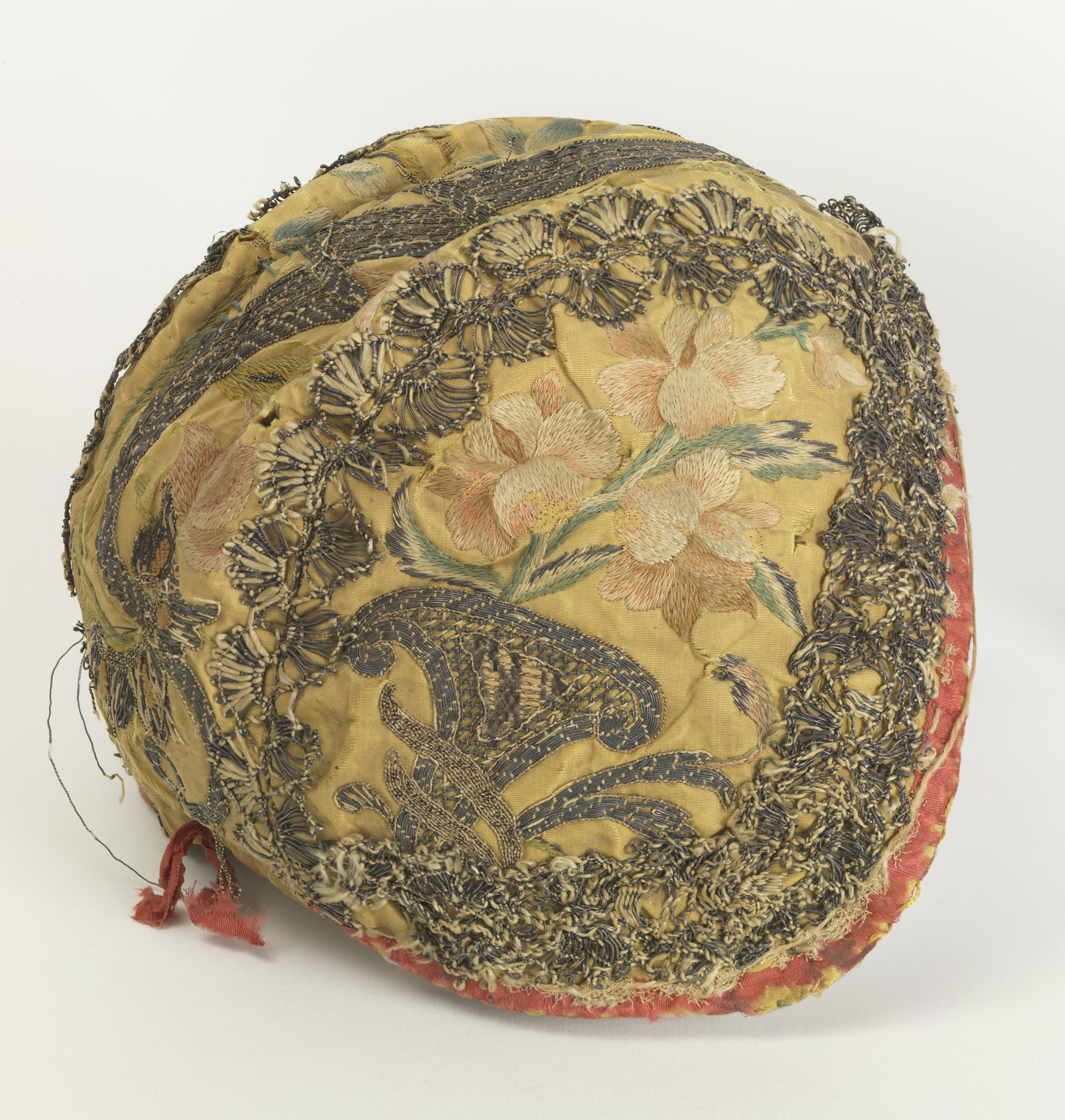
Cap, 17th–18th century (CH 18344921)

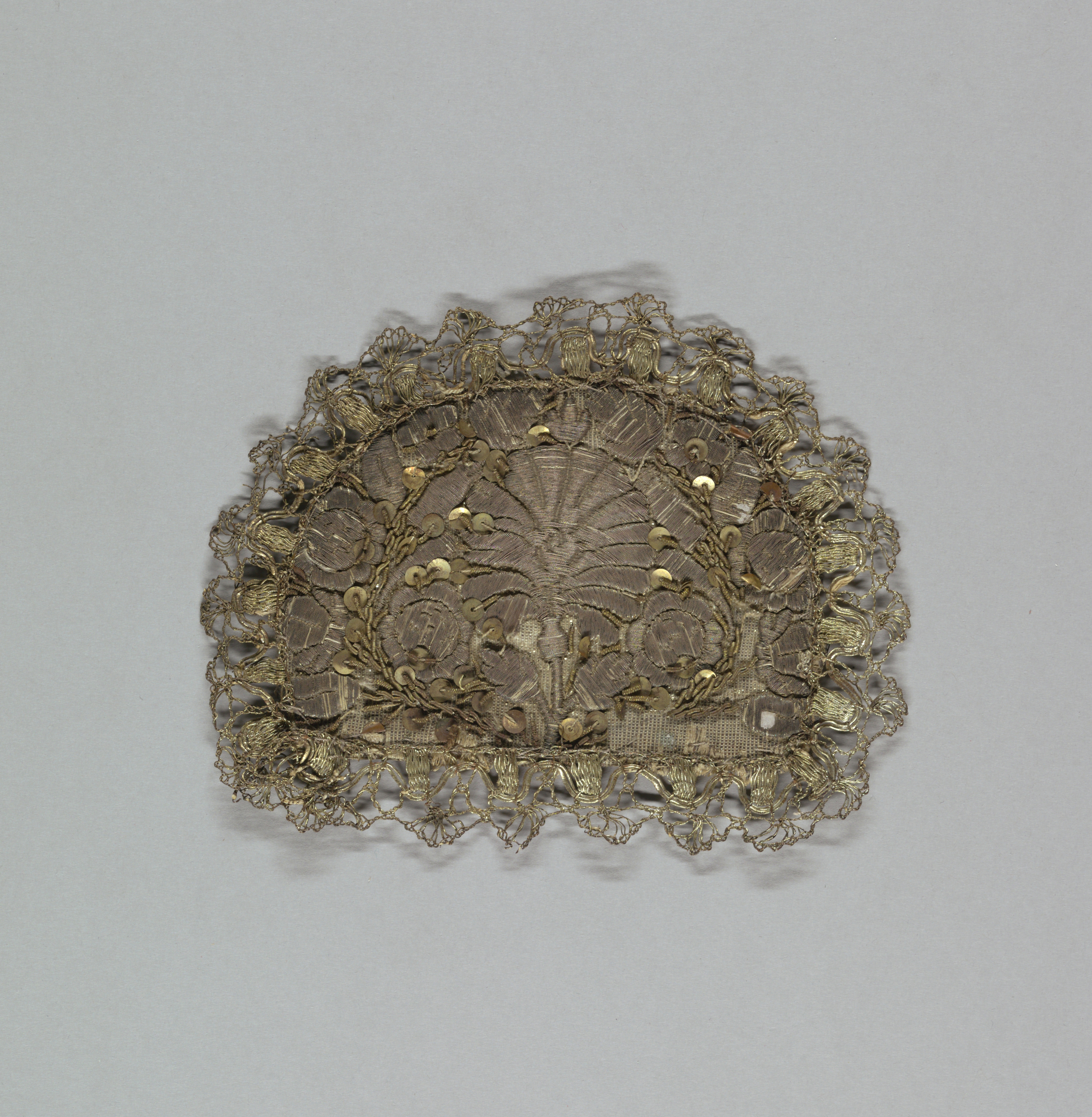
Cap Crown (Austria), 19th century (CH 18562325)

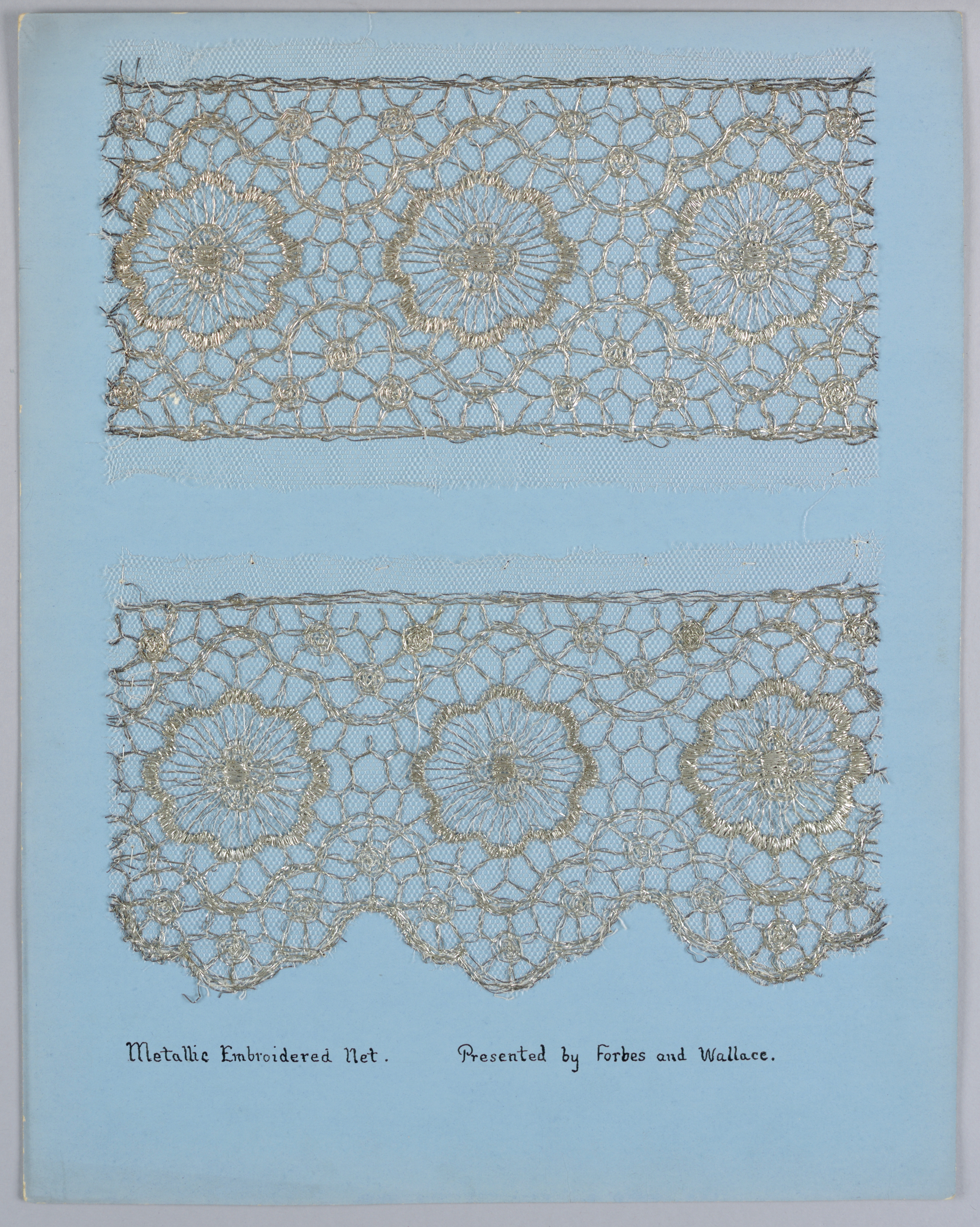
Machine-made metallic lace

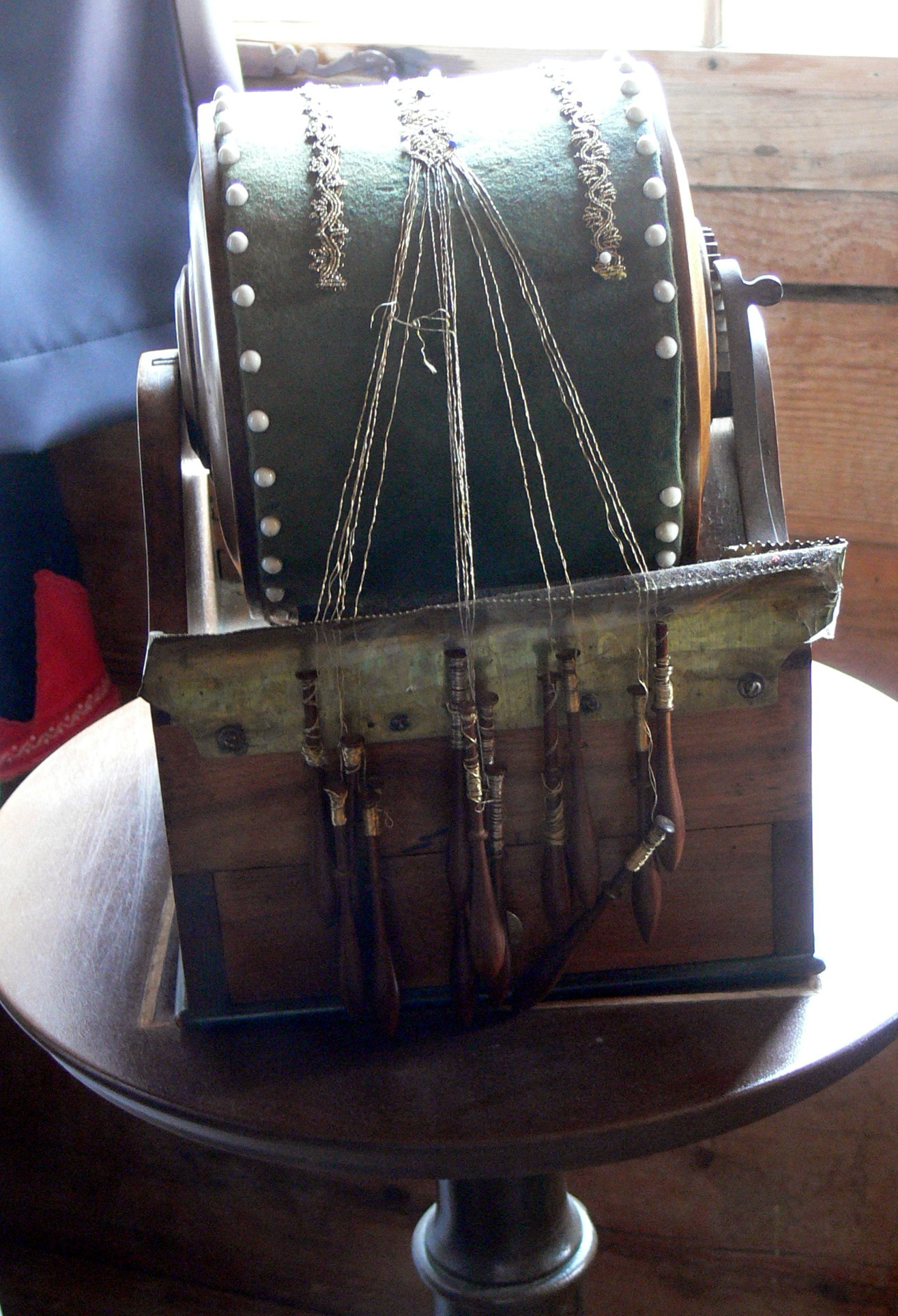
Metal lace in progress
