= Body odor =

Odor produced by a living animal

Body odor or body odour (BO) is the unique odor secreted by an animal or produced by microorganisms on an animal's outermost surfaces. It is present in all animals, and its intensity can be influenced by many factors (behavioral patterns, survival strategies). Body odor has a strong genetic basis, but it can also be strongly influenced by various factors, such as sex, diet, health, and medication. The body odor of human males plays an important role in human sexual attraction as a powerful indicator of genetic variation (MHC/HLA heterozygosity); significant evidence suggests that women are attracted to men whose body odor is different from theirs, indicating that they have immune genes that are different from their own, which may produce healthier offspring.

== Causes ==
In humans, the formation of body odors is caused by factors such as diet, sex, health, and medication, but the major contribution comes from bacterial activity on skin gland secretions. Humans have three types of sweat glands: eccrine sweat glands, apocrine sweat glands and sebaceous glands. Eccrine sweat glands are present from birth, while the latter two become activated during puberty. Among the different types of human skin glands, body odor is primarily the result of the apocrine sweat glands, which secrete the majority of chemical compounds that the skin flora metabolize into odorant substances. This happens mostly in the axillary (armpit) region, although the gland can also be found in the areola, anogenital region, and around the navel. In humans, the armpit regions seem more important than the genital region for body odor, which may be related to human bipedalism. The genital and armpit regions also contain springy hairs which help diffuse body odors.

The main components of human axillary odor are unsaturated or hydroxylated branched fatty acids with E-3-methylhex-2-enoic acid (E-3M2H) and 3-hydroxy-3-methylhexanoic acid (HMHA), sulfanylalkanols and particularly 3-methyl-3-sulfanylhexan-1-ol (3M3SH), and the odoriferous steroids androstenone (5α-androst-16-en-3-one) and androstenol (5α-androst-16-en-3α-ol). E-3M2H is bound and carried by two apocrine secretion odor-binding proteins, ASOB1 and ASOB2, to the skin surface.

Body odor is influenced by the actions of the skin flora, including members of Corynebacterium, which manufacture enzymes called lipases that break down the lipids in sweat to create smaller molecules like butyric acid. Greater bacteria populations of Corynebacterium jeikeium are found more in the armpits of men, whereas greater population numbers of Staphylococcus haemolyticus are found in the armpits of women. This causes male armpits to give off a rancid/cheese-like smell, whereas female armpits give off a more fruity/onion-like smell. Staphylococcus hominis is also known for producing thioalcohol compounds that contribute to odors. These smaller molecules smell, and give body odor its characteristic aroma. Propionic acid (propanoic acid) is present in many sweat samples. This acid is a breakdown product of some amino acids by propionibacteria, which thrive in the ducts of adolescent and adult sebaceous glands. Because propionic acid is chemically similar to acetic acid, with similar characteristics including odor, body odors may be identified as having a pungent, cheesy and vinegar-like smell although certain people might find it pleasant at lower concentrations. Isovaleric acid (3-methyl butanoic acid) is the other source of body odor as a result of actions of the bacteria Staphylococcus epidermidis, which is also present in several types of strong cheese.

Factors such as food, drink, gut microbiome, and genetics can affect body odor.

== Function ==
=== Animals ===
In many animals, body odor plays an important survival function. Strong body odor can be a warning signal for predators to stay away (such as porcupine stink), or it can also be a signal that the prey animal is unpalatable. For example, some animal species that feign death to survive (like opossums), in this state produce a strong body odor to deceive a predator that the prey animal has been dead for a long time and is already in the advanced stage of decomposing. Some animals with strong body odor are rarely attacked by most predators, although they can still be killed and eaten by birds of prey, which are tolerant of carrion odors.

Body odor is an important feature of animal physiology. It plays a different role in different animal species. For example, in some predator species that hunt by stalking (such as big and small cats), the absence of body odor is important, and they spend plenty of time and energy to keep their body free of odor. For other predators, such as those that hunt by visually locating prey and running for long distances after it (such as dogs and wolves), the absence of body odor is not critical. In most animals, body odor intensifies in moments of stress and danger.

==== Humans ====
In humans, body odor serves as a means of chemosensory signal communication between members of the species. These signals are called pheromones and they can be transmitted through a variety of mediums. The most common way that human pheromones are transmitted is through bodily fluids. Human pheromones are contained in sweat, semen, vaginal secretions, breast milk, and urine. The signals carried in these fluids serve a range of functions from reproductive signaling to infant socialization. Each person produces a unique spread of pheromones that can be identified by others. This differentiation allows the formation of sexual attraction and kinship ties to occur.

Sebaceous and apocrine glands become active at puberty. This, as well as many apocrine glands being close to the sex organs, points to a role related to mating. Sebaceous glands line the human skin while apocrine glands are located around body hairs. Compared to other primates, humans have extensive axillary hair and have many odor producing sources, in particular many apocrine glands. In humans, the apocrine glands have the ability to secrete pheromones. These steroid compounds are produced within the peroxisomes of the apocrine glands by enzymes such as mevalonate kinases.

==== Sexual selection ====
Pheromones are a factor seen in the mating selection and reproduction in humans. In women, the sense of olfaction is strongest around the time of ovulation, significantly stronger than during other phases of the menstrual cycle and also stronger than the sense in males. Pheromones can be used to deliver information about the major histocompatibility complex (MHC). The MHC in humans is referred to as the Human Leukocyte Antigen (HLA). Each type has a unique scent profile that can be utilized during the mating selection process. When selecting mates, women tend to be attracted to those that have different HLA-types from their own. This is thought to increase the strength of the family unit and increase the chances of survival for potential offspring.

Studies have suggested that people might be using odor cues associated with the immune system to select mates. Using a brain-imaging technique, Swedish researchers have shown that homosexual and heterosexual males' brains respond in different ways to two odors that may be involved in sexual arousal, and that homosexual men respond in the same way as heterosexual women, though it could not be determined whether this was cause or effect. When the study was expanded to include lesbian women, the results were consistent with previous findings – meaning that lesbian women were not as responsive to male-identified odors, while responding to female odors in a similar way as heterosexual males. According to the researchers, this research suggests a possible role for human pheromones in the biological basis of sexual orientation.

==== Kinship communication ====
Humans can olfactorily detect blood-related kin. Mothers can identify by body odor their biological children, but not their stepchildren. Preadolescent children can olfactorily detect their full siblings, but not half-siblings or step-siblings, and this might explain incest avoidance and the Westermarck effect. Babies can recognize their mothers by smell while mothers, fathers, and other relatives can identify a baby by smell. This connection between genetically similar family members is due to the habituation of familial pheromones. In the case of babies and mothers, this chemosensory information is primarily contained within breastmilk and the mother's sweat. When compared to that of strangers, babies are observed to have stronger neural connections with their mothers. This strengthened neurological connection allows for the biological development and socialization of the infant by their mother. Using these connections, the mother transmits olfactory signals to the infant which are then perceived and integrated.

In terms of biological functioning, olfactory signaling allows for functional breastfeeding to occur. In cases of effective latching, breastfed infants are able to locate their mother's nipples for feeding using the sensory information enclosed in their mother's body odor. While no specific human breast pheromones have been identified, studies compare the communication to that of the rabbit mammary pheromone 2MB2. The perception and integration of these signals is an evolutionary response that allows newborns to locate their source of nutrition. Signaling contains a level of precision that allows babies to differentiate their mother's breasts from that of other women. Once the baby recognizes the familiar olfactory signal, the behavioral response of latching follows. Over time the infant becomes habituated to their mother's breast pheromones which increases latch efficiency.

Beyond a biological function, a mother's body odor plays a role in developing a baby's social capabilities. The ability of an infant to evaluate the properties of human faces stems from the olfactory cues given from their mother. Frequent exposure to the pheromones exuded by their mother allows the connection between vision and smell to form in infants. This type of connection is only found between mothers and babies and over time it socializes the ability to recognize the features that distinguish human faces from inanimate objects.

==== Environmental threats ====
The connection between olfactory and visual cues has also been observed outside of familial relationships. Evolutionarily, body odor has been used to communicate messages about potentially dangerous stimuli in the environment. Body odor produced during particularly stressful situations can produce a cascade of reactions in the brain. Once the olfactory system is activated by a threatening stimuli, heightened activity in the amygdala and occipital cortex is triggered. This chain reaction serves to help assess the nature of the threat and increase chance of survival.

Humans have few olfactory receptor cells compared to dogs and few functional olfactory receptor genes compared to rats. This is in part due to a reduction of the size of the snout in order to achieve depth perception as well as other changes related to bipedalism. However, it has been argued that humans may have larger brain areas associated with olfactory perception compared to other species.

== Genes affecting body odor ==
World map of the distribution of the A allele of the single nucleotide polymorphism rs17822931 in the ABCC11 gene. The proportion of A alleles in each population is represented by the white area in each circle.

=== MHC ===
Body odor is influenced by major histocompatibility complex (MHC) molecules. These are genetically determined and play an important role in immunity of the organism. The vomeronasal organ contains cells sensitive to MHC molecules in a genotype-specific way.

Experiments on animals and volunteers have shown that potential sexual partners tend to be perceived more attractive if their MHC composition is substantially different. Married couples are more different regarding MHC genes than would be expected by chance. This behavior pattern promotes variability of the immune system of individuals in the population, thus making the population more robust against new diseases. Another reason may be to prevent inbreeding.

=== ABCC11 ===
The ABCC11 gene determines axillary body odor and earwax type. The loss of a functional ABCC11 gene is caused by a 538G>A single-nucleotide polymorphism, resulting in a loss of body odor in people who are specifically homozygous for it. Firstly, it affects apocrine sweat glands by reducing secretion of odorous molecules and its precursors. The lack of ABCC11 function results in a decrease of the odorant compounds 3M2H, HMHA, and 3M3SH via a strongly reduced secretion of the precursor amino-acid conjugates 3M2H–Gln, HMHA–Gln, and Cys–Gly–(S) 3M3SH; and a decrease of the odoriferous steroids androstenone and androstenol, possibly due to the reduced secretion of dehydroepiandrosterone sulfate (DHEAS) and dehydroepiandrosterone (DHEA), thought to be precursors for skin bacterial metabolism leading to the steroids' formation. Secondly, it is associated with a strongly reduced and atrophic size of apocrine sweat glands. Thirdly, it is associated with a decreased concentration of proteins, such as apocrine secretion odor-binding protein 2, in axillary sweat.

The non-functional ABCC11 allele is predominant among East Asians (80–95%), but very low among European and African populations (0–3%). Most of the world's population has the gene that codes for the wet-type earwax and average body odor; however, East Asians are more likely to inherit the allele associated with the dry-type earwax and a reduction in body odor. The reduction in body odor may be due to adaptation to colder climates by their ancient Northeast Asian ancestors.

Research suggests that ethnicity significantly influences human axillary odor production quantitatively, but the ABCC11 genotype alone does not account for the ethnic differences in scent, even though it plays a major role. For example, a 2016 study found that individuals with the same ABCC11 genotype exhibited differences in the levels of characteristic axillary odorants between ethnic groups (African American versus Caucasian), such as variations in the amounts of E-3M2H and 3H3M, two of many chemical compounds that contribute to odor. The authors of this study suggest this may be due to dietary variations among the individuals studied, while noting that more research with larger sample sizes is warranted. A separate study suggests that skin microbiome may contribute to observed compound differences between ethnic groups. One further study of ethnic groups in Brazil found that, when controlling for age and BMI, there were no ethnic differences in odorant compounds found in ear wax, which they directly contrast with previous results.

Research has indicated a strong association between people with axillary osmidrosis, a condition characterized by axillary odor, and the ABCC11-genotypes GG or GA in comparison to the genotype AA.

Frequencies of ABCC11 allele c.538 (One nonsynonymous SNP 538G > A)
Ethnic groups	Tribes or inhabitants	AA	GA	GG
Korean	Daegu city inhabitants	100%	0%	0%
Chinese	Northern and southern Han Chinese	80.8%	19.2%	0%
Mongolian	Khalkha tribe	75.9%	21.7%	2.4%
Japanese	Nagasaki people	69%	27.8%	3.2%
Thai	Central Thai in Bangkok	63.3%	20.4%	16.3%
Vietnamese	People from multiple regions	53.6%	39.2%	7.2%
Dravidian	Inhabitants of southern India	54.0%	17%	29%
Native American		30%	40%	30%
Filipino	Palawan	22.9%	47.9%	29.2%
Kazakh		20%	36.7%	43.3%
Russian		4.5%	40.2%	55.3%
White Americans	From CEPH families without the French and Venezuelans	1.2%	19.5%	79.3%
African	From various sub-Saharan nations	0%	8.3%	91.7%
African Americans		0%	0%	100%

Amino-acid conjugates of key human body odorants in sweat samples of panelists with different genotypes, determined by liquid chromatography-mass spectrometry
Genotype ABCC11	Sex	Ethnic population	Age	Net weight sweat (g)/2 pads	HMHA–Gln (μmol/2 pads)	3M2H–Gln (μmol/2 pads)	Cys–Gly conjugate of 3M3SH (μmol/2 pads)
AA	F	Chinese	27	2.05	ND	ND	ND
AA	F	Filipino	33	2.02	ND	ND	ND
AA	F	Korean	35	1.11	ND	ND	ND
GA	F	Filipino	31	1.47	1.23	0.17	Detectable, < 0.03 μmol
GA	F	Thai	25	0.90	0.89	0.14	Detectable, < 0.03 μmol
GA	F	German	25	1.64	0.54	0.10	Detectable, < 0.03 μmol
GG	F	Filipino	45	1.74	0.77	0.13	Detectable, < 0.03 μmol
GG	F	German	28	0.71	1.30	0.19	0.041
GG	F	German	33	1.23	1.12	0.16	0.038

* ND indicates that no detectable peak is found on the [M+H]+ ion trace of the selected analyte at the correct retention time.
* HMHA: 3-hydroxy-3-methyl-hexanoic acid; 3M2H: (E)-3-methyl-2-hexenoic acid; 3M3SH: 3-methyl-3-sulfanylhexan-1-ol.

== Other factors affecting body odor ==
=== Age ===
As seen in non-human animals such as mice, black-tailed deer, rabbits, otters, and owl monkeys, body odor contains age-related signals that these animals can detect and process. Similarly, humans have been seen to distinguish age-related information from body odor, particularly relating to odors of those of old age. In a study determining if there is a difference between the body odor of individuals of various ages, three groups were studied: those aged 20–30, aged 45–55, and aged 75–95, corresponding to young age, middle-aged, and old age, respectively. This study determined that individuals could distinguish between odors of various ages and group odors of old age, suggesting that there are certain chemical differences in age resulting in "age-dependent odor characteristics".

Another study evaluated the components of body odor in participants aged 26 through 75 using headspace gas chromatography and mass spectroscopy. This study demonstrated that in individuals 40 years or older, 2-Nonenal, an unsaturated aldehyde producing a greasy and grassy odor, was detected in increasing concentrations of those individuals. The detection of increasing amounts of 2-Nonenal in individuals 40 years or older suggested that 2-Nonenal contributes to the deteriorating body odor seen with aging.

=== Diseases ===
In mammals, body odor can also be used as a symptom of disease. One's body odor is completely unique to themselves, similar to a fingerprint, and can change due to sexual life, genetics, age and diet. Body odor, however, can be used as an indication for disease. For example, typically, human urine contains 95% water, however, for a person with an abnormal amount of blood sugar, their urine becomes more concentrated with glucose. Therefore, if a person's body odor or urine smells unusually fruity or sweet, that can be a sign of diabetes. Additionally, an ammonia smell that occurs in one's body, urine, or breath could also be an indicator of kidney disease. Typically, the liver converts ammonia to urea because ammonia has a high level of toxicity. The kidneys are responsible for removing waste, such as urea, out from the body. However, if the kidneys are not functioning properly, this urea is kept as ammonia, causing the urine and even one's breath to smell like ammonia. In conclusion, body odor could be used as a helpful indicator of disease, especially when it suddenly deviates from normal.

== Alterations ==
Body odor may be reduced or prevented or even aggravated by using deodorants, antiperspirants, disinfectants, underarm liners, triclosan, special soaps or foams with antiseptic plant extracts such as ribwort and liquorice, chlorophyllin ointments and sprays topically, and chlorophyllin supplements internally. Although body odor is commonly associated with hygiene practices, its presentation can be affected by changes in diet as well as the other factors. Skin spectrophotometry analysis found that males who consumed more fruits and vegetables were significantly associated with more pleasant smelling sweat, which was described as "floral, fruity, sweet and medicinal qualities".

=== Industry ===
As many as 90% of Americans and 92% of teenagers use antiperspirants or deodorants. In 2014, the global market for deodorants was estimated at US$13 billion with a compound annual growth rate of 5.62% between 2015 and 2020.

== Medical conditions ==
Osmidrosis or bromhidrosis is defined by a foul odor due to a water-rich environment that supports bacteria, which is caused by an abnormal increase in perspiration (hyperhidrosis). Axillary osmidrosis, in the axillary region (underarms), can be particularly strong.. The condition is also named medically as apocrine bromhidrosis, ozochrotia, fetid sweat, body smell, or malodorous sweating. An estimated 4.8% of people live with uncontrollable sweating; the International Hyperhidrosis Society (IHS) was founded in the US in 2003 to support them.

=== Treatment ===
If body odor is affecting a person's quality of life consulting a physician may be helpful. A doctor could recommend prescription antiperspirants containing aluminum chloride, a chemical agent that helps temporarily block sweat pores, thereby reducing sweat production. Deodorant is another treatment for body odor; it reduces odor but does not reduce sweating. Deodorants usually contain alcohol, an anti-bacterial, and perfumes which help to mask odor. Severe body odor can be treated by endoscopic thoracic sympathectomy, a surgical procedure cutting nerves that control sweating, but with the risk of harming other nerves.

=== Prevention ===
Bathing daily with antibacterial soap reduces the amount of bacteria on the skin. Deodorant or antiperspirant applied after bathing may reduce further sweating.

Trimethylaminuria (TMAU), also known as fish odor syndrome or fish malodor syndrome, is a rare metabolic disorder where trimethylamine is released in the person's sweat, urine, and breath, giving off a strong fishy odor or strong body odor.

== See also ==
- Drug resistance
- Foot odor
- Halitosis (bad breath)
- Old person smell
- Olfactory fatigue
- Pheromone
- Sweat gland
