= Peter Orris =

American physician

- Born: 1945 (age 80–81); Los Angeles, California
- Occupations: Professor and Chief of Occupational and Environmental Medicine, University of Illinois at Chicago

Peter Orris (born 1945 in Los Angeles, California) is an American political activist, Medical Doctor and Professor and Chief of Occupational and Environmental Medicine at the University of Illinois at Chicago Hospital and Health Sciences System. Raised in New York City by his parents, Trudy and Leo Orris, Orris was involved with the civil rights movement from age eleven. While known for his work in the field of medicine, Orris is also known for his work in the Civil Rights Movement.

== American Civil Rights Movement ==
External videos
- "Interview with Peter Orris" conducted in 1986 for the Eyes on the Prize documentary in which he discusses his involvement with the Student Nonviolent Coordinating Committee and voter registration drives as part of Freedom Summer in Mississippi.

Raised by Trudy and Leo Orris, Orris was involved in several aspects of the Civil Rights Movement during his youth. His first activism within the Civil Rights Movement started at age eleven, where he participated in the Prayer Pilgrimage for Freedom, a nonviolent march which recognized the Brown v. Board of Education Supreme Court's decision, making segregation in schools illegal. As a child, Orris also participated in a political activist group called Students for a Sane Nuclear Policy in order to protest atom bomb testing. In eight grade, Orris participated in the first Youth March for Integrated Schools. In ninth grade, Orris organized a bus that took students from his high school to the second Youth March for Intergraded Schools in 1957. Later in high school, Orris would become an intern for the National Headquarters of the March on Washington for Jobs and Freedom.

While studying biology at Harvard University, Orris continued to be a political activist with several organizations fighting for civil rights, including Student Nonviolent Coordinating Committee, the school's socialist club, Students for a Democratic Society (in which he was a leader) and the Civil Rights Coordinating Committee Orris was a master of ceremonies for a conference in Chicago which focused on resisting the draft for the Vietnam War. While a freshman in college, Orris participated in Freedom Summer in Holmes County, Mississippi. Orris was the second youngest volunteer with the Freedom Summer coordinated in large part by the Student Nonviolent Coordinating Committee (SNCC). Orris went through two weeks of training in Oxford, Ohio, immediately after the murders of Chaney, Goodman, and Schwerner. Orris was trained by civil rights leaders such as Bob Moses. Once in Holmes County, Mississippi, Orris focused on voter registration campaigns. Orris brought walkie talkies down to Mississippi with him as a means of communication with his fellow SNCC workers in rural Mississippi, unbeknownst to SNCC headquarters. After SNCC found out this was effective, Orris worked with an engineer on behalf of SNCC to install two-way radios in all SNCC cars and in farms which had no other means of communication. They installed 50 radio communication devices while in Mississippi. Despite ongoing violence within the region, no communicators were broken, and no full-time SNCC staff members in Mississippi were killed that summer.

While working in Freedom Summer, Orris was arrested for his work in the Civil Rights Movement, and was held in jail for ten days in a LeFlore County, Mississippi jail; charges included disturbing the peace and picketing at a courthouse. While in jail, he planned and staged a hunger strike for four or five days. Orris also participated in the Democratic National Convention where he and Fannie Lou Hamer, Unita Blackwell, Ed King, Victoria Gray Adams and Aaron Henry staged a sit in at the Democratic National Convention in hopes to receive delegate seats on behalf of the Mississippi Freedom Democratic Party. While unsuccessful, the sit-in done by the Mississippi Freedom Democratic Party left longstanding impacts on the civil rights movement.

== Current activism ==
Orris is a proponent for single-payer healthcare. In Chicago, Orris called for the Chicago Medical Society to study the creation of single-payer healthcare plans. In 2004, Orris attended the 46th annual Eugene V. Debs- Norman Thomas- Michael Harrington Dinner, which was titled "Building the Dump Bush Movement. In 2015, Orris signed a letter with other doctors in support of hunger strikers with the Coalition to revitalize Dyett High School, a group with was working to make the Chicago School System work towards "Global Leadership and Green Technology" within Dyett High School. Orris was also involved in Greenpeace, as well as a faculty advisor of the Physicians for a National Health Plan Chapter at the University of Illinois Chicago. In 2015, Orris spoke at "Beyond the Affordable Care Act: Lessons from Other Countries", an event ran by the Healthcare Access Coalition. Orris has been an advisor to a number of international health organizations, including the World Health Organization, Pan American Health Associations, and Healthcare without Harm.

== Education ==
After graduating from Harvard with a degree in Biology, Orris continued his education at Yale University, graduating with a degree in Public Health in 1970. Later, he would continue to Chicago Medical School, where he would graduate with a Doctorate of Medicine in 1975. Orris also held residencies at John H. Stroger Jr. Hospital of Cook County for internal medicine and preventive medicine. Orris is also certified in Occupational Medicine by the American Board of Preventive Medicine.

== Career ==
Orris has held a number of positions in the medical field, including Regional NIOSH/CDC Medical Officer for the Midwest, Medical Director of the Mount Sinai Medical Center and Northwest Community Hospital occupational medical programs, and physician in the Department of Medicine at Cook County Hospital.

Orris was also a representative of the World Federation of Public Health Associations at the second session of the International Conference on Chemicals Management with the World Health Organization.

Orris is currently a Professor and Chief of Occupational and Environmental Medicine at the University of Illinois in Chicago Hospital and Health Sciences System. In addition, he served as a collaborative researcher for Healthcare without Harm (US and Canada Branch). Orris also serves as the Board President of the Chicago Organizing Physicians for Social Responsibility.

Specialty projects Orris has worked with include studying Dioxin levels in Lake Charles, Maryland, where he studied the effect Dioxin had on ADD and ADHD within the area. While working with the World Health Organization, he provided technical guidance in replacing mercury based thermometers with different ones. Orris also authored the World Federation of Public Health Association's May 2000 report on "Persistent Organic Pollutants and Human Health", which speaks on the dangers of persistent organic pollutants. Orris has worked with a number of small communities, studying pollutants and environmental concerns, including a study in New Sarpy, Louisiana, where he studied the relationship between chemical exposure and illness within the neighborhood.

Orris was an attendee of every negotiating session of a global treaty to eliminate mercury from thermometers globally, which has resulted in the phasing out of mercury-based thermometers by 2020.

== Awards and honors ==
Orris has received a number of awards for his activism and work in the medical community, including the Paul Cornely Award at the Health Activist Dinner, a keynote speaker at the 2007 conference of the Asbestos Disease Awareness Organization, and a Lifetime Achievement Award for Excellence in Global Health from the 5th World Congress on Public Health in 2017.
