= Old person smell =

Odor of elderly humans

Old person smell is the characteristic odor of elderly humans. Like many other animal species, human odor undergoes distinct stages based on chemical changes initiated through the aging process. Research suggests that this enables humans to determine the suitability of potential partners based on age, in addition to other factors.

== Biology ==
One study suggested that old person smell may be the result of 2-nonenal, an unsaturated aldehyde which is associated with human body odor alterations during aging. Another study failed to detect 2-nonenal at all, but found significantly increased concentrations of benzothiazole, dimethyl sulfone, and nonanal on older subjects. There are also other hypotheses, such as change of the monounsaturated fatty acid composition of skin surface lipids and the increase of lipid peroxides associated with aging.

In 2012, the Monell Chemical Senses Center published a press release claiming that the human ability to identify information such as age, illness, and genetic suitability from odor is responsible for the distinctive "old man smell". Sensory neuroscientist Johan Lundström stated, "Elderly people have a discernible underarm odor that younger people consider to be fairly neutral and not very unpleasant."

== In Japan ==
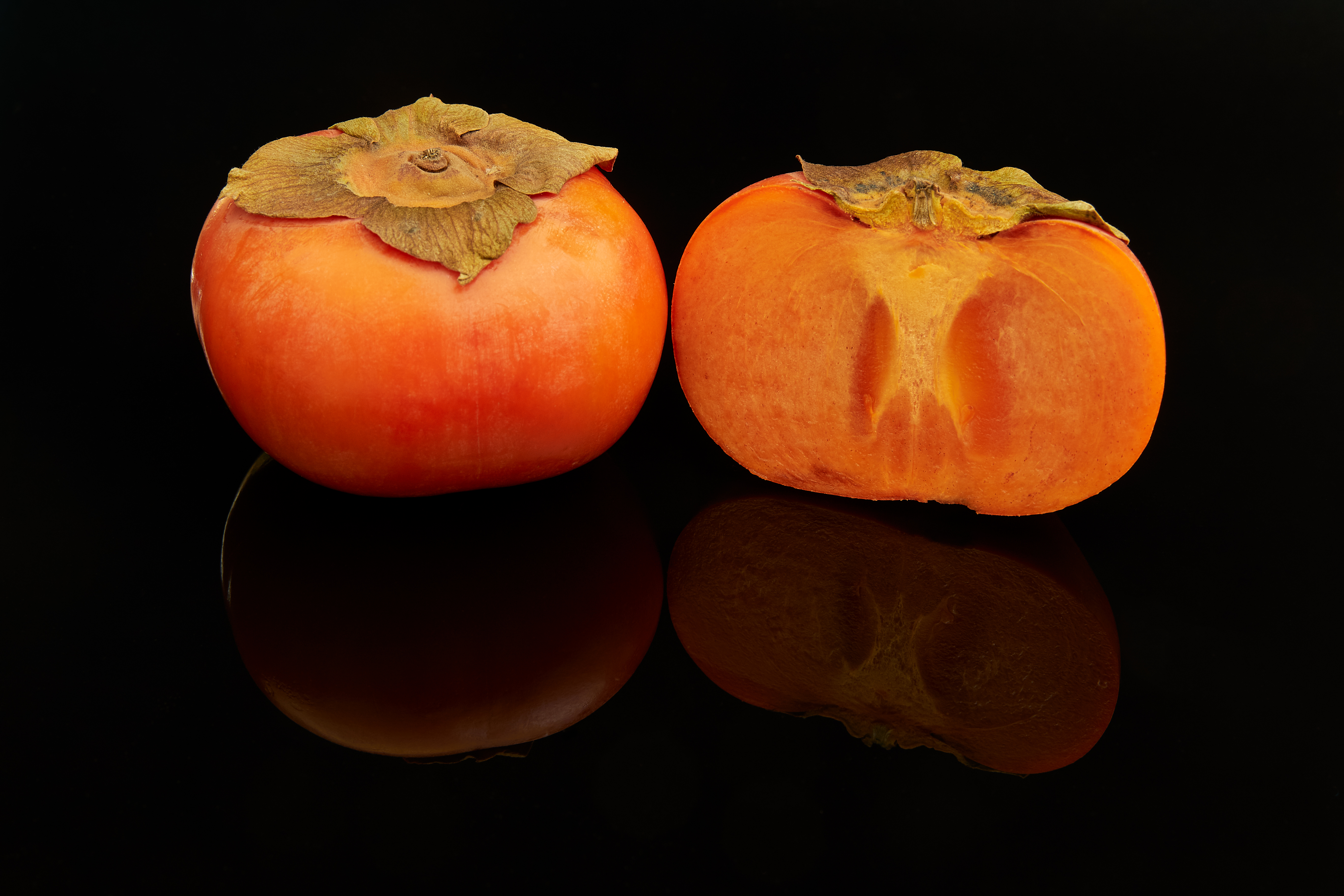
Japanese persimmon extract is used in soap to counter old age smell

Old person smell is known as kareishū (加齢臭) in Japan, where much social value is placed on personal grooming, and specific upmarket odor-eliminating soaps are targeted at more elderly consumers.

== See also ==
- Body odor
- Halitosis (bad breath)
