= ABCC11 =

Protein found in humans

Identifiers
- Aliases: ABCC11, ATP-binding cassette, sub-family C (CFTR/MRP), member 11, EWWD, MRP8, WW, ATP binding cassette subfamily C member 11, ATP-binding cassette transporter sub-family C member 1
- External IDs: OMIM: 607040; GeneCards: ABCC11
Enzyme activity
EC #	BRENDA	ExPASy	KEGG	MetaCyc
7.6.2.2	↗	↗	↗	↗
7.6.2.3	↗	↗	↗	↗

Gene location (Human)
Chr.	Chromosome 16 (human)
Band	16q12.1	Start	48,165,773 bp
Band	16q12.1	End	48,247,568 bp
RNA expression pattern
Bgee	Human / Mouse (ortholog); Top expressed in: testicle; right lobe of liver; gonad; left testis; right uterine tube; right testis; sural nerve; prefrontal cortex; epithelium of lactiferous gland; lactiferous duct / n/a; More reference expression data
BioGPS	n/a
Gene ontology
Molecular function	nucleotide binding; organic anion transmembrane transporter activity; ATPase activity; ATP binding; purine nucleotide transmembrane transporter activity; ATPase-coupled inorganic anion transmembrane transporter activity; ATPase-coupled transmembrane transporter activity
Cellular component	integral component of membrane; integral component of plasma membrane; extracellular exosome; membrane; vacuole; vacuolar membrane; plasma membrane; cytoplasmic vesicle membrane; cytoplasmic vesicle
Biological process	purine nucleotide transport; transmembrane transport; organic anion transport; transport
Sources:Amigo / QuickGO
Orthologs
Databases	NCBI: entry; OMA: entry
Species	Human	Mouse
Entrez	85320	n/a
Ensembl	ENSG00000121270	n/a
UniProt	Q96J66	n/a
RefSeq (mRNA)	NM_032583; NM_033151; NM_145186; NM_001370496; NM_001370497	n/a
RefSeq (protein)	NP_115972; NP_149163; NP_660187; NP_001357425; NP_001357426 NP_115972.2; NP_149163.2	n/a
Location (UCSC)	Chr 16: 48.17 – 48.25 Mb	n/a
PubMed search		n/a
- Wikidata
View/Edit Human

ATP-binding cassette transporter sub-family C member 11, also MRP8 (Multidrug Resistance-Related Protein 8), is a membrane transporter that exports certain molecules from inside a cell. It is a protein that in humans is encoded by gene ABCC11.

The gene is responsible for determination of human cerumen type (wet or dry ear wax) and presence of underarm osmidrosis (odor associated with sweat caused by apocrine secretion), and is associated with colostrum secretion.

== Function ==
The protein encoded by this gene is a member of the superfamily of ATP-binding cassette (ABC) transporters. ABC proteins transport various molecules across extra- and intra-cellular membranes. ABC genes are divided into seven distinct subfamilies (ABC1, MDR/TAP, MRP, ALD, OABP, GCN20, White). The ABCC11 transporter is a member of the MRP subfamily which is involved in multi-drug resistance. The product of this gene participates in physiological processes involving bile acids, conjugated steroids, and cyclic nucleotides. In addition, a single nucleotide polymorphism (SNP) in this gene is responsible for determination of human earwax type and presence of underarm odour. This gene and family member ABCC12 are determined to be derived by duplication and are both localized to chromosome 16q12.1. Multiple alternatively spliced transcript variants have been described for this gene.

== Molecular genetics ==
Location of ABCC11 with its 30 exons on chromosome 16. The important single nucleotide polymorphism (SNP) 538G → A is located on exon 4.

The ABCC11 gene is present in the human genome as two alleles, differing in one nucleotide also known as a single nucleotide polymorphism (SNP). A SNP in the ABCC11 gene on chromosome 16 at base position 538 of either a guanine or adenine determines two distinct groups of phenotypes. These respectively code for glycine and arginine in the gene's protein product. Dominant inheritance of the GG or GA genotype is observed while the AA genotype is recessive. The phenotypes expressed by the genotypes include cerumen type (wet or dry ear wax), osmidrosis (odor associated with sweat caused by excessive apocrine secretion), and possibly breast cancer risk, although there is ongoing debate on whether there is a real correlation of the wet ear wax phenotype to breast cancer susceptibility. The GG or GA genotype produces the wet ear wax phenotype (sticky and brown colored) and acrid sweat odor and is the dominant allele. Note this phenotype requires only the presence of one guanine. The homozygous recessive AA genotype produces the dry ear wax phenotype (dry and flaky) and mildly odored sweat.

The alleles containing a guanine produce a protein that is glycosylated but alleles containing an adenine are not glycosylated. The resulting protein is only partially degraded by proteasomes. This effect is localized to ceruminous gland membranes. Because the adenine containing allele protein product is only partially degraded, the remaining functional protein is located on the cell surface membrane which ABCC11 gene's role in sweat odor is likely in part due to the quantitative dosage of ABCC11 protein.

From an evolutionary perspective, the implications of cerumen type on fitness are unknown. However, odorless sweat in ancient Northern Eurasian populations has been postulated to have an adaptive advantage for cold weather. In some nonhuman mammals, mating signals via release of an odor enhanced by increased apocrine secretion may be a factor in sexual selection.

Physical human traits that are controlled by a single gene are uncommon. Most human characteristics are controlled by multiple genes (polygenes); ABCC11 is a peculiar example of a gene with unambiguous phenotypes that is controlled by a SNP. Additionally, it is considered a pleiotropic gene.

== Demographics ==
World map of the distribution of the A allele of the single nucleotide polymorphism rs17822931 in the ABCC11 gene. The proportion of A alleles in each population is represented by the white area in each circle.

The history of the migration of humans can be traced back using the ABCC11 gene alleles. The variation between ear wax in ethnicities around the world are specifically due to the ABCC11 gene alleles.

The nonfunctional ABCC11 538G>A (rs17822931) allele exhibits marked geographic variation in frequency. It is highly prevalent in East Asian populations, where the majority of individuals carry at least one copy of the variant and consequently display reduced axillary odor and dry earwax. In contrast, the functional allele predominates in most African, European, and South Asian populations, where wet earwax and axillary odor are more common. This distribution represents one of the most pronounced population differences known for a common human genetic variant and has been suggested to reflect historical positive selection in East Asia.

Some hypotheses propose that the A allele of ABCC11, rs17822931, may confer adaptive advantages in colder climates. The mutation allows for better body heat preservation because it is characterized by diminished sweat gland activity. The mutation emerged approximately 44,000 years ago in a lineage related to the Ust'-Ishim man in the Omsk Oblast of western Siberia. In East Asia, the derived allele appears approximately 40,000 years ago in Northern China among individuals related to the Tianyuan man. In North America, the derived allele appears approximately 12,000 years ago. The gene may have spread as a result of it being a beneficial adaption or through an evolutionary neutral mutation mechanism that went through genetic drift events, or through sexual selection.

An analysis of ancient DNA from Eastern European hunter gatherers, Scandinavian Hunter Gatherers, Western Hunter Gatherers and Early European Farmers found that the derived allele of ABCC11 associated with dry earwax and reduced body odor was absent in all European hunter gatherers, except for a Western Hunter Gatherer from Mesolithic central Europe. The derived allele was absent in the Paleolithic hunter gatherer Kostenki 14, who is deeply related to Ancient North Eurasians.

The frequency of alleles for dry ear wax is most concentrated in East Asia; most notably China, Japan, Korea, and Mongolia. The allele frequency is highest among the northern Han Chinese and Koreans; followed by Mongols, southern Han Chinese, and Yamato Japanese, respectively. The frequency is low among the Ryukyuans and Ainu compared to other East Asians. As the mutation was already present in the Tianyuan man of Northern China, this suggests the genetic continuity of the variant in East Asia for the last 40,000 years. After East Asians, the Indigenous peoples of the Americas exhibit the highest frequency of this mutation. The derived allele is not rare in South Asia, with 54% of Dravidian people from Tamil Nadu carrying an AA genotype. A downward gradient of dry ear wax allele phenotypes can be drawn from northern China to southern Asia and an east–west gradient can also be drawn from eastern Siberia to western Europe. The allele frequencies within ethnicities continued to be maintained because the ABCC11 gene is inherited as a haplotype, a group of genes or alleles that tend to be inherited as a single unit.

The amount of volatile organic compounds (VOCs) in ear wax was found to be related to variation in ABCC11 genotype, which in turn is dependent on ethnic origin. In particular, the rs17822931 genotype, which is especially prevalent in East Asians, is correlated with lower VOC levels. However, VOC levels were not found to vary significantly qualitatively nor quantitatively for most organic compounds by racial group after Bonferroni corrections, suggesting that it does not result in ethnic differences.

== See also ==
- ATP-binding cassette transporter
- Body odor
