= 2-Nonenal =

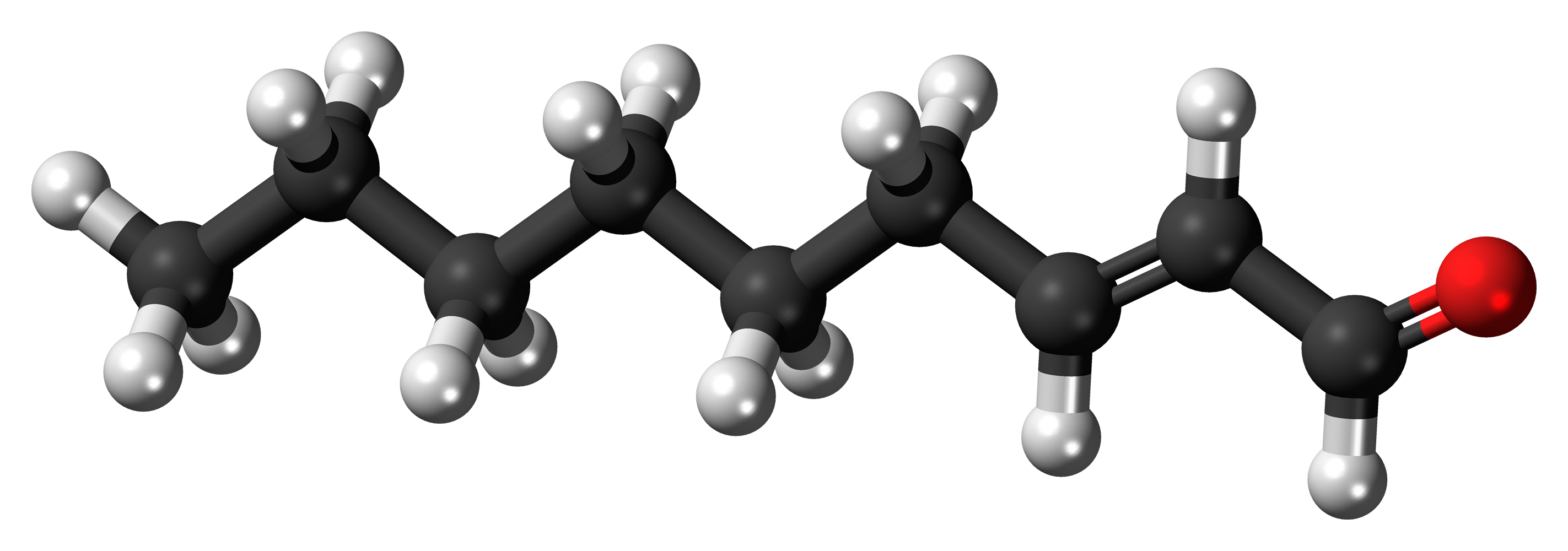

Names
- Preferred IUPAC name Non-2-enal

Identifiers
CAS Number	18829-56-6 (trans); 60784-31-8 (cis); 2463-53-8 (cis/trans mixture)
3D model (JSmol)	Interactive image
ChEBI	CHEBI:142592
ChEMBL	ChEMBL450072
ChemSpider	4446456
ECHA InfoCard	100.017.784
EC Number	242-609-6 (trans); 219-562-5
PubChem CID	5283335
UNII	8VEO649985 (trans); ARM1W3309Z (cis); 93C6BZW2TV (cis/trans mixture)
CompTox Dashboard (EPA)	DTXSID3047219
- InChI: InChI=1S/C9H16O/c1-2-3-4-5-6-7-8-9-10/h7-9H,2-6H2,1H3/b8-7+ Key: BSAIUMLZVGUGKX-BQYQJAHWSA-N; InChI=1/C9H16O/c1-2-3-4-5-6-7-8-9-10/h7-9H,2-6H2,1H3/b8-7+ Key: BSAIUMLZVGUGKX-BQYQJAHWBS
- SMILES: O=C/C=C/CCCCCC (E) O=C/C=\/CCCCCC (Z) O=CC=CCCCCCC (unspecified)

Properties
Chemical formula	C_{9}H_{16}O
Molar mass	140.226 g·mol^{−1}
Appearance	Colorless liquid
Boiling point	188.00 to 190.00 °C (370.40 to 374.00 °F; 461.15 to 463.15 K) at 760.00 mmHg

Hazards
- GHS labelling
Pictograms	(GHS07: Exclamation mark)
Signal word	Warning
Hazard statements	H315
Precautionary statements	P264, P280, P302+P352, P321, P332+P313, P362
NFPA 704 (fire diamond)	1 2 0
Flash point	79 °C (174 °F; 352 K)
Safety data sheet (SDS)	External MSDS
- Except where otherwise noted, data are given for materials in their standard state (at 25 °C [77 °F], 100 kPa). verify (what is ?) Infobox references

2-Nonenal is an unsaturated aldehyde. The colorless liquid is an important aroma component of aged beer and buckwheat, and is insoluble in water.

2-Nonenal reacts with the Wittig reagent methylenetriphenylphosphorane to give hexyl-1,3-butadiene.

== Odor characteristics ==
The odour of the mixed isomers is perceived as "fatty, green, waxy, cucumber, melon". The odour of the (Z)-isomer is "orris, fatty, waxy, cucumber" whilst that of the (E)-isomer is "fatty, green, cucumber, aldehydic". Its odor has been associated with human body odor alterations during aging.

== See also ==
- trans,cis-2,6-Nonadienal - Structurally related, aroma of cucumber
- 6-Nonenal - Structurally related, aroma of cantaloupe
