= Trans-3-Methyl-2-hexenoic acid =

trans-3-Methyl-2-hexenoic acid

Names
- Preferred IUPAC name (2E)-3-Methylhex-2-enoic acid
- Other names E3M2H; 3M2H; TMHA; MHA; C7:2 (Lipid numbers)

Identifiers
CAS Number	27960-21-0
3D model (JSmol)	Interactive image
ChEBI	CHEBI:144845
ChemSpider	4947706
ECHA InfoCard	100.225.656
PubChem CID	6443739
UNII	Q98FU4WJ65
CompTox Dashboard (EPA)	DTXSID701020850
- InChI: InChI=1S/C7H12O2/c1-3-4-6(2)5-7(8)9/h5H,3-4H2,1-2H3,(H,8,9)/b6-5+ Key: NTWSIWWJPQHFTO-AATRIKPKSA-N; InChI=1S/C7H12O2/c1-3-4-6(2)5-7(8)9/h5H,3-4H2,1-2H3,(H,8,9)/b6-5+ Key: NTWSIWWJPQHFTO-AATRIKPKSA-N
- SMILES: CCCC(=CC(=O)O)C

Properties
Chemical formula	C_{7}H_{12}O_{2}
Molar mass	128.171 g·mol^{−1}
Density	0.97 g/cm^{3}
Melting point	−3.4 °C (25.9 °F; 269.8 K)
Boiling point	225.2 °C (437.4 °F; 498.3 K)

Hazards
Flash point	132 °C (270 °F; 405 K)
- Except where otherwise noted, data are given for materials in their standard state (at 25 °C [77 °F], 100 kPa). (what is ?) Infobox references

trans-3-Methyl-2-hexenoic acid (TMHA) is an unsaturated short-chain fatty acid that occurs in sweat secreted by the axillary (underarm) apocrine glands of Caucasians and some Asians.

Hexanoic acids such as TMHA have a hircine odor. Of the fatty acids contributing to Caucasian men's underarm odor, TMHA has the most prominent odor.

== TMHA and schizophrenia ==
It has long been claimed that schizophrenia patients exhibit a particular peculiar body odor, and it has been postulated the odor may be caused by underlying metabolic abnormalities associated with the condition, among other factors. Initial studies identified the causal component as TMHA, but subsequent studies failed to reproduce such results, with subsequent researchers suggesting the initial research may have had misidentified impurities in samples as TMHA due to poor methodology. However, a 2007 study found schizophrenia patients to have reduced olfactory sensitivity to TMHA, possibly indicating sensory habituation; the decreased ability to smell the substance due to the presence of the substance as a constant component of subjects' own sweat and body odor. Furthermore, the researchers noted a positive association between reduced ability to smell TMHA and greater severity of disorganised and negative symptoms.

An allusion to TMHA and its purported link to the smell of the mentally ill is made in the 1996 David Foster Wallace novel, Infinite Jest, the 1988 Thomas Harris novel The Silence of the Lambs, and the 2025 comic book Absolute Martian Manhunter #2 by Deniz Camp and Javier Rodríguez.
