= Outline of dyslexia =

Learning disability that affects reading or writing, or both

The following outline is provided as an overview of and topical guide to dyslexia:

Dyslexia, also known as "word blindness", is a learning disability that affects either reading or writing. Different people are affected to different degrees. Problems may include difficulties in spelling words, reading quickly, writing words, "sounding out" words in the head, pronouncing words when reading aloud and understanding what one reads. Often these difficulties are first noticed at school. The difficulties are involuntary, and people with this disorder have a normal desire to learn. People with dyslexia have higher rates of attention deficit hyperactivity disorder (ADHD), developmental language disorders, and difficulties with numbers.

Dyslexia is believed to be caused by the interaction of genetic and environmental factors. Some cases run in families. Dyslexia that develops due to a traumatic brain injury, stroke, or dementia is sometimes called "acquired dyslexia" or alexia. The underlying mechanisms of dyslexia result from differences within the brain's language processing. Dyslexia is diagnosed through a series of tests of memory, vision, spelling, and reading skills. Dyslexia is separate from reading difficulties caused by hearing or vision problems or by insufficient teaching or opportunity to learn.

== Description of dyslexia ==
Dyslexia can be described as the following:

- Learning disability - A neurological condition that affects reading, writing, and spelling skills.

== Types of dyslexia ==
- Surface dyslexia - Difficulty with whole-word recognition and irregular word spelling.
  - Orthographies and dyslexia - How dyslexia manifests in different writing systems.
- Deep dyslexia - Semantic errors in reading, often substituting related words.
- Acquired dyslexia (alexia) - Reading difficulties resulting from brain injury.
  - Phonological dyslexia - Difficulty with letter-sound connections and unfamiliar words.

== History of dyslexia ==
- History of dyslexia research - Timeline of scientific understanding and approaches to dyslexia.

== Causes and theories of dyslexia ==
- Theories of dyslexia
  - Perceptual noise exclusion hypothesis
  - Phonological deficit hypothesis - Theory suggesting difficulties in processing speech sounds.

== Symptoms, and diagnosing dyslexia ==
- Characteristics of dyslexia - Common signs and symptoms used for identification.
- Rapid automatized naming - Test measuring ability to quickly name familiar objects.

== Treatment of dyslexia ==
- Management of dyslexia - Strategies and interventions to support individuals with dyslexia.

== Dyslexia research ==
Research in dyslexia - Current scientific investigations and findings.

- Orthographies and dyslexia - Studies on dyslexia across different writing systems.

== Dyslexia in popular culture ==
- Dyslexia in popular culture - Representations of dyslexia in media and literature.

== Dyslexia organizations ==
- Decoding Dyslexia - A grassroots movement advocating for improved awareness and educational support for students with dyslexia in the U.S. and beyond.
- Dyslexia Action - Provides support, assessment, and training services for individuals with dyslexia in the UK.
- International Dyslexia Association - A non-profit organization focused on research, education, and advocacy for dyslexia worldwide.
- Learning Ally - nation-wide non-profit volunteer organization in the U.S. that produces and maintains a library of educational accessible audiobooks for people with learning-related disabilities.

== Dyslexia-related journals ==
- Annals of Dyslexia - A peer-reviewed academic journal published by the International Dyslexia Association.
- Dyslexia (journal) - A quarterly peer-reviewed scientific journal covering research on dyslexia and other learning difficulties.
- Journal of Learning Disabilities - A peer-reviewed academic journal that publishes research on learning disabilities, including dyslexia.
- Reading and Writing - An interdisciplinary journal that publishes research on literacy, including studies on dyslexia.

== Persons influential in dyslexia ==
- Samuel Torrey Orton - American neuropsychiatrist who pioneered the study of learning disabilities and developed the Orton-Gillingham approach for reading instruction.
- Anna Gillingham - American educator who collaborated with Orton to create the Orton-Gillingham approach, a multisensory technique for teaching reading to individuals with dyslexia.
- Margaret Byrd Rawson - American educator who further developed the Orton-Gillingham approach and founded the Orton Dyslexia Society (now the International Dyslexia Association).
- Diana Hanbury King - British-American educator who founded several schools, including The Kildonan School, for dyslexic students and developed teaching methods for dyslexia.
- Sally Shaywitz - American neuroscientist known for her research on dyslexia and advocacy for evidence-based interventions.
- Maryanne Wolf - American cognitive neuroscientist and author who has made significant contributions to the understanding of the reading brain and dyslexia.

== Notable people with dyslexia ==
- List of people with dyslexia

== See also ==
- Dysgraphia
- Disorder of written expression
- Dyscalculia, difficulty comprehending numbers and math
- Learning to read
- Orton-Gillingham
