= Transmembrane domain of ABC transporters =

Main transmembrane structural unit of ATP-binding cassette transporter proteins

ABC transporter transmembrane region

Identifiers
- Symbol: ABC_membrane
- Pfam: PF00664
- InterPro: IPR011527
- PROSITE: PDOC00364
- SCOP2: 1pf4 / SCOPe / SUPFAM
- TCDB: 3.A.1
- OPM superfamily: 17
- OPM protein: 2hyd
Available protein structures:
- PDB: IPR011527 PF00664 (ECOD; PDBsum)
- AlphaFold: IPR011527; PF00664

ABC transporter transmembrane domain is the main transmembrane structural unit of ATP-binding cassette transporter proteins, consisting of 6 to 10 alpha helixes that traverse the plasma membrane. Many members of the ABC transporter family (Pfam PF00005) have two such regions.

This family appears to correspond to ABC1 by TCDB classification.

== Subfamilies ==
- Sulphate ABC transporter permease protein 2 InterPro: IPR005667
- Phosphate transport system permease protein 2 InterPro: IPR005672
- Phosphonate uptake transporter InterPro: IPR005769
- Nitrate transport permease InterPro: IPR005889
- NifC-like ABC-type porter InterPro: IPR006469
- Phosphate ABC transporter, permease protein PstC InterPro: IPR011864
- Molybdate ABC transporter, permease protein InterPro: IPR011867
- Nickel ABC transporter, permease subunit NikB InterPro: IPR014156
- Nickel ABC transporter, permease subunit NikC InterPro: IPR014157
- Ectoine/hydroxyectoine ABC transporter, permease protein EhuD InterPro: IPR014341
- Ectoine/hydroxyectoine ABC transporter, permease protein EhuC InterPro: IPR014342

== Human proteins containing this domain ==
ABCB1; ABCB10; ABCB11; ABCB4; ABCB5; ABCB6; ABCB7; ABCB8; ABCB9; ABCC1; ABCC10; ABCC11; ABCC12; ABCC13; ABCC2; ABCC3; ABCC4; ABCC5; ABCC6; ABCC8; ABCC9; CFTR; TAP1; TAP2; TAPL;
