= Research in dyslexia =

Research into a reading disorder

Dyslexia is a reading disorder wherein an individual experiences trouble with reading. Individuals with dyslexia have normal levels of intelligence but can exhibit difficulties with spelling, reading fluency, pronunciation, "sounding out" words, writing out words, and reading comprehension. The neurological nature and underlying causes of dyslexia are an active area of research. However, some experts believe that the distinction of dyslexia as a separate reading disorder and therefore recognized disability is controversial.

== History ==
Dyslexia was first identified by Oswald Berkhan in 1881, and the term 'dyslexia' later coined in 1887 by Rudolf Berlin, an ophthalmologist practicing in Stuttgart, Germany.

During the twentieth century, dyslexia was primarily seen as a phonological deficit (specifically phonological awareness) that resulted in a reading deficit. Dyslexia was seen as an issue with reading achievement specifically, caused by deficits in discrimination of written word sounds as opposed to a broader disorder of brain function. However, much research from the 1990s onward has focused on the potential biological bases of dyslexia and understanding dyslexia as a disorder of brain function. One of the first weaknesses of the strictly phonological deficit hypothesis for dyslexia was its inability to account for the genetic link of dyslexia. Specifically, it's been shown that "Relatively high heritabilities were observed for both reading ability and dyslexia indicating substantial genetic influences." In a large twin study (sample 1031 twins), Gayan and Olson established that dyslexia was highly heritable, while a family study by Pennington (sample 1698 individuals) showed familial risk rates of 35–45%.

Without a biological explanation for dyslexia, this heritability went unexplained. Not only must the heritability be explained, but also the environmental factors that protected at-risk children from developing dyslexia. Research began to focus on potential biological causes and to center the study of dyslexia in a developmental framework. A second major weakness of the strictly phonological deficit hypothesis was its strict definition of dyslexia as a reading disorder. Consequently, the various secondary symptoms were unable to be explained, including automatization deficits of both skill and knowledge acquisition, balance impairments, motor skill/writing deficits, and muscle tone underdevelopment. New theories of dyslexia began to be a focus of research, with the most well established being the magnocellular deficit theory the automatization deficit theory, and the double-deficit hypothesis.

== Theories ==
Theories of the etiology of dyslexia have and are evolving with each new generation of dyslexia researchers, and the more recent theories of dyslexia tend to enhance one or more of the older theories as understanding of the nature of dyslexia evolves.

Theories should not be viewed as competing, but as attempting to explain the underlying causes of a similar set of symptoms from a variety of research perspectives and background.

=== Cerebellar theory ===
The cerebellar theory of dyslexia asserts that the cause of dyslexia is an abnormality in the cerebellum (a region in the back of the brain), which in turn cause disruption in normal development, which causes issues with motor control, balance, working memory, attention, automatization, and ultimately, reading. This theory was initially proposed by Harold Levinson and Jan Frank in 1973 and further developed by Levinson and other researchers. Angela Fawcett and Rod Nicolson later proposed that the cerebellum contributes to motor control during the articulation of speech, and that articulation problems can contribute to the phonological processing deficits that can cause dyslexia. They also reasoned that the cerebellum contributes to the automatisation of learned behaviors, which may include learning the grapheme-phoneme relationships when reading text.

In attempting to explain all the many known reading and non-reading dyslexic symptoms, therapies and theories as well as the presence of only cerebellar and related vestibular neurophysiological signs in dyslexics, the cerebellum was postulated to coordinate in time and space all signals (visual, auditory, tactile, proprioceptive, motion) entering and leaving the brain as well as signal interconnections. The quality and severity of the many symptoms characterizing each dyslexic was reasoned to depend on the diverse cerebral cortical and other brain processors receiving scrambled signals due to a cerebellar dysfunction. Helpful therapies were reasoned to enhance cerebellar fine tuning (e.g., the use of cerebellar-vestibular stabilizing antimotion sickness medications) and/or improve descrambling and other compensatory cognitive capabilities (e.g., tutoring, biofeedback). Most other theories equate the dyslexia disorder with impaired reading comprehension and so attempt to only explain the latter. Another cerebellar proposal indicated that articulation problems can contribute to the phonological deficits that can cause dyslexia. The cerebellum also contributes to the automatisation of learned behaviors, which can include learning the grapheme-phoneme relationships when reading texts.

However, some have suggested that cerebellar dysfunction alone may not be a primary cause of dyslexia and that dysarticulation and phonological deficits appear unrelated.

=== Evolutionary hypothesis ===
This theory considers that reading is an unnatural act carried out for a very brief period in human evolutionary history. It has only been in the last hundred years that reading a visual form of speech has been promoted as a major form of communication, and subsequently a lack of time for reading behaviors to evolve. In many societies around the world the majority of the population do not use the visual notation of speech as a form of communication and do not use reading skills, and therefore have no dyslexia.

Many developmental dyslexics significantly compensate for their cerebellar-vestibula determined symptoms and signs over time and most normal young children evidence age-appropriate "dyslexic-like" symptoms and cerebellar-vestibular (CV) "immaturities." It was thus hypothesized that genetic dyslexia may represent an ontogenetic recapitulation of a pre-reading state in phylogeny and that ontogeny extended beyond the embryo into childhood and occasionally beyond, thus perhaps explaining late and even late-late blooming. The development of reading and related writing and spelling functioning, as well as the corresponding ontogenetic CV-cerebral developmental lag hypothesis of dyslexia, is indirectly supported by studies suggesting that "the cerebellum has enlarged between three and fourfold in [only] the past million years of evolution [together with a corresponding spurt of the cerebrum]."

=== Magnocellular theory ===
The magnocellular theory attempts to unify the cerebellar theory, the phonological theory, the rapid auditory processing theory, and the visual theory. The magnocellular theory proposes that the magnocellular dysfunction is not only restricted to the visual pathways but also includes auditory and tactile modalities.

Historically, studies of contrast sensitivity were held to be in conflict with magnocellular theory, but as of 2010, studies of visual evoked potentials have generally supported it. Subjects' age (10-46), differences in experimental design, small sample sizes (<10 dyslexic subjects in prominent studies), and the presence, absence, or failure to assess for comorbid ADHD might explain these contradictory findings.

=== Naming speed deficit and double deficit theories ===
The speed with which an individual can engage in the rapid automatized naming of familiar objects or letters is a strong predictor of dyslexia. Slow naming speed can be identified as early as kindergarten and persists in adults with dyslexia.

A deficit in naming speed is hypothesized to represent a deficit that is separate from phonological processing deficit. Wolf identified four types of readers: readers with no deficits, readers with phonological processing deficit, readers with naming speed deficit, and readers with double deficit (that is, problems both with phonological processing and naming speed). Students with double deficits are most likely to have some sort of severe reading impairment.

Distinguishing among these deficits has important implications for instructional intervention. If students with double deficits receive instruction only in phonological processing, they are only receiving part of what they need.

=== Perceptual visual-noise exclusion hypothesis ===
The concept of a perceptual noise exclusion deficit (impaired filtering of behaviorally irrelevant visual information in dyslexia or visual-noise) is an emerging hypothesis, supported by research showing that subjects with dyslexia experience difficulty in performing visual tasks (such as motion detection in the presence of perceptual distractions) but do not show the same impairment when the distracting factors are removed in an experimental setting. The researchers have analogized their findings concerning visual discrimination tasks to findings in other research related to auditory discrimination tasks. They assert that dyslexic symptoms arise because of an impaired ability to filter out both visual and auditory distractions, and to categorize information so as to distinguish the important sensory data from the irrelevant.

=== Phonological deficit theory ===
The phonological deficit theory proposes that people with dyslexia have a specific sound manipulation impairment, which affects their auditory memory, word recall, and sound association skills when processing speech. The phonological theory explains a reading impairment when using an alphabetic writing system which requires learning the grapheme/phoneme correspondence, the relationship between the graphic letter symbols and speech sounds which they represent.

=== Rapid auditory processing theory ===
The rapid auditory processing theory is an alternative to the phonological deficit theory, which specifies that the primary deficit lies in the perception of short or rapidly varying sounds. Support for this theory arises from evidence that people with dyslexia show poor performance on a number of auditory tasks, including frequency discrimination and temporal order judgment.

=== Visual theory ===
The visual theory represents a traditional perspective of dyslexia, as being the result of a visual impairment creating problems when processing information from letters and words from a written text. This includes visual processing problems such as binocular, poor vergence, and visual crowding. The visual theory does not deny the possibility of alternative causes of dyslexia.

== Research ==
Various methods and models have been used to study dyslexia.

=== Genetics ===
High genetic concordance found in twin studies suggest a significant genetic influence on reading ability, although the degree depends on the definition of dyslexia. Linkage analysis and genetic association studies (typically quantitative trait locus association studies, which use microarrays to look at single nucleotide polymorphisms of multiple genes at once) have been used to identify candidate genes that may be implicated in dyslexia, which have then been confirmed in various knockout models.

As of 2018 the leading candidate genes included DYX1C1 on chromosome 15, DCDC2 and KIAA0319 on chromosome 6, and ROBO1 on chromosome 3. These genes appear to be involved in neuronal migration, which has led to a theory of impaired migration during development of the nervous system in humans as a cause for developmental dyslexia. Other genes associated with dyslexia have included RBFOX2, ABCC13, ZNF385D, COL4A2 and FGF18.

However, these genes account for a small proportion of variance in reading disability, often less than 0.5%. Additionally, the findings are not always replicated nor consistently supported by genome-wide association studies. Therefore, no single gene is definitively implicated in dyslexia. A 2007 review reported that no specific cognitive processes are known to be influenced by the proposed genes and that scientists had begun to include neurophysiological (e.g., event-related potential) and imaging (e.g., functional MRI) procedures in their phenotype characterisation of people with dyslexia.

It is likely that multiple genes, as well as the environment, interact to influence reading ability. The Generalist Genes hypothesis proposes that many of the same genes are implicated within different aspects of a learning disability as well as between different learning disabilities. Indeed, there also appear to be a large genetic influence on other learning abilities, such as language skills. The Generalist Genes hypothesis supports the findings that many learning disabilities are comorbid, such as speech sound disorder, language impairment, and reading disability, although this is also influenced by diagnostic overlap.

=== Neuroimaging ===
Magnetic resonance imaging (MRI) and diffusion tensor imaging (DTI) are the main neuroimaging methods used to study brain structure in people with dyslexia, and functional magnetic resonance imaging (fMRI) along with EEG are used to study brain function.

=== Visual processing ===
Visual processes constitute an important part of higher cortical functioning. The encoding and interpretation of retinal stimulation occur at the neurological level upon reception of afferent input from the eyes. Reading, for example, requires the possession of both adequate vision and the neurological ability to process what is seen. In the past, many researchers have associated anomalies in the visual system as the main cause of dyslexia. While acknowledging that most such theories are untenable, visual system deficits have been shown to contribute to symptoms of dyslexia, such as word reversal and skipping words.

A small subset of dyslexic individuals have been demonstrated to have deficits in the magnocellular visual system. A compromised magnocellular system, responsible for the processing of images with high temporal frequencies and high degree of movement, might be the main contributing factor to the reported "masking" of words reported among dyslexic individuals. Researchers posit that such a "masking" effect is due to the abnormal longevity of the visual trace produced in the magnocellular system, resulting in a lapse in acuity as effected individuals attempt to process connected text.

Anomalies in saccadic movement, which are instantaneous, fast, oscillating eye movements essential for unimpaired reading have been observed in people with dyslexia. When corrected for reading ability, dyslexic individuals demonstrate below normal saccadic eye movements, suggesting that the severity reading disorders may be due to oculo-motor deficits. However, further examination of the phenomenon shows that saccadic patterns in dyslexics seem to be a result and not the cause of the disorder, as decoding and comprehension failure were isolated as the antecedent for impairments in both the speed and accuracy with which dyslexics read. Also, there is no evidence that children with oculomotor impairments are at risk of developing dyslexia.

Also suspected are convergence insufficiency and poor accommodation, both of which are uncommon in children, can interfere with the physical act of reading but not with decoding.

=== Language processing ===
Brain activation studies using PET to study language have found that people with dyslexia have a deficit in parts of the left hemisphere of the brain involved in reading, which includes the inferior frontal gyrus, inferior parietal lobule, and middle and ventral temporal cortex. A neural basis for the visual lexicon and for auditory verbal short term memory components have been proposed. Wernicke's and Broca's areas are being recast in terms of localized components of phonological input and output. Some classical regions, such as the arcuate fasciculus, are having their "classical" roles questioned, while other regions, such as the basal temporal language zone, are growing progressively in terms of their recognized importance.

=== Working memory ===
People with dyslexia have been commonly associated with working memory deficits, along with reduced activity in the pre-frontal and parietal cortex.

Observed differences in the neural pattern of people with dyslexia, namely decreased activation in the left and posterior midfrontal gyrus (LMG, PMG) and superior parietial regions of the brain further supports the view that deficits in working memory contribute to dyslexia. LMG and PMG are commonly associated with working memory processes such as memory updating and temporal order memory. Behavioral experiments in dyslexia have largely been supportive of the mediating role assumed by working memory between neurological abnormalities and dyslexic behavior.

== Limitations ==
It is difficult to control for confounders when attempting to isolate specific causes; for example, the response to instructions by children is itself confounded by a subjects' environments, genetics and socio-economic status.

== Controversy ==
In recent years there has been significant debate on the categorization of dyslexia. In particular, Elliot and Gibbs argue that "attempts to distinguish between categories of 'dyslexia' and 'poor reader' or 'reading disabled' are scientifically unsupportable, arbitrary and thus potentially discriminatory".

While acknowledging that reading disability is a valid scientific curiosity, and that "seeking greater understanding of the relationship between visual symbols and spoken language is crucial" and that while there was "potential of genetics and neuroscience for guiding assessment and educational practice at some stage in the future", they conclude that "there is a mistaken belief that current knowledge in these fields is sufficient to justify a category of dyslexia as a subset of those who encounter reading difficulties".

The Dyslexia Myth is a documentary that first aired in September 2005 as part of the Dispatches series produced by British broadcaster Channel 4. Focusing only on the reading difficulties that people with dyslexia encounter the documentary says that myths and misconceptions surround dyslexia. It argues that the common understanding of dyslexia is not only false but makes it more difficult to provide the reading help that hundreds of thousands of children desperately need. Drawing on years of intensive academic research on both sides of the Atlantic, it challenged the existence of dyslexia as a separate condition, and highlighted the many different forms of reading styles.

Julian Elliot, an educational psychologist at Durham University in the United Kingdom, disputes the characterization of dyslexia as a medical condition, and believes it should be treated simply as a reading difficulty. According to Elliot, "Parents don't want their child to be considered lazy, thick or stupid. If they get called this medically diagnosed term, dyslexic, then it is a signal to all that it's not to do with intelligence." Elliot believes that children of all levels of intelligence may struggle with learning to read, and that all can be helped by educational strategies appropriate to their needs. He feels that resources are wasted on diagnosis and testing, and favors early intervention programs for all struggling readers. More recently Julian Elliot has also made reference to the 28 Definitions of Dyslexia which were documented in the Appendices of the National Research and Development Centre for Adult Literacy and Numeracy report on Developmental dyslexia in adults: a research review by Michael Rice with Greg Brooks May 2004.

John Everatt of the University of Surrey 2007, has suggested that:

- dyslexic students can be distinguished from other children with low reading achievement by testing geared to assessing their strengths as well as weaknesses
- dyslexic children tend to score significantly better than other children, including non-impaired children, on tests of creativity, spatial memory, and spatial reasoning
- dyslexic children also perform better than other reading-impaired children on tests of vocabulary and listening comprehension
- dyslexic children may be better served by educational intervention which includes strategies geared to their unique strengths in addition to skill remediation

and thus recommends more comprehensive evaluation and targeted interventions.

== See also ==
- Linguistics
- Orthographies and dyslexia
