= PAAT (protein) =

Gene profile for C10orf88 (aka PAAT)

C10orf88

Identifiers
- Aliases: C10orf88, chromosome 10 open reading frame 88, PAAT
- External IDs: MGI: 1915527; GeneCards: C10orf88

Gene location (Human)
Chr.	Chromosome 10 (human)
Band	10q26.13	Start	122,930,901 bp
Band	10q26.13	End	122,954,311 bp

Gene location (Mouse)
Chr.	Chromosome 7 (mouse)
Band	7|7 F3	Start	130,939,949 bp
Band	7|7 F3	End	130,964,488 bp
RNA expression pattern
Bgee	Human / Mouse (ortholog); Top expressed in: gonad; right testis; left testis; ganglionic eminence; testicle; ventricular zone; prefrontal cortex; islet of Langerhans; Achilles tendon; stromal cell of endometrium / Top expressed in: occiput; occipital bone; facial motor nucleus; hand; soleus muscle; oocyte; substantia nigra; yolk sac; primary oocyte; Meckel's cartilage; More reference expression data
BioGPS	n/a
Orthologs
Databases	NCBI: entry; OMA: entry
Species	Human	Mouse
Entrez	80007	68277
Ensembl	ENSG00000119965	ENSMUSG00000040177
UniProt	Q9H8K7	Q9D2Q3
RefSeq (mRNA)	NM_024942	NM_026655
RefSeq (protein)	NP_079218	NP_080931
Location (UCSC)	Chr 10: 122.93 – 122.95 Mb	Chr 7: 130.94 – 130.96 Mb
PubMed search
- Wikidata
View/Edit Human	View/Edit Mouse

PAAT (protein associated with ABC transporters), also known as C10orf88 (chromosome 10 open reading frame 88), is a human protein encoded by the gene of the same name. It contains an ABC transporter domain predicted to associate with Type II ABC transporters. PAAT physically interacts with mitochondrial inner membrane ABC transporters and has a demonstrated role in ferric nutrient transport and heme biosynthesis. It is primarily expressed in the cerebral cortex, testis, and thymus, and localizes to the cytoplasm and nucleus. The gene has been associated with a rare form of Alzheimer's disease.

== Evolution ==
The earliest detectable ortholog of PAAT occurs in the subphylum Cephalochordata, specifically the European lancelet (Branchiostoma lanceolatum). This organism represents one of the most basal chordates, diverging from the vertebrate lineage approximately 588 million years ago (MYA), likely during the Cambrian period, though some phylogenetic models place this divergence as late as the Cretaceous. The lancelet ortholog shares only 21% sequence identity and 38% similarity with the human protein, with a corrected sequence divergence (CSD) of 156%. A comparable pattern holds in the Brook lamprey (Lampetra planeri), another early-branching chordate. No orthologs have been identified in invertebrates or prokaryotes, therefore PAAT appears to have a chordate-specific origin. PAAT is also absent in Sarcopterygii, despite being present in Actinopterygii; these groups differ in the presence of limb buds supported by articulated appendicular skeletons.

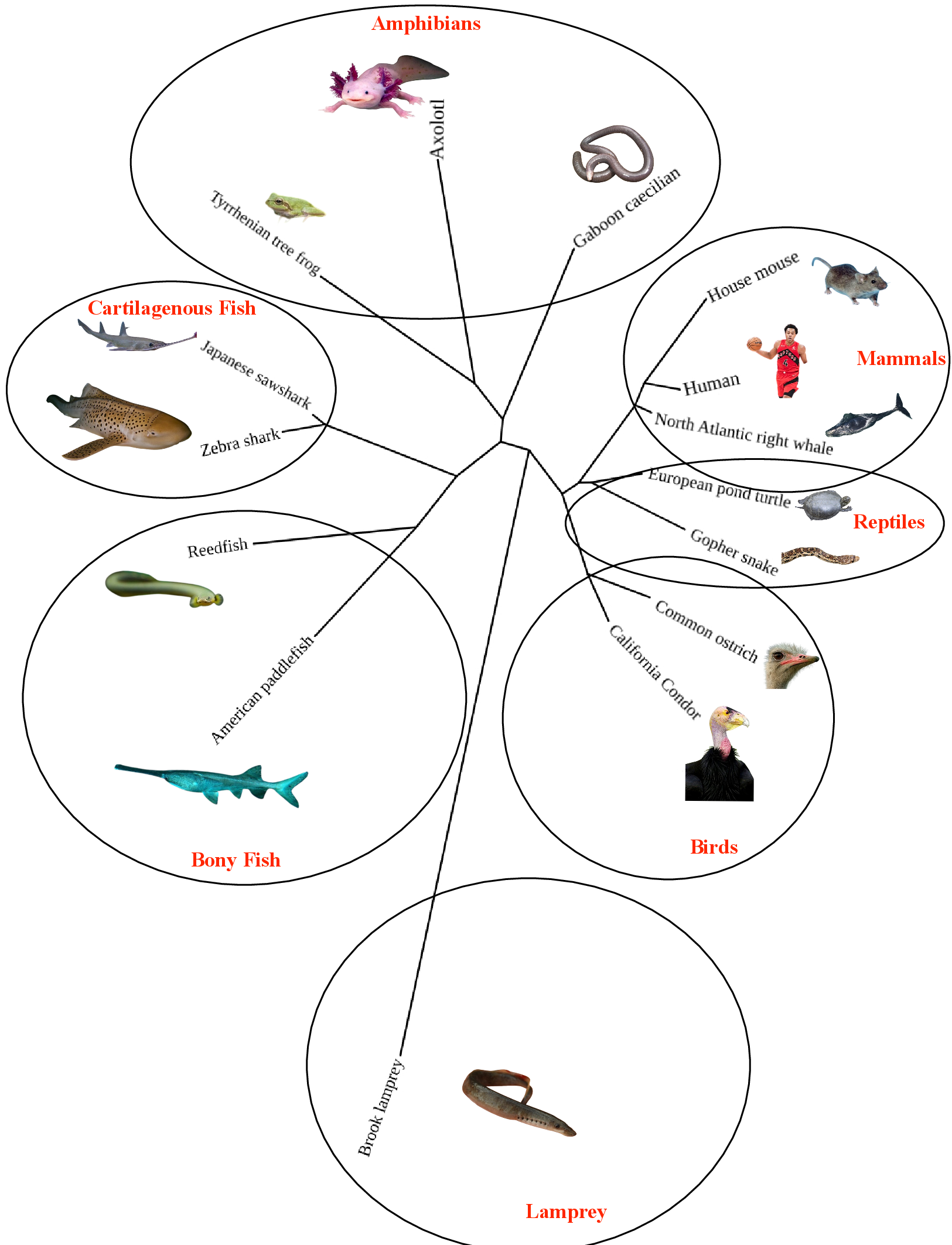
Phylogenetic tree for Human PAAT, with the relation of the species from furthest to closest.

Sequence identity increases progressively with greater relatedness, with mammals averaging approximately 80% identity and the lowest overall CSD values. This pattern is consistent with purifying selection in lineages reliant on hemoglobin-based oxygen transport, given PAAT's proposed role in heme transport.

Compared to model proteins with well-characterized evolutionary rates, Cytochrome C (slow) and Fibrinogen alpha (fast), PAAT tracks closer to the fast-evolving end, with CSD values rising steeply with phylogenetic distance. This rapid divergence may reflect substantial functional variation across taxa, particularly given that heme transport roles appear prominent only in humans.

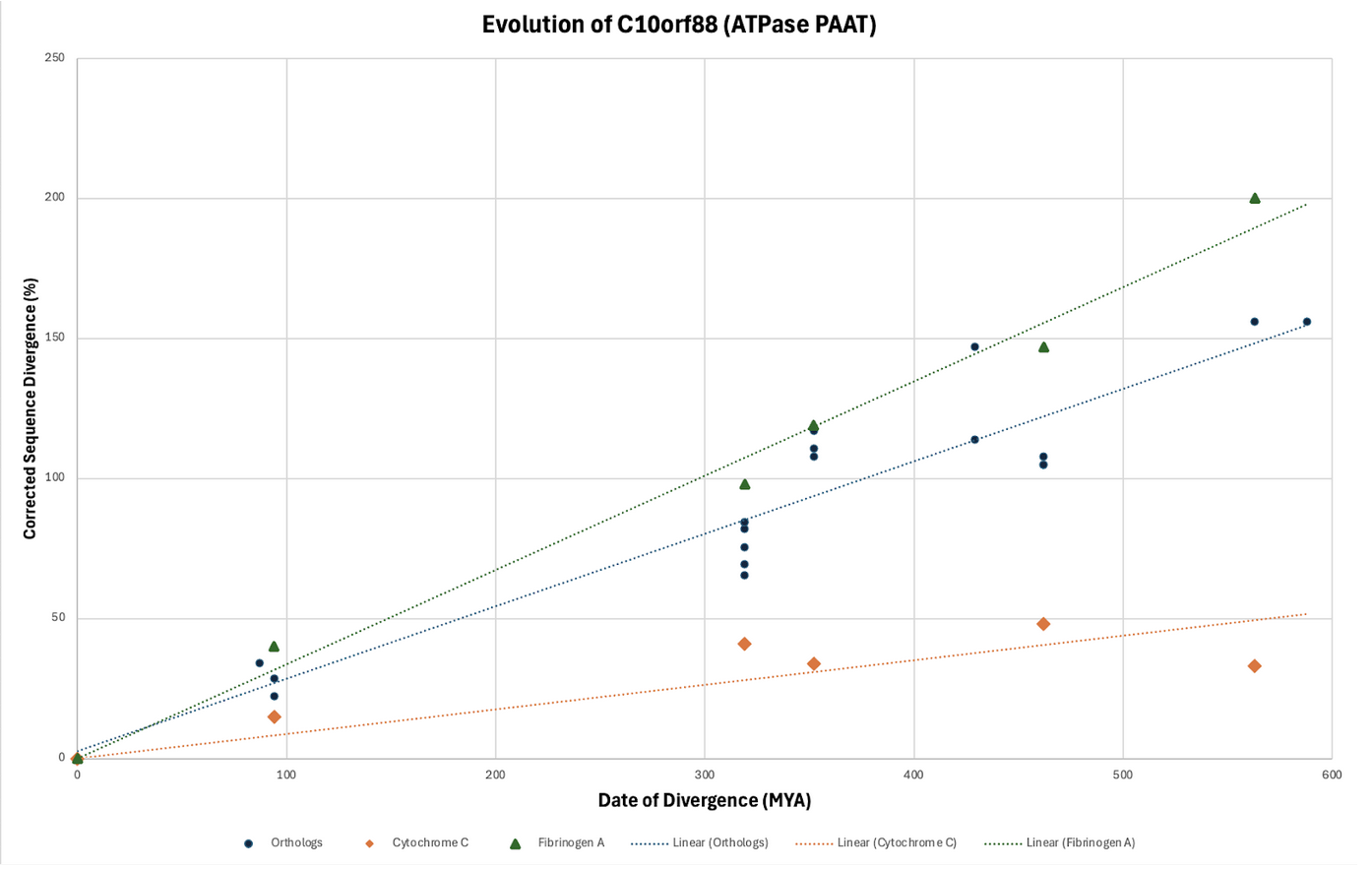
Evolutionary history of the gene PAAT, in comparison to faster evolving genes such as Cytochrome C and Fibrinogen Alpha.

Class	Seq	Genus species	Common name	Taxon	Date of Div (MYA)	CorSeqDiv%	Accession #	Seq Length (aa)	Seq ID (%)	Seq Sim (%)
Mammalia	Hsa	Homo sapiens	Human	Primates	0	0	NP_079218	445	100	100
Mammalia	Mmu	Mus musculus	House mouse	Rodentia	87	34.24903089	NP_080931.1	444	71	83
Mammalia	Egl	Eubalaena glacialis	North Atlantic right whale	Artiodactyl	94	22.31435513	XP_061048496.1	445	80	88
Mammalia	Fca	Felis catus	House cat	Carnivora	94	28.76820725	XP_038614534.1	444	75	85
Reptilia	Eor	Emys orbicularis	European pond turtle	Testudines	319	65.39264674	XP_065264191.1	462	52	68
Reptilia	Pra	Podarcis raffonei	Aeolian wall lizard	Lacertidae	319	69.31471806	XP_053244946.1	456	47	59
Reptilia	Pca	Pituophis catenifer	Gopher snake	Squamata	319	84.39700703	XP_070801900.1	454	43	59
Aves	Gca	Gymnogyps californianus	Californian Condor	Accipitriformes	319	75.50225843	XP_050754500.1	445	47	62
Aves	Aph	Agelaius phoeniceus	Red-winged blackbird	Passeriformes	319	82.09805521	XP_054493097.1	442	44	60
Aves	Sca	Struthio camelus	Common ostrich	Struthioniformes	319	84.39700703	XP_068807255.1	481	43	59
Amphibia	Ame	Ambystoma mexicanum	Axolotl	Urodela	352	107.8809661	XP_069468114.1	405	34	52
Amphibia	Hya	Hyla sarda	Tyrrhenian tree frog	Anura	352	110.8662625	XP_056385755.1	409	33	50
Amphibia	Gse	Geotrypetes seraphini	Gaboon caecilian	Gymnophiona	352	117.1182982	XP_033799666.1	371	31	45
Actinopterygii	Psp	Polyodon spathula	American paddlefish	Acipenseriformes	429	113.9434283	XP_041125204.1	433	32	51
Actinopterygii	Eca	Erpetoichthys calabaricus	Reedfish	Polypteriformes	429	146.967597	XP_028651065.1	438	23	45
Chondrichthyes	Sti	Stegostoma tigrinum	Zebra shark	Orectolobiformes	462	104.9822124	XP_048407415.1	439	35	52
Chondrichthyes	Hfr	Heterodontus francisci	Horn shark	Heterodontiformes	462	104.9822124	XP_067908923.1	441	35	50
Chondrichthyes	Pja	Pristiophorus japonicus	Japanese sawshark	Pristiophoriformes	462	107.8809661	XP_070732813.1	448	34	51
Petromyzontida	Lpl	Lampetra planeri	Brook lamprey	Petromyzontiformes	563	156.0647748	CAL9842239	499	21	35
Leptocardii	Bla	Branchiostoma lanceolatum	European lancelet	Branchiostomatidae	588	156.0647748	CAH1258791.1	414	21	38

== Gene ==
PAAT maps to chromosome 10 at cytogenetic locus 10q26.13. The gene spans 2,913 base pairs, comprises six exons and five introns, and encodes a 445-amino acid protein. No isoforms or splice variants have been identified. The mature mRNA is 1,497 nucleotides after splicing.

=== Transcription Factors ===
The PAAT promoter contains binding sites for transcription factors associated with neural, immune, and reproductive contexts, consistent with the gene's expression profile. Key factors include NRF1, NR2C2, ELK4, ETV4, TFAP2A, and IRF3.

== Protein ==
PAAT functions as a novel ATPase, catalyzing ATP hydrolysis to regulate iron homeostasis. It contains two domains: a primary PAAT-like functional domain, and a secondary domain shared with other ABC transporters (designated "ABC Transport 1"). The ABC Transport 1 domain is predominantly beta sheet in secondary structure, while the C-terminus is largely alpha-helical. The protein has a theoretical isoelectric point of 6.0 and a predicted molecular weight of 49.2 kDa. No isoforms, disulfide bonds, or oligomerization have been identified.

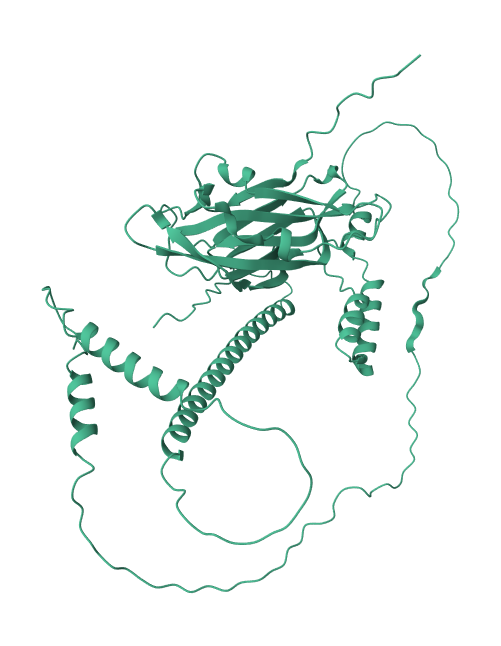
The tertiary structure prediction for PAAT

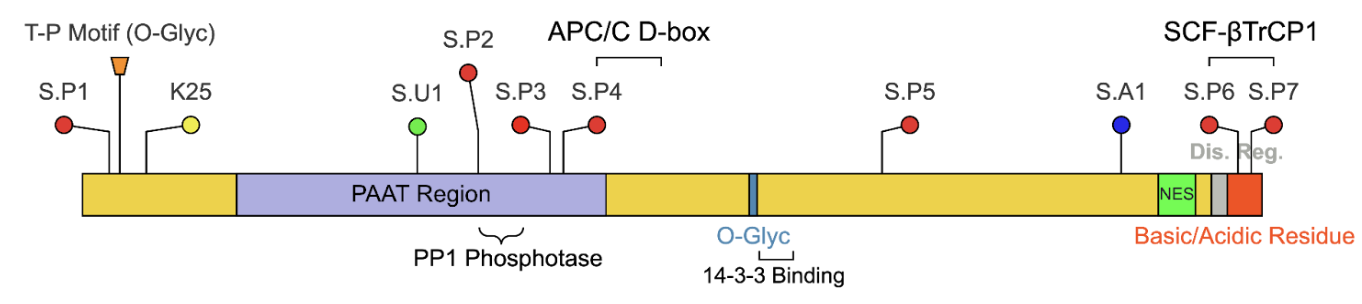
PAAT Protein Diagram annotated for various post-translational modifications, domains, and other important features.

=== Subcellular Localization ===
PSORT II and DeepLoc both predict mainly nuclear localization (~60% confidence). Their secondary predictions branch: PSORT II favors mitochondrial (17.4%) and cytoplasmic (13%) signals, while DeepLoc assigns a stronger cytoplasmic probability (41%). No mitochondrial targeting sequences or cleavage sites have been detected, which weighs against exclusive mitochondrial localization. WoLF PSORT confirms nuclear and cytoplasmic localization as the two primary compartments. Analysis of known interacting proteins similarly clusters in the nucleus and cytoplasm, with mitochondria as a secondary possibility. These predictions are consistent across orthologs.

=== Protein Interactions ===
PAAT is experimentally confirmed to interact with the mitochondrial inner membrane transporters ABCB7, ABCB8, and ABCB10, but not with ABCB1 or ABCG2. The STRING database identifies ten interacting proteins, five with experimental support: CLTC, GDI2, CCDC91, NCKAP1, and LILRB4. Most interactions are supported by co-expression data, except TEX9, NADSYN1, and LILRB4; all but POLR3F are text-mining supported. CLTC shows the most consistent co-expression across GEO microarray datasets. NADSYN1 and CYP2R1 may interact with PAAT through the vitamin D pathway.

=== Post-Translational Modifications ===
PAAT is predicted to undergo phosphorylation at multiple serine residues (S11, S150, S201), lysine acetylation at K25, and both N- and O-linked glycosylation. Degron motifs are present for both SCF-βTrCP1 and APC/C complexes. Functional motifs include 14-3-3 and SH2 binding sites, a PP1 phosphatase docking site, and a nuclear export signal. No signal peptides, lipid anchors, or organelle-targeting sequences have been detected.

== Expression ==
=== Gene Expression ===
PAAT is expressed across a broad range of human tissues, with elevated RNA levels in the testis (RPKM: 4.006), brain (RPKM: 1.916), and thymus per Human Protein Atlas RNA-seq data.

GEO datasets (GDS1096, GDS596, GDS3113) refine this picture further. GDS1096 shows broad brain expression with peaks in the thalamus and amygdala, alongside strong testis expression. GDS596 highlights olivary ganglia, superior cervical ganglia, and dorsal root ganglia. GDS3113 shows high expression in both the fetal brain and the testis. Total RNA-seq across 20 human tissues confirms significant expression in the cerebellum and thymus.

During fetal development, circular RNA data indicate early-stage PAAT expression across tissues without marked tissue specificity, for which a broad developmental role has been proposed.

=== Expression Quantitative Trait Loci (eQTLs) ===
Several eQTLs regulate PAAT expression in a tissue-dependent manner. The variant chr10_123305622_C_A_b38 has a strong negative normalized effect score (NES: −1.0) in EBV-transformed lymphocytes, while chr10_123424873_AT_A_b38 shows a positive NES (0.86) in the esophagus muscularis. Brain-region variants, including those in the caudate and cerebellar hemisphere, exert negative regulatory effects. A testis-specific positive eQTL (NES: 0.39) is also present. Some eQTL-affected tissue, such as EBV-transformed lymphocytes and esophageal tissue, is not well represented at the protein level, which may reflect disease- or context-specific regulatory activity.

=== Protein Expression ===
Immunohistochemical data show cytoplasmic staining in the testis and pancreas. Testicular expression is confined to subsets of cells within the seminiferous ducts; pancreatic expression is prominent in exocrine glandular cells. PaxDb places PAAT protein abundance near the proteome average, with higher levels in the brain, testis, lymph nodes, and ovaries, which are broadly consistent with the RNA expression data.

=== Condition-Specific Expression ===
PAAT expression changes in several diseases and differentiation contexts. It is upregulated in redifferentiated podocytes derived from amniotic kidney progenitor cells, a finding that may indicate a role in renal cell maturation. In skeletal muscle from individuals with Myotonic Dystrophy Type 2 (DM2), PAAT is downregulated. It is also upregulated in peripheral blood mononuclear cells during Simian Immunodeficiency Virus (SIV) infection, particularly following PD-1 antibody treatment.

== Function ==
Yang et al. (2014) characterized PAAT as a trans-regulator of mitochondrial ABC transporters with intrinsic ATPase activity. The protein localizes to both the cytoplasm and mitochondria and selectively interacts with ABCB7, ABCB8, and ABCB10, but not ABCB1 or ABCG2, to modulate ferric nutrient transport and heme biosynthesis. Through ATP hydrolysis, PAAT maintains mitochondrial membrane potential and iron homeostasis; its depletion increases oxidative DNA damage and triggers cell death.

== Clinical Significance ==
=== Alzheimer's Disease ===
PAAT has been linked to a rare familial form of Alzheimer's disease designated AD15, which presents with amyloid-β plaques but lacks neurofibrillary tangles.

=== Vitamin D Metabolism ===
PAAT has been proposed to interact with Cytochrome P450 during hydroxylation in the Vitamin D cycle, with dysregulation associated with Vitamin D deficiency.

=== Lipid Metabolism ===
GWAS data associate PAAT variants rs7904973 and rs12246352 with lower LDL and Apolipoprotein B levels in humans. In rat models, PAAT has been linked to 2-Methylbutyryl-CoA Dehydrogenase Deficiency (a BCAA catabolism disorder) and craniosynostosis.
