= PAAT =

Paat is a town in Sindh, Pakistan.

Paat may also refer to:

== People ==
- Mohd Fazli Paat (born 1987), Malaysian footballer
- Mylene Paat (born 1994), Filipina volleyball player

== Other uses ==
- PAAT (protein)
- Casco Cove Coast Guard Station, on Attu Island, Alaska
