= Thomas Miles =

Thomas Miles may refer to:

- Thomas J. Miles, legal professor and dean of the University of Chicago Law School
- Thomas O. Miles (1789–1858), Canadian politician
- Thomas Miles (entertainer), American comedian also known by the stage name Nephew Tommy
- Thomas Richard Miles (1923–2008), British professor of psychology at Bangor University
- Thomas Miles (Canadian football) (born 1992), Canadian football linebacker
- Tom Miles (athlete) (1905–1961), Australian sprinter
- Tom Miles (politician) (born 1979), member of the Mississippi House of Representatives

== See also ==
- Miles Thomas (1897–1980), Welsh businessman
- Thomas Myles (1857–1937), Irish Home Ruler and surgeon
- Thomas Myles (disambiguation)
