= ABCdb =

Biological database

Content
- Description: ABCdb database on ABC transporter systems in prokaryotic genomes.
- Data types captured: ATP-binding Cassette (ABC) transporters
- Organisms: prokaryotes

Contact
- Research center: University of Toulouse, CNRS
- Laboratory: LMGM
- Primary citation: PMID 16499625

Access
- Website: http://www-abcdb.biotoul.fr/

Tools
- Web: advanced search, BLAST

Miscellaneous
- Curation policy: yes - automatic and manual
- Bookmarkable entities: yes

ABCdb is a biological database for the adenosine triphosphate-binding cassette (ABC) transporters encoded by completely sequenced archaeal and bacterial genomes. These proteins are important for transporting substances into cells and are found in all living organisms.

== biological function of ABC systems ==
Most ABC systems function in the transport of a compound across a membrane into the cell (importer) or to the exterior (exporter), for which the system generates energy by the hydrolysis of adenosine triphosphate (ATP). The ABC transporters occur in all living organisms.

An ABC transporter system consist minimally of two components: an ATP binding cassette and a transmembrane domain or membrane spanning domain. These are usually separate proteins or can occur as protein domains. A typical ABC transporter is composed of two nucleotide binding domains that energize transport via ATP hydrolysis and of two membrane spanning domains that act as a membrane channel for the substrate. Importers require a solute binding protein that recognizes and binds the substrate.

The different partners of an ABC system are generally encoded by neighboring genes.

== Features ==
The ABC proteins form a protein superfamily encoded by large families of paralogous genes. Sequence analysis shows that members of the ABC superfamily may have diverged from common ancestral forms and permits to organize ABC proteins into sub-families. The classification of ABC systems into (sub-)families can help to predict which substrates may be transported by the system.

ABCdb is a public resource, from which one can:

- select a strain from the tree of species and view all its ABC systems, classified into (sub-)families.
- for a particular ABC (sub-)family, compare all the proteins of completely sequenced prokaryotes.
- use a protein sequence and blast it against ABCdb to find annotations for similar proteins

== See also ==
- Membrane transport protein
- TCDB Transporter Classification database
- ABC transporters
- ATP-binding domain of ABC transporters
- Transmembrane domain of ABC transporters
