= TAPL =

TAPL may refer to:

- ABCB9, a protein
- The AWK Programming Language, a 1988 book by Alfred V. Aho, Brian W. Kernighan, and Peter J. Weinberger
- Types and Programming Languages, a 2002 book by Benjamin C. Pierce
