= Double deficit =

Double deficit may refer to:

- Double deficit (economics)
- Double deficit theory of dyslexia
