= Special needs =

People who require assistance for disabilities

In clinical diagnostic and functional development, special needs (or additional needs) refers to individuals who require assistance for disabilities that may be medical, mental, or psychological. Guidelines for clinical diagnosis are given in both the Diagnostic and Statistical Manual of Mental Disorders and the International Classification of Diseases 9th edition. Special needs can range from people with autism, cerebral palsy, Down syndrome, dyslexia, dyscalculia, dyspraxia, dysgraphia, blindness, deafness, ADHD, and cystic fibrosis. They can also include cleft lips and missing limbs. The types of special needs vary in severity, and a student with a special need is classified as being a severe case when the student's IQ is between 20 and 35. These students typically need assistance in school, and have different services provided for them to succeed in a different setting.

In parts of the United Kingdom, special needs usually refers to special needs within an educational context. This is also referred to as special educational needs (SEN) or special educational needs and disabilities (SEND), additional support needs in Scotland, and in Wales is referred to as additional learning needs (ALN, Welsh: Anghenion Dysgu Ychwanegol, ADY) since 2021. In the United States, 19.4 percent of all children under the age of 18 (14,233,174 children) had special health care needs as of 2018.

The term is seen as a dysphemism by many disability rights advocates and is deprecated by a number of style guides (e.g. APA style).

== U.S. special needs and adoption statistics ==
In the United States, "special needs" is a legal term applying in foster care, derived from the language in the Adoption and Safe Families Act of 1997. It is a diagnosis used to classify children as needing more services than those children without special needs who are in the foster care system. It is a diagnosis based on behavior, childhood and family history, and is usually made by a health care professional.

More than 150,000 children with special needs in the US have been waiting for permanent homes. Traditionally, children with special needs have been considered harder to place for adoption than other children, but experience has shown that many children with special needs can be placed successfully with families who want them. The Adoption and Safe Families Act of 1997 (P.L. 105–89) has focused more attention on finding homes for children with special needs and making sure they receive the post-adoption services they need. Pre-adoption services are also of critical importance to ensure that adoptive parents are well prepared and equipped with the necessary resources for a successful adoption. The United States Congress enacted the law to ensure that children in foster care who cannot be reunited with their birth parents are freed for adoption and placed with permanent families as quickly as possible.

The disruption rate for special needs adoption is found to be somewhere between ten and sixteen percent. A 1989 study performed by Richard Barth and Marianne Berry found that of the adoptive parents that disrupted, 86% said they would likely or definitely adopt again. 50% said that they would adopt the same child, given a greater awareness of what the adoption of special needs children requires. Also, within disrupted special needs adoption cases, parents often said that they were not aware of the child's history or the severity of the child's issues before the adoption. There is also more care that goes into it when a child of special needs is in the process of getting adopted. Because of the Adoption Assistance and Child Welfare Act of 1980 P.L. 96-272, the child's needs have to be met within the home before allowing adoption, including being able to financially support the child.

== Education ==
The term special needs is a short form of special education needs and is a way to refer to students with disabilities, in which their learning may be altered or delayed compared to other students. The term special needs in the education setting comes into play whenever a child's education program is officially altered from what would normally be provided to students through an Individualized Education Plan, which is sometimes referred to as an Individual Program plan. Special education aids the student's learning environment to create a uniform system for all children.

In the past, individuals with disabilities were often shunned or kept in isolation in mental hospitals or institutions. In many countries, disabled people were seen as an embarrassment to society, often facing punishments of torture and even execution. In the US, after the creation of the 1990 Individuals with Disabilities Education Act and many other regulations, students with disabilities could not be excluded or discriminated against in the educational system.

=== Integrated learning environments ===
In many cases, the integration of special needs students into general-learning classrooms has had many benefits. A study done by Douglas Marston tested the effects of an integrated learning environment on the academic success of students with special needs. He first gathered students in from three different categories: those in isolated learning environments, those in integrated learning environments, and those in a combination of both isolated and integrated learning environments. He calculated the average number of words read by each group in the fall and again in the spring, and compared the outcome. The findings showed that those in integrated learning environments or a combination of isolated and integrated environments experienced greater improvements in their reading skills than those in strictly isolated environments.

Integrated classrooms can also have many social benefits on students with special needs. By surrounding special needs students with their fully functioning peers, they are exposed to diversity. Their close contact with other students will allow them to develop friendships and improve interpersonal skills.

=== Special needs and education worldwide ===
The integration of children with special needs into school systems is an issue that is being addressed worldwide. In Europe, the number of students with special needs in regular classrooms is rising, while the number of those in segregated exclusive special needs classrooms is declining. However, in other countries such as China, educational opportunities for those with disabilities have been a longstanding issue. Certain cultural beliefs and ideologies have prevented the integration of all students regardless of ability, yet in recent years, China has progressed significantly by allocating more funding to programs to support disabled people and striving to create more inclusive communities within schools.

== See also ==
- ASDAN
- Attention deficit hyperactivity disorder
- Auditory processing disorder
- Autistic spectrum
- Communication disorder
- Developmental disability
- Developmental coordination disorder
- Dyscalculia
- Dyslexia
- Home education in the United Kingdom
- Intellectual disability
- Learning disability
- Learning theory (education)
- Orthographies and dyslexia
- Reading for special needs
- Scotopic sensitivity syndrome
- Sensory processing disorder
- Special education
- Specific language impairment (SLI)
- Speech disorders
- Speech perception
- Visual perception
- Working memory
