= Thomas Myles (disambiguation) =

Thomas Myles may refer to:-

- Thomas Myles (1857-1937), Irish Home Ruler and surgeon
- Tom Myles (born 2005), English footballer, see 2025–26 Rochdale A.F.C. season

== See also ==
- Thomas Miles (disambiguation)
- Miles Thomas (1897–1980), Welsh businessman
