= International Dyslexia Association =

American non-profit organization

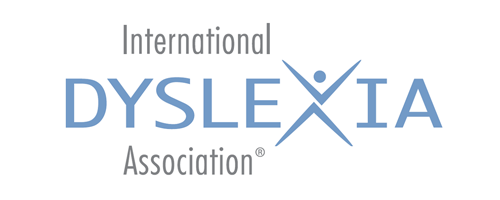
- Abbreviation: IDA
- Founded: 1949; 77 years ago
- Type: 501(c)(3)
- Tax ID no.: 52-0953609
- Legal status: Nonprofit organization
- Purpose: To study and treat dyslexia as well as related language-based learning disabilities.
- Headquarters: Pikesville, Maryland, U.S.
- Coordinates: 39.389054°N 76.73831°W
- Chief Executive Officer: Sonja Banks
- Chairman of the Board of Directors: Josh Clark
- Subsidiaries: Center for Effective Reading Instruction _{(501(c)(6)}
- Revenue: $2,647,879 (2020)
- Expenses: $2,661,377 (2020)
- Endowment: $20,000 _{(2020)}
- Employees: 26 (2019)
- Volunteers: 600 (2019)
- Website: www.dyslexiaida.org
- Formerly called: Orton Dyslexia Society

The International Dyslexia Association (IDA) is a non-profit education and advocacy organization devoted to issues surrounding dyslexia. Its headquarters are located in Pikesville, Maryland, United States.

The International Dyslexia Association serves individuals with dyslexia, their families, and professionals in the field. It has 9,000 members and it operates with more than 40 branches throughout the United States and Canada, and has global partners in twenty-one countries. IDA has an all-volunteer Board of Directors.

The IDA provides information about dyslexia on its website, publishes a peer-reviewed scientific journal (Annals of Dyslexia), publishes newsletter updates to members; provides referral services to individuals and professionals; advocates for the rights of individuals with dyslexia through the legal and Federal legislative systems. IDA is working to match increasing demand for teacher training and teacher preparation aligned with the IDA Knowledge & Practice standards. The IDA provides peer reviewed Fact Sheets and access to regional experts that together help support grassroots state and regional educational and advocacy efforts.

The International Dyslexia Association was founded in 1949 by researcher June Lyday Orton as the Orton Dyslexia Society, named after her late husband Samuel Orton, an American physician who pioneered the study of learning disabilities and examined the causes and treatment of dyslexia.
