= Harold Levinson =

American psychiatrist and author

- Born: Harold Nathan Levinson
- Occupations: Psychiatrist and Neurologist
- Known for: Contributions to Dyslexia research
- Website: Dyslexia Online

Harold Levinson is an American psychiatrist and author, known for developing his cerebellar theory of treating dyslexia.

== Career in psychiatry ==
Levinson has pursued alternative theories and treatments for dyslexia since the 1960s. In 1973 he and Jan Frank published an article in the Journal of Child Psychiatry suggesting dyslexia was caused by a faulty connection between the cerebellum and the other parts of the brain, instead of the cerebrum.

By 1974 Levinson's cerebellar and related inner-ear theory that dyslexia has been mentioned in the popular press. His cerebellar-vestibular theory led him to treating children with dyslexia as an inner ear problem, using anti-motion sickness medication. He used the same over-the-counter medication to treat the associated attention deficit, hyperactivity, impaired concentration and distractibility. He considers that his findings suggested that cerebellar problems cause a scrambling of information, which secondarily confuse higher brain processors.

Levinson appeared on television to discuss his treatment in the late 1970s and early 1980s. In 1985, he observed that 750 out of 1000 dyslexia patients also had problems with balance and coordination. By 1986 Levinson had treated more than 8,000 patients with dyslexia, and reported a success rate of between 75% and 80%. He had also studied more than 20,000 patients in total. One of the additional psychological problems Levinson determined was associated with the same brain disorder is the rise of adult phobias. Levinson's observations led him to believe that up to 90% of people who have phobias also have cerebellar and inner-ear malfunctions, leading to patient's belief the fear is rational. He published a book entitled Phobia Free in which his findings were outlined.

Levinson was interviewed on The Phil Donahue Show in the early 1980s, in addition to many other network shows like Lifestyles with Regis Philbin, and The Today Show, The Morning Show. Levinson used to be a clinical associate professor of psychiatry at New York University Medical Center. Levinson became the director of the Medical Dyslexic and Attention Deficit Disorder Treatment Centre on Long Island. He is now the Clinical and Research Director of the Levinson Medical Center for Learning Disabilities, which has had locations in New York, England, and Hong Kong.

In the 1970s Levinson also developed instruments called the 3-D Optical, Auditory and Tactile Scanners, used to gather visual, auditory- phonetic and touch sensory data related to the dyslexic condition. The scanners were used by Levinson to screen and diagnose children and adults for dyslexia.

== Publishing ==
Levinson has published his research in academic journals including Journal of the American Academy of Child Psychiatry, Perceptual and Motor Skills and Academic Therapy. In 1980 Levinson published the book Dyslexia - a Solution to the Riddle, expanding upon his theories on dyslexia, as well as related ADHD and phobias. In 1984 he then published the book Smart But Feeling Dumb, talking further about the experience of children with these disabilities. In 1991 Levinson published the book The Upside-Down Kids, which followed a hypothetical classroom containing eight children with different learning disabilities. His book Smart But Feeling Dumb was released in a revised second edition format in 2008.

Other books by Levinson include Phobia Free (1986), Total Concentration (1990), Turning Around — The Upside Down Kids (1992), A Scientific Watergate — Dyslexia (1994), and the lead chapter in The All in One Guide to ADD and Hyperactivity (2001). Levinson is also the author of the Psychology Today blog Freud's Missing Links. Subjects of his blog postings have included cerebellar theory, childhood bullying, and fraudulent science.
