= Characteristics of dyslexia =

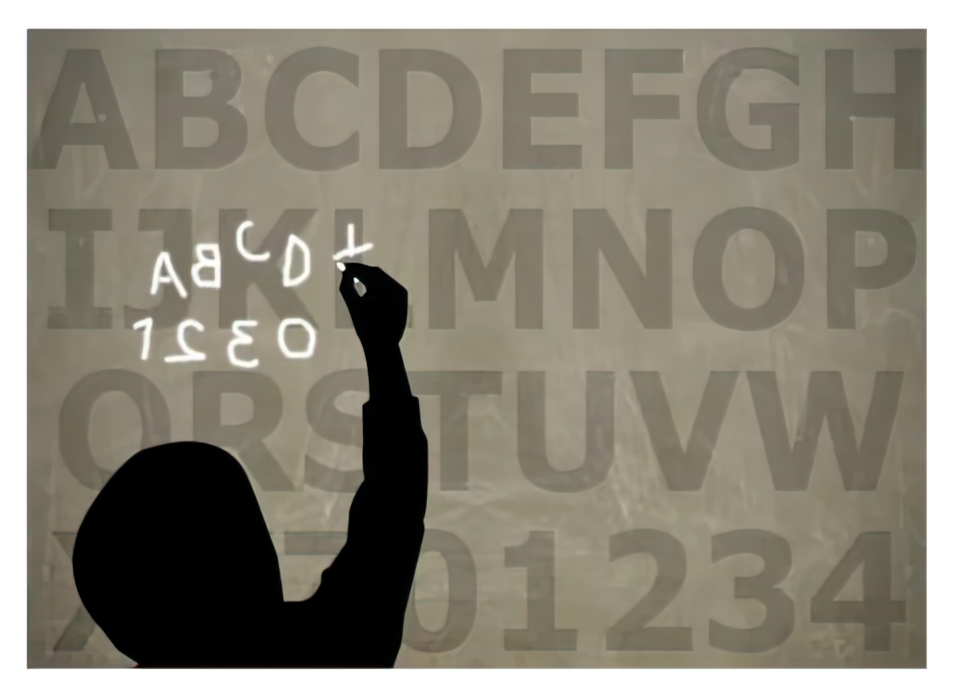
Dyslexia involves difficulties in processing letters and words.

Dyslexia is a disorder characterized by problems with the visual notation of speech, which in most languages of European origin are problems with alphabet writing systems which have a phonetic construction. Examples of these issues can be problems speaking in full sentences, problems correctly articulating Rs and Ls as well as Ms and Ns, mixing up sounds in multi-syllabic words (ex: aminal for animal, spahgetti for spaghetti, heilcopter for helicopter, hangaberg for hamburger, ageen for magazine, etc.), problems of immature speech such as "wed and gween" instead of "red and green".

The characteristics of dyslexia have been identified mainly from research in languages with alphabetic writing systems, primarily English. However, many of these characteristic may be transferable to other types of writing systems.

The causes of dyslexia are not agreed upon, although the consensus of neuroscientists believe dyslexia is a phonological processing disorder and that dyslexics have reading difficulties because they are unable to see or hear a word, break it down to discrete sounds, and then associate each sound with letters that make up the word. Some researchers believe that a subset of dyslexics have visual deficits in addition to deficits in phoneme processing, but this view is not universally accepted. In any case, there is no evidence that dyslexics literally "see" letters backward or in reverse order within words. Dyslexia is a language disorder, not a vision disorder.

Poor working memory may be another reason why those with dyslexia have difficulties remembering new vocabulary words. Remembering verbal instructions may also be a struggle. Dyslexics who have not been given structured language instruction may grow to depend on learning individual words by memory rather than decoding words by mapping phonemes (speech sounds) to graphemes (letters and letter combinations which represent individual speech sounds).

== Listening, speech and language ==
Some shared symptoms of the speech or hearing deficits and dyslexia:

1. Confusion with before/after, right/left, and so on
2. Difficulty learning the alphabet
3. Difficulty with word retrieval or naming problems
4. Difficulty identifying or generating rhyming words, or counting syllables in words (phonological awareness)
5. Difficulty with hearing and manipulating sounds in words (phonemic awareness)
6. Difficulty distinguishing different sounds in words (auditory discrimination)
7. Difficulty in learning the sounds of letters (In alphabetic writing systems)
8. Difficulty associating individual words with their correct meanings
9. Difficulty with time keeping and concept of time
10. Confusion with combinations of words
11. Difficulty in organization skills

The identification of these factors results from the study of patterns across many clinical observations of dyslexic children. In the UK, Thomas Richard Miles was important in such work, and his observations led him to develop the Bangor Dyslexia Diagnostic Test.

== Reading and spelling ==
In terms of reading and spelling, it is found that common characteristics include:

- Spelling errors — Because of difficulty learning letter-sound correspondences, individuals with dyslexia might tend to misspell words, or leave vowels out of words.
- Letter order — People with dyslexia may also reverse the order of two letters, especially when the final, incorrect, word looks similar to the intended word.
- Letter addition/subtraction — People with dyslexia may perceive a word with letters added, subtracted, or repeated. This can lead to confusion between two words containing most of the same letters.
- Highly phoneticized spelling — People with dyslexia also commonly spell words inconsistently, but in a highly phonetic form, such as writing "shud" for "should". Dyslexic individuals also typically have difficulty distinguishing among homophones such as "their" and "there".
- Seeing words backwards sometimes — a person sometimes might see the words backwards.

== Writing and motor skills ==
Dyslexia can affect writing skills as well. Research shows that it is reflected in poor spelling, limited vocabulary, poor idea development, and a lack of organisation. Writing depends on spelling, memory, and planning, which is often a weak spot for people with dyslexia. Requirements for coherent writing often feel overwhelming, like trying to stay on topic, keeping ideas in order, connecting ideas smoothly, and planning what to write. People with dyslexia process their reading the same way they process their writing; for example, the sound of words and matching the sound to letters. This can lead to frequent mistakes in their writing, for the same reasons they often encounter difficulties when reading.

Because of literacy problems, an individual with dyslexia may have difficulty with handwriting. This can involve slower writing speed than average, poor handwriting characterized by irregularly formed letters, or inability to write straight on a blank paper with no guideline.

Some studies have also reported gross motor difficulties in dyslexia, including motor skills disorder. This difficulty is indicated by clumsiness and poor coordination. The relationship between motor skills and reading difficulties is poorly understood, but could be linked to the role of the cerebellum and inner ear in the development of reading and motor abilities.

== Mathematical abilities ==
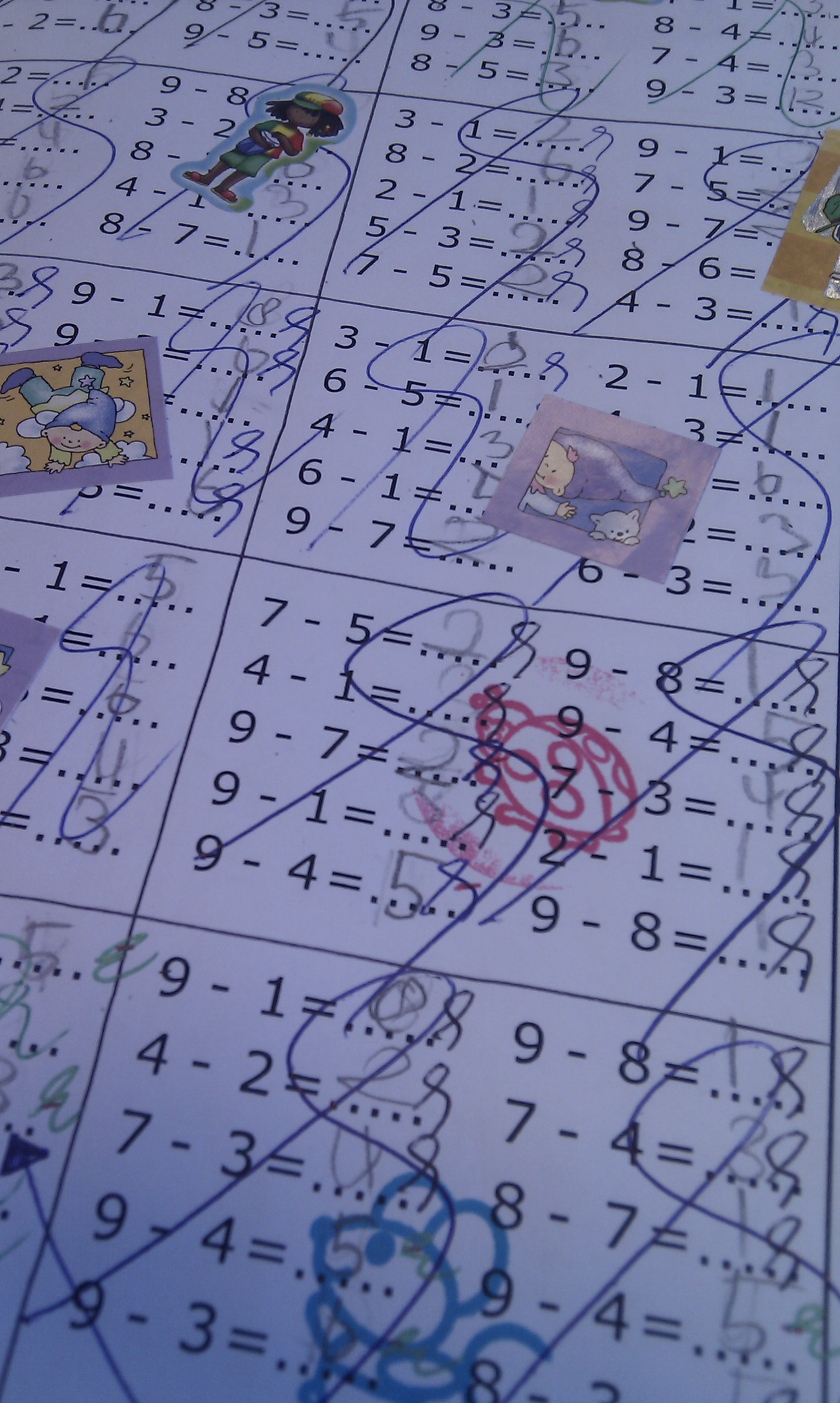
An arithmetic worksheet filled out in pencil by a dyscalculic child. The pen marks are flourishes of approval added by the teacher.

Dyslexia and dyscalculia are two learning disorders with different cognitive profiles. Dyslexia and dyscalculia have separable cognitive profiles, mainly a phonological deficit in the case of dyslexia and a deficient number module in the case of dyscalculia.

Individuals with dyslexia can be gifted in mathematics while having poor reading skills. They might have difficulty with word processing problems (e.g. descriptive mathematics, engineering or physics problems that rely on written text rather than numbers or formulas).

== Adaptive attributes ==
A study has found that entrepreneurs are five times more likely to be dyslexic than average citizens.

In the United States, researchers estimate the prevalence of dyslexia to range from three to ten percent of school-aged children, though some have put the figure as high as 17 percent. Recent studies indicate that dyslexia is particularly prevalent among small business owners, with roughly 20 to 35 percent of US and British entrepreneurs being affected.

Evidence based on randomly selected populations of children indicate that dyslexia affects boys and girls equally; that dyslexia is diagnosed more frequently in boys appears to be the result of sampling bias in school-identified sample populations.
