= ABCC5 =

Protein-coding gene in the species Homo sapiens

Identifiers
- Aliases: ABCC5, ABC33, EST277145, MOAT-C, MOATC, MRP5, SMRP, pABC11, ATP binding cassette subfamily C member 5
- External IDs: OMIM: 605251; MGI: 1351644; GeneCards: ABCC5
Enzyme activity
EC #	BRENDA	ExPASy	KEGG	MetaCyc
7.6.2.2	↗	↗	↗	↗

Gene location (Human)
Chr.	Chromosome 3 (human)
Band	3q27.1	Start	183,919,934 bp
Band	3q27.1	End	184,017,939 bp

Gene location (Mouse)
Chr.	Chromosome 16 (mouse)
Band	16 A3|16 12.41 cM	Start	20,150,053 bp
Band	16 A3|16 12.41 cM	End	20,245,144 bp
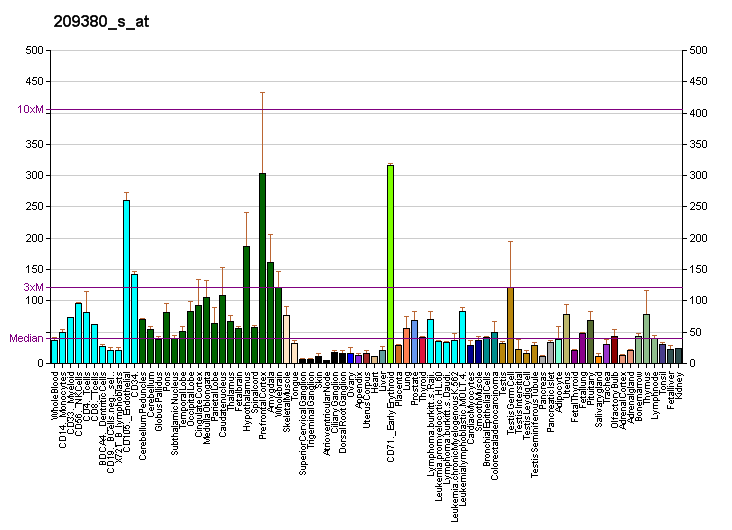
RNA expression pattern
Bgee	Human / Mouse (ortholog); Top expressed in: right hemisphere of cerebellum; middle temporal gyrus; gastrocnemius muscle; retinal pigment epithelium; tibialis anterior muscle; apex of heart; primary visual cortex; muscle of thigh; Brodmann area 23; right frontal lobe / Top expressed in: superior frontal gyrus; yolk sac; neural layer of retina; granulocyte; primary visual cortex; dentate gyrus of hippocampal formation granule cell; gastrula; decidua; muscle of thigh; cerebellar cortex; More reference expression data
BioGPS	More reference expression data
Gene ontology
Molecular function	nucleotide binding; organic anion transmembrane transporter activity; ATPase activity; ATP binding; ATPase-coupled inorganic anion transmembrane transporter activity; ATPase-coupled transmembrane transporter activity
Cellular component	integral component of membrane; plasma membrane; integral component of plasma membrane; membrane
Biological process	hyaluronan biosynthetic process; organic anion transport; transmembrane transport
Sources:Amigo / QuickGO
Orthologs
Databases	NCBI: entry; OMA: entry
Species	Human	Mouse
Entrez	10057	27416
Ensembl	ENSG00000114770	ENSMUSG00000022822
UniProt	O15440	Q9R1X5
RefSeq (mRNA)	NM_001023587; NM_005688; NM_001320032	NM_013790; NM_176839
RefSeq (protein)	NP_001018881; NP_001306961; NP_005679	NP_038818; NP_789809
Location (UCSC)	Chr 3: 183.92 – 184.02 Mb	Chr 16: 20.15 – 20.25 Mb
PubMed search
- Wikidata
View/Edit Human	View/Edit Mouse

Multidrug resistance-associated protein 5 is a protein that in humans is encoded by the ABCC5 gene.

== Function ==
The protein encoded by this gene is a member of the superfamily of ATP-binding cassette (ABC) transporters. ABC proteins transport various molecules across extra- and intra-cellular membranes. ABC genes are divided into seven distinct subfamilies (ABC1, MDR/TAP, MRP, ALD, OABP, GCN20, White). This protein is a member of the MRP subfamily which is involved in multi-drug resistance.

This protein functions in the cellular export of its substrate, cyclic nucleotides. This export contributes to the degradation of phosphodiesterases and possibly an elimination pathway for cyclic nucleotides.

Studies show that this protein provides resistance to thiopurine anticancer drugs, 6-mercaptopurine and thioguanine, and the anti-HIV drug 9-(2-phosphonylmethoxyethyl)adenine. This protein may be involved in resistance to thiopurines in acute lymphoblastic leukemia and antiretroviral nucleoside analogs in HIV-infected patients.

Alternative splicing of this gene has been detected; however, the complete sequence and translation initiation site is unclear.

== Interactive pathway map ==
Click on genes, proteins and metabolites below to link to respective articles. (Note: The interactive pathway map can be edited at WikiPathways: "FluoropyrimidineActivity_WP1601".)

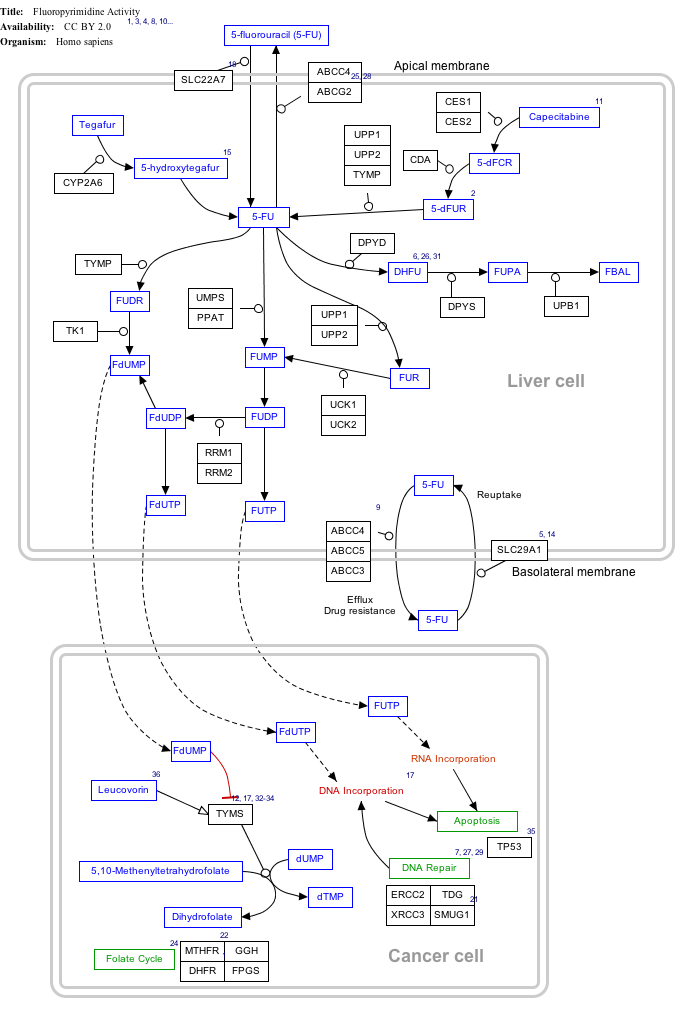

Fluorouracil (5-FU) Activity edit

== See also ==
- ATP-binding cassette transporter
