= GDI2 =

Protein-coding gene in the species Homo sapiens

Identifiers
- Aliases: GDI2, HEL-S-46e, RABGDIB, GDP dissociation inhibitor 2
- External IDs: OMIM: 600767; MGI: 99845; GeneCards: GDI2

Gene location (Human)
Chr.	Chromosome 10 (human)
Band	10p15.1	Start	5,765,223 bp
Band	10p15.1	End	5,842,132 bp

Gene location (Mouse)
Chr.	Chromosome 13 (mouse)
Band	13|13 A1	Start	3,588,063 bp
Band	13|13 A1	End	3,617,871 bp
RNA expression pattern
Bgee	Human / Mouse (ortholog); Top expressed in: jejunal mucosa; mucosa of ileum; mucosa of sigmoid colon; corpus epididymis; trabecular bone; visceral pleura; parietal pleura; secondary oocyte; epithelium of nasopharynx; oral cavity / Top expressed in: saccule; otic placode; renal corpuscle; mandibular prominence; maxillary prominence; otic vesicle; condyle; fossa; medullary collecting duct; internal carotid artery; More reference expression data
BioGPS	n/a
Gene ontology
Molecular function	Rab GDP-dissociation inhibitor activity; GTPase activator activity; small GTPase binding; protein binding; GDP-dissociation inhibitor activity; RNA binding
Cellular component	cytoplasm; vesicle; cytosol; membrane; focal adhesion; extracellular exosome; extracellular region; secretory granule lumen; azurophil granule lumen; Golgi apparatus; synapse
Biological process	positive regulation of GTPase activity; protein transport; regulation of catalytic activity; regulation of small GTPase mediated signal transduction; vesicle-mediated transport; signal transduction; small GTPase mediated signal transduction; neutrophil degranulation
Sources:Amigo / QuickGO
Orthologs
Databases	NCBI: entry; OMA: entry
Species	Human	Mouse
Entrez	2665	14569
Ensembl	ENSG00000057608	ENSMUSG00000021218
UniProt	P50395; Q5SX91	Q61598
RefSeq (mRNA)	NM_001494; NM_001115156	NM_008112
RefSeq (protein)	NP_001108628; NP_001485	NP_032138
Location (UCSC)	Chr 10: 5.77 – 5.84 Mb	Chr 13: 3.59 – 3.62 Mb
PubMed search
- Wikidata
View/Edit Human	View/Edit Mouse

Rab GDP dissociation inhibitor beta is a protein that in humans is encoded by the GDI2 gene.

GDP dissociation inhibitors are proteins that regulate the GDP-GTP exchange reaction of members of the rab family, small GTP-binding proteins of the ras superfamily, that are involved in vesicular trafficking of molecules between cellular organelles. GDIs slow the rate of dissociation of GDP from rab proteins and release GDP from membrane-bound rabs. GDI2 is ubiquitously expressed. The GDI2 gene contains many repetitive elements indicating that it may be prone to inversion/deletion rearrangements.
