= ABCC3 =

Protein-coding gene in the species Homo sapiens

Identifiers
- Aliases: ABCC3, ABC31, EST90757, MLP2, MOAT-D, MRP3, cMOAT2, ATP binding cassette subfamily C member 3
- External IDs: OMIM: 604323; MGI: 1923658; GeneCards: ABCC3
Enzyme activity
EC #	BRENDA	ExPASy	KEGG	MetaCyc
7.6.2.2	↗	↗	↗	↗
7.6.2.3	↗	↗	↗	↗

Gene location (Mouse)
Chr.	Chromosome 11 (mouse)
Band	11|11 D	Start	94,234,121 bp
Band	11|11 D	End	94,283,823 bp
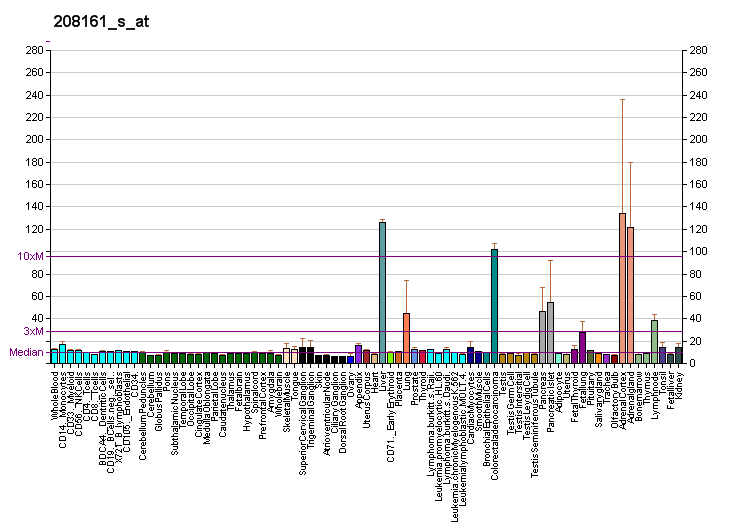

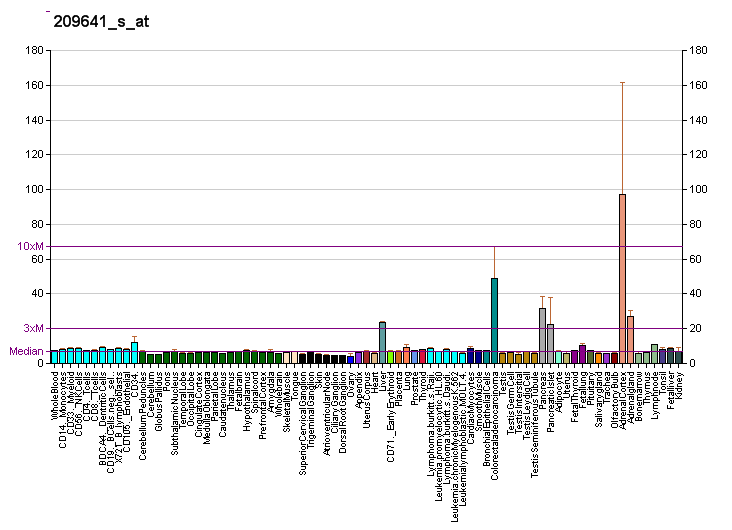
RNA expression pattern
Bgee	Human / Mouse (ortholog); Top expressed in: pancreatic ductal cell; right adrenal gland; left adrenal gland; right lobe of liver; body of pancreas; gallbladder; rectum; duodenum; body of stomach; pylorus / Top expressed in: transitional epithelium of urinary bladder; spermatid; left lobe of liver; Ileal epithelium; gastric mucosa; mucous cell of stomach; spermatocyte; epithelium of stomach; stroma of bone marrow; duodenum; More reference expression data
BioGPS	More reference expression data
Gene ontology
Molecular function	ATPase-coupled transmembrane transporter activity; nucleotide binding; organic anion transmembrane transporter activity; ATPase activity; ATP binding; ATPase-coupled inorganic anion transmembrane transporter activity; ABC-type bile acid transporter activity; ABC-type xenobiotic transporter activity; transmembrane transporter activity
Cellular component	integral component of membrane; plasma membrane; membrane; basolateral plasma membrane; integral component of plasma membrane; vacuolar membrane
Biological process	transmembrane transport; bile acid and bile salt transport; xenobiotic transmembrane transport; xenobiotic transport; canalicular bile acid transport; organic anion transport
Sources:Amigo / QuickGO
Orthologs
Databases	NCBI: entry
Species	Human	Mouse
Entrez	8714	76408
Ensembl	n/a	ENSMUSG00000020865
UniProt	O15438	B2RX12
RefSeq (mRNA)	NM_001144070; NM_003786; NM_020037; NM_020038	NM_029600; NM_001363187; NM_001363189
RefSeq (protein)	NP_001137542; NP_003777	NP_083876; NP_001350116; NP_001350118
Location (UCSC)	n/a	Chr 11: 94.23 – 94.28 Mb
PubMed search
- Wikidata
View/Edit Human	View/Edit Mouse

Canalicular multispecific organic anion transporter 2 is a protein that in humans is encoded by the ABCC3 gene.

== Function ==
The protein encoded by this gene is a member of the superfamily of ATP-binding cassette (ABC) transporters. ABC proteins transport various molecules across extra- and intra-cellular membranes. ABC genes are divided into seven distinct subfamilies (ABC1, MDR/TAP, MRP, ALD, OABP, GCN20, White). This protein is a member of the MRP subfamily which is involved in multi-drug resistance. The specific function of this protein has not yet been determined; however, this protein may play a role in the transport of biliary and intestinal excretion of organic anions. Alternatively spliced variants which encode different protein isoforms have been described; however, not all variants have been fully characterized.

ABCC3 is induced as a hepatoprotective response to a variety of pathologic liver conditions. The constitutive androstane receptor, pregnane X receptor and nuclear factor (erythroid-derived 2)-like 2 (Nrf2) transcription factors are involved in mediating induction. A functional antioxidant response element in the 8th intron of the human ABCC3 gene appears responsible for Nrf2-mediated induction in response to oxidative stress.

== Interactive pathway map ==
Click on genes, proteins and metabolites below to link to respective articles. (Note: The interactive pathway map can be edited at WikiPathways: "FluoropyrimidineActivity_WP1601".)

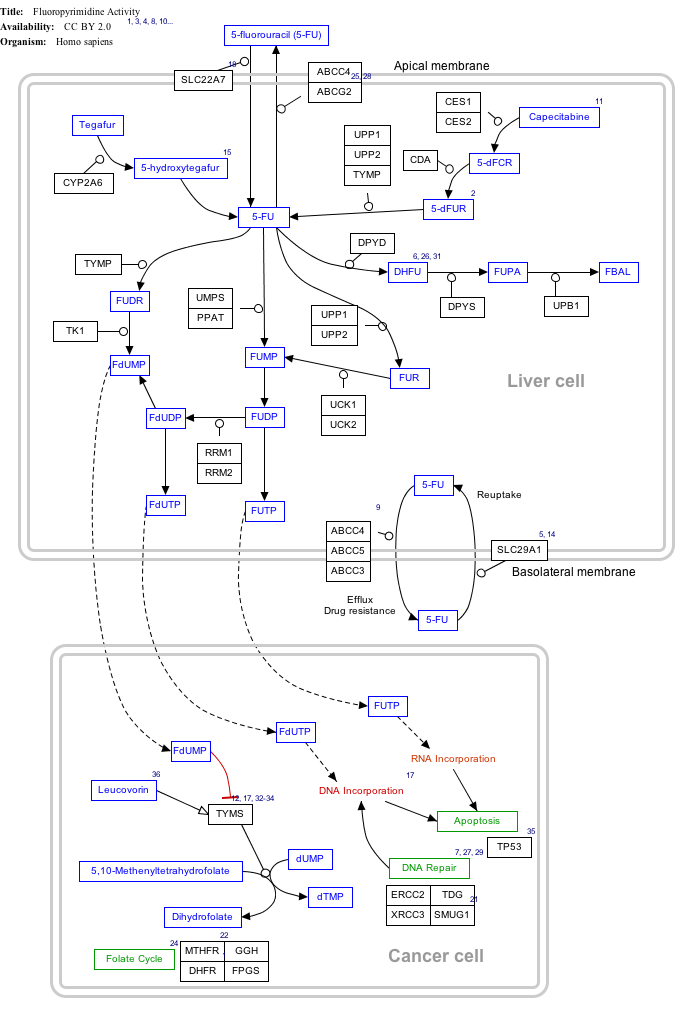

Fluorouracil (5-FU) Activity edit

== See also ==
- ATP-binding cassette transporter
