= Double deficit (education) =

Form of dyslexia

The double-deficit theory of dyslexia proposes that a deficit in two essential skills gives rise to the lowest level of reading performances, constituting the most severe form of dyslexia.

== Reading ability ==
The ability to read is believed to depend on two skills:

- Phonological processing skills make up the ability to identify and manipulate sounds in speech.
- Rapid automatized naming compose the ability to translate visual information whether of letters, objects or pictures into a phonological code.
