= ZNF385D =

Protein-coding gene in the species Homo sapiens

Identifiers
- Aliases: ZNF385D, ZNF659, zinc finger protein 385D
- External IDs: GeneCards: ZNF385D
RNA expression pattern
Bgee	Human / Mouse (ortholog); Top expressed in: ascending aorta; endothelial cell; left coronary artery; Achilles tendon; Brodmann area 23; right coronary artery; cerebellar cortex; cerebellar hemisphere; middle temporal gyrus; popliteal artery / n/a; More reference expression data
BioGPS	n/a
Gene ontology
Molecular function	zinc ion binding; p53 binding; metal ion binding; RNA binding; nucleic acid binding
Cellular component	nucleus
Biological process	intrinsic apoptotic signaling pathway by p53 class mediator
Sources:Amigo / QuickGO
Orthologs
Databases	NCBI: entry
Species	Human	Mouse
Entrez	79750	n/a
Ensembl	n/a	n/a
UniProt	Q9H6B1	n/a
RefSeq (mRNA)	NM_024697	n/a
RefSeq (protein)	NP_078973	n/a
Location (UCSC)	n/a	n/a
PubMed search		n/a
- Wikidata
View/Edit Human

ZNF385D is a gene on chromosome 3 that encodes for the zinc finger protein 385, a zinc finger protein. It has been implicated in dyslexia.
