= ABCC4 =

Protein-coding gene in the species Homo sapiens

Identifiers
- Aliases: ABCC4, MOAT-B, MOATB, MRP4, ATP binding cassette subfamily C member 4
- External IDs: OMIM: 605250; MGI: 2443111; GeneCards: ABCC4
Enzyme activity
EC #	BRENDA	ExPASy	KEGG	MetaCyc
7.6.2.2	↗	↗	↗	↗
7.6.2.3	↗	↗	↗	↗

Gene location (Human)
Chr.	Chromosome 13 (human)
Band	13q32.1	Start	95,019,835 bp
Band	13q32.1	End	95,301,475 bp

Gene location (Mouse)
Chr.	Chromosome 14 (mouse)
Band	14|14 E4	Start	118,720,104 bp
Band	14|14 E4	End	118,943,631 bp
RNA expression pattern
Bgee	Human / Mouse (ortholog); Top expressed in: palpebral conjunctiva; secondary oocyte; buccal mucosa cell; corpus epididymis; kidney tubule; mucosa of urinary bladder; Epithelium of choroid plexus; epithelium of nasopharynx; mucosa of sigmoid colon; stromal cell of endometrium / Top expressed in: transitional epithelium of urinary bladder; conjunctival fornix; Epithelium of choroid plexus; olfactory epithelium; lacrimal gland; iris; ciliary body; retinal pigment epithelium; cornea; lumbar spinal ganglion; More reference expression data
BioGPS	n/a
Gene ontology
Molecular function	nucleotide binding; ATPase activity; ATP binding; 15-hydroxyprostaglandin dehydrogenase (NAD+) activity; ATPase-coupled inorganic anion transmembrane transporter activity; P-type ion transporter activity; ATPase-coupled transmembrane transporter activity; protein binding
Cellular component	integral component of membrane; platelet dense granule membrane; membrane; plasma membrane; basolateral plasma membrane; integral component of plasma membrane
Biological process	prostaglandin secretion; platelet degranulation; response to organic cyclic compound; response to organic substance; positive regulation of smooth muscle cell proliferation; response to organonitrogen compound; transmembrane transport; cilium assembly; transport; ion transmembrane transport
Sources:Amigo / QuickGO
Orthologs
Databases	NCBI: entry; OMA: entry
Species	Human	Mouse
Entrez	10257	239273
Ensembl	ENSG00000125257	ENSMUSG00000032849
UniProt	O15439	E9Q236
RefSeq (mRNA)	NM_001105515; NM_001301829; NM_001301830; NM_005845	NM_001033336; NM_001163675; NM_001163676
RefSeq (protein)	NP_001098985; NP_001288758; NP_001288759; NP_005836	NP_001028508; NP_001157147; NP_001157148
Location (UCSC)	Chr 13: 95.02 – 95.3 Mb	Chr 14: 118.72 – 118.94 Mb
PubMed search
- Wikidata
View/Edit Human	View/Edit Mouse

ATP-binding cassette sub-family C member 4 (ABCC4), also known as the multidrug resistance-associated protein 4 (MRP4) or multi-specific organic anion transporter B (MOAT-B), is a protein that in humans is encoded by the ABCC4 gene.

ABCC4 acts as a regulator of intracellular cyclic nucleotide levels and as a mediator of cAMP-dependent signal transduction to the nucleus. MRP4/ABCC4 also transports prostaglandins, for example PGE2, out of the cell where they can bind receptors.

MRP4/ABCC4 expression is dysregulated in several cancers and is also upregulated in peritoneal endometriosis.

== Interactive pathway map ==
Click on genes, proteins and metabolites below to link to respective articles. (Note: The interactive pathway map can be edited at WikiPathways: "FluoropyrimidineActivity_WP1601".)

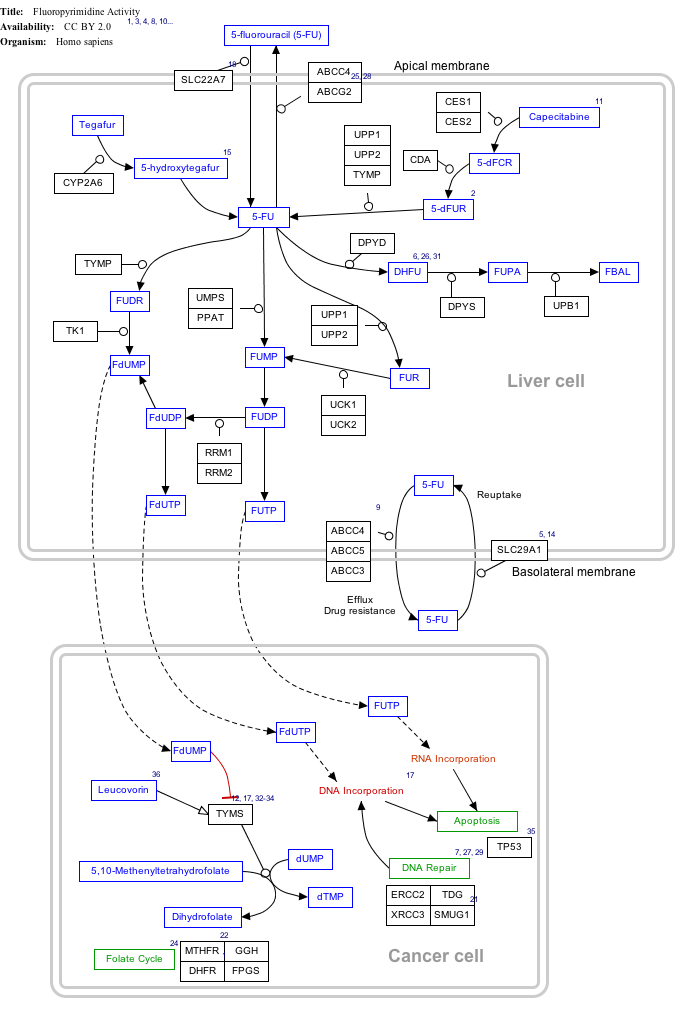

Fluorouracil (5-FU) Activity edit

== See also ==
- ATP-binding cassette transporter
