= Decoding Dyslexia =

Decoding Dyslexia is a grassroots movement focused on improving access to educational interventions for students with dyslexia in the public education system. Formed in 2011, the organization's mission is to "raise dyslexia awareness, to empower families to support their children and to inform policy-makers on best practices to identify, remediate and support students with dyslexia".

Decoding Dyslexia was established by several New Jersey parent advocates of dyslexic children. The organizational idea was conceived from the parents' conversations during a train ride to a luncheon hosted by the National Center for Learning Disabilities (NCLD) in New York City. Decoding Dyslexia originated in New Jersey and later expanded to all fifty U.S. states, Washington D.C., four Canadian provinces and Bermuda. The organization also has a specialized branch that serves military families.

Decoding Dyslexia raises awareness by using social media to connect with other families and people interested in changing the perception of dyslexia. The network of groups advocate for change locally in their respective states and in Washington D.C.
