= ABCB9 =

Protein-coding gene in humans

Identifiers
- Aliases: ABCB9, EST122234, TAPL, ATP binding cassette subfamily B member 9
- External IDs: OMIM: 605453; MGI: 1861729; GeneCards: ABCB9
Enzyme activity
EC #	BRENDA	ExPASy	KEGG	MetaCyc
7.4.2.6	↗	↗	↗	↗

Gene location (Human)
Chr.	Chromosome 12 (human)
Band	12q24.31	Start	122,920,951 bp
Band	12q24.31	End	122,981,649 bp

Gene location (Mouse)
Chr.	Chromosome 5 (mouse)
Band	5|5 F	Start	124,199,593 bp
Band	5|5 F	End	124,233,861 bp
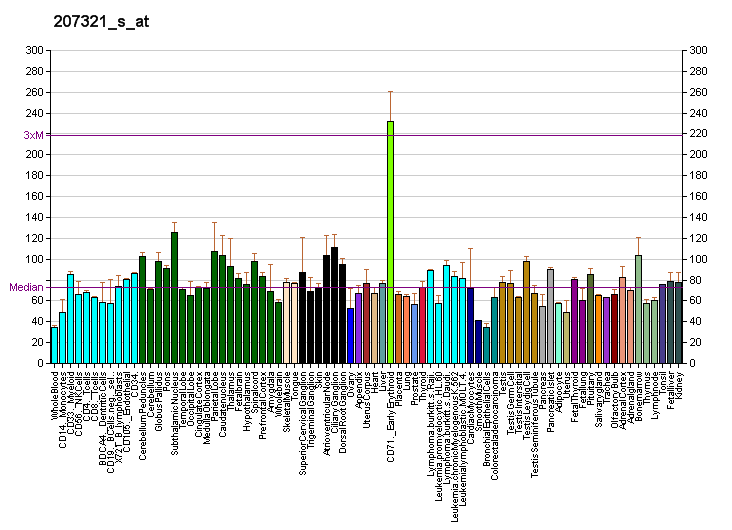

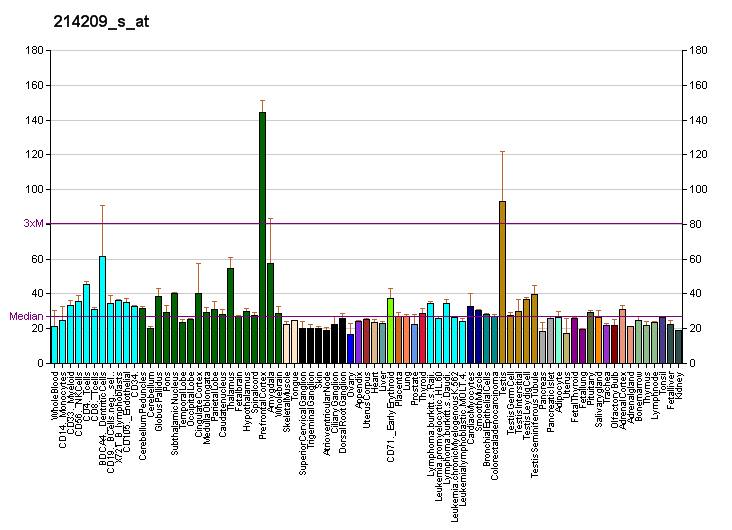
RNA expression pattern
Bgee	Human / Mouse (ortholog); Top expressed in: buccal mucosa cell; superficial temporal artery; dorsal motor nucleus of vagus nerve; right frontal lobe; male germ cell; right hemisphere of cerebellum; sperm; oocyte; prefrontal cortex; ventral tegmental area / Top expressed in: choroid plexus of fourth ventricle; perirhinal cortex; superior frontal gyrus; entorhinal cortex; primary visual cortex; cerebellar cortex; olfactory tubercle; primary motor cortex; CA3 field; medulla oblongata; More reference expression data
BioGPS	More reference expression data
Gene ontology
Molecular function	nucleotide binding; ATPase activity; protein homodimerization activity; transmembrane transporter activity; ABC-type oligopeptide transporter activity; ATP binding; ABC-type peptide transporter activity; ATPase-coupled transmembrane transporter activity; protein binding; peptide transmembrane transporter activity
Cellular component	integral component of membrane; early endosome; membrane; integral component of endoplasmic reticulum membrane; endoplasmic reticulum; lysosome; lysosomal membrane; intracellular membrane-bounded organelle
Biological process	transmembrane transport; peptide transport; antigen processing and presentation of peptide antigen via MHC class I; protein transport; oligopeptide transmembrane transport; transport
Sources:Amigo / QuickGO
Orthologs
Databases	NCBI: entry; OMA: entry
Species	Human	Mouse
Entrez	23457	56325
Ensembl	ENSG00000150967	ENSMUSG00000029408
UniProt	Q9NP78	Q9JJ59
RefSeq (mRNA)	NM_001243013; NM_001243014; NM_019624; NM_019625; NM_203444 NM_203445	NM_019875
RefSeq (protein)	NP_001229942; NP_001229943; NP_062570; NP_062571; NP_982269	NP_063928
Location (UCSC)	Chr 12: 122.92 – 122.98 Mb	Chr 5: 124.2 – 124.23 Mb
PubMed search
- Wikidata
View/Edit Human	View/Edit Mouse

ATP-binding cassette sub-family B member 9 is a protein that in humans is encoded by the ABCB9 gene.

The membrane-associated protein encoded by this gene is a member of the superfamily of ATP-binding cassette (ABC) transporters. ABC proteins transport various molecules across extra- and intra-cellular membranes. ABC genes are divided into seven distinct subfamilies (ABC1, MDR/TAP, MRP, ALD, OABP, GCN20, White). This protein is a member of the MDR/TAP subfamily. Members of the MDR/TAP subfamily are involved in multidrug resistance as well as antigen presentation. The function of this half-transporter has not yet been determined; however, this protein may play a role in lysosomes. Alternative splicing of this gene results in distinct isoforms which are likely to have different substrate specifications.

== See also ==
- ATP-binding cassette transporter
