= ABCC13 =

Pseudogene in the species Homo sapiens

Identifiers
- Aliases: ABCC13, C21orf73, PRED6, ABCC13P, ATP binding cassette subfamily C member 13 (pseudogene)
- External IDs: OMIM: 608835; GeneCards: ABCC13

Gene location (Human)
Chr.	Chromosome 21 (human)
Band	21q11.2	Start	14,236,206 bp
Band	21q11.2	End	14,362,754 bp
Orthologs
Databases	NCBI: entry; OMA: entry
Species	Human	Mouse
Entrez	150000	n/a
Ensembl	ENSG00000243064	n/a
UniProt	n a	n/a
RefSeq (mRNA)	NM_138726; NM_172024; NM_172025; NM_172026	n/a
RefSeq (protein)	n/a	n/a
Location (UCSC)	Chr 21: 14.24 – 14.36 Mb	n/a
PubMed search		n/a
- Wikidata
View/Edit Human

Putative ATP-binding cassette transporter sub-family C member 13 is a protein that is not present in humans. In humans, ABCC13 is a pseudogene.

== Function ==
This gene is a member of the superfamily of genes encoding ATP-binding cassette (ABC) transporters. ABC proteins transport various molecules across extra- and intra-cellular membranes. ABC genes are divided into seven distinct subfamilies (ABC1, MDR/TAP, MRP, ALD, OABP, GCN20, and White). This family member is part of the MRP subfamily, which is involved in multi-drug resistance, but the human locus is now thought to be a pseudogene incapable of encoding a functional ABC protein. Alternative splicing results in multiple transcript variants; however, not all variants have been fully described.

== See also ==
- ATP-binding cassette transporter
- ABCC13+protein,+human at the U.S. National Library of Medicine Medical Subject Headings (MeSH)
