= Orthographies and dyslexia =

Characteristics of dyslexia in writing

Dyslexia is a complex, lifelong disorder involving difficulty in learning to read or interpret words, letters and other symbols. Dyslexia does not affect general intelligence, but is often co-diagnosed with ADHD. There are at least three sub-types of dyslexia that have been recognized by researchers: orthographic, or surface dyslexia, phonological dyslexia and mixed dyslexia where individuals exhibit symptoms of both orthographic and phonological dyslexia. Studies have shown that dyslexia is genetic and can be passed down through families. Although it is a genetic disorder, there is no specific locus in the brain for reading and writing. The human brain does have language centers (for spoken and gestural communication), but written language is a cultural artifact, and a very complex one requiring brain regions designed to recognize and interpret written symbols as representations of language in rapid synchronization. The complexity of the system and the lack of genetic predisposition for it is one possible explanation for the difficulty in acquiring and understanding written language.

Furthermore, recent evidence has found that there are certain genes responsible for causing dyslexia. Research also suggests a clear genetic basis for developmental dyslexia with abnormalities in certain language areas of the brain. However, there is also evidence that orthography, the correspondence between the language's phonemes (sound units) and its graphemes (characters, symbols, letters), plays a significant role in the type and frequency of dyslexia's manifestations. Some psycholinguists believe that the complexity of a language's orthography (whether it has a high phoneme-grapheme correspondence or an irregular correspondence in which sounds do not clearly map to symbols) affects the severity and occurrence of dyslexia, postulating that a more regular system would reduce the number of cases of dyslexia and/or the severity of symptoms.

Current psycholinguistic models of dyslexia are "largely developed on the basis of alphabetic writing systems such as English", but the amount of research on some logographic orthographies, Chinese in particular, is also fairly significant. Unfortunately, little research has been done on syllabic writing systems, and "cross-linguistic studies of the acquired dyslexia and dysgraphias are scarce."

== Dyslexia and orthographic features ==
=== Orthographic Dyslexia ===
Orthographic dyslexia, a subtype of dyslexia, results in difficulty decoding and encoding skills due to slow and inaccurate rates of storing word and letter formations into memory. Orthographic dyslexics have difficulty storing mental representations of words, especially phonetically irregular words such as word spellings that end in -ight ("light" and "sight"). The problems underlying this type of dyslexia are related directly to memory and coding skills that allow representation of printed letters and words, not to poor phonological processing.

This type of dyslexia is also termed surface dyslexia because people with this type have the inability to recognize words simply on a visual basis. Words that are misspelled cause the readers difficulty because they attempt to sound out the words by looking at each individual letter rather than the word as a whole. So a reader might read the word "cat" and pronounce the "c" as a hard "c" but then read the word "ice" and pronounce the "c" as a hard "c" as well because they are sounding out each individual phoneme rather than just recognizing the word "ice" in its entirety.

Despite intervention, children with orthographic dyslexia continually have lower achievement reading levels when compared to their peers. Additionally, children show a greater difficulty throughout schooling when spelling words with irregular or unusual orthographies when compared to their other children. Research also shows that dyslexic children have primary difficulties in phonological processing and secondary difficulties in orthographic processing, aiding to the distinction of two subtypes.

=== The effects of orthographic depth on dyslexia ===
The complexity of a language's orthography is directly related to the difficulty of learning to read in that language. Orthographic complexity also contributes to how dyslexia manifests in readers of different languages.

Deep orthographies are writing systems, such as those of English and Arabic, that do not have a one-to-one correspondence between sounds (phonemes) and the letters (graphemes) that represent them.

Shallow orthographies, such as Italian and Finnish, have a close relationship between graphemes and phonemes, and the spelling of words is very consistent. With shallow orthographies, new readers have few problems learning to decode words and as a result children learn to read relatively quickly. Most dyslexic readers of shallow orthographic systems learn to decode words with relative ease compared to dyslexics using deep orthographies, though they continue to have difficulty with reading fluency and comprehension. The hallmark system of dyslexia in a shallow orthography is a comparatively slow speed of rapid automatized naming.

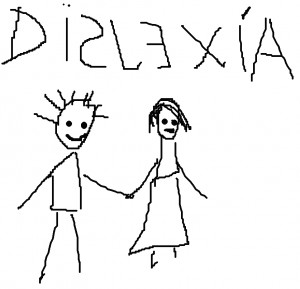
Writing and drawing performed by a child with dyslexia, displaying common behavioral symptoms.

For languages with relatively deep orthographies, such as English and French, readers have greater difficulty learning to decode new words than languages with shallow orthographies. As a result, children's reading achievement levels are lower. Research has shown that the hallmark symptoms of dyslexia in a deep orthography are a deficit in phonological awareness and difficulty reading words at grade level. For these dyslexic readers, learning to decode words may take a long time—indeed, in the deepest orthographies a distinctive symptom of dyslexia is the inability to read at the word level—but many dyslexic readers have fewer problems with fluency and comprehension once some level of decoding has been mastered.

Studies between the English and German (which has a shallower orthography than English) languages have shown that the greater depth of the English orthography has a "marked adverse effect on reading skills" among children with dyslexia, though the dyslexics in these studies still mostly underperformed compared to control groups. Other research, however, has suggested that all children with dyslexia still have the same reading difficulties despite different orthographies, including reading speed deficit and slow decoding mechanisms. These findings suggest that orthographic differences do not significantly impact the main difficulties those with dyslexia experience. Complicating this is the fact that different dyslexia tests often follow variable criteria.

== Dyslexia in different types of orthographies ==
There are a number of different types of writing systems, or orthographies, and they do not necessarily depend on the same neurological skill sets. As a result, certain dyslexic deficits may be more pronounced in some orthographies than in others. For example, in alphabetic languages, phonological awareness is highly predictive of reading ability. But in Chinese (a logographic system), orthographic awareness and motor programming are highly predictive of reading ability. However, literature reviews show that the type of orthography has little effect on rates of dyslexia compared to orthographic depth. For example, Chinese, which is a fully logographic orthography, has comparable rates of dyslexia (3.9%) to that of shallow alphabetic orthographies such as Italian (3.2%) while English, which is a deep alphabetic orthography, has much higher rates of up to 10%.

Type	Each symbol represents	Example	Predictive skill
Logographic	word or morpheme	Chinese characters	Orthographic awareness, motor programming, naming speed
Syllabic	syllable	Japanese kana	
Alphabetic	phoneme (consonant or vowel)	Latin alphabet	Phonological awareness, naming speed
Abugida	phoneme (consonant+vowel)	Indian Devanāgarī	Unknown
Abjad	phoneme (consonant)	Arabic alphabet	Unknown
Featural	phonetic feature	Korean hangul	Unknown

=== Dyslexia in alphabetic orthographies ===
Most of the current research on dyslexia focuses on alphabetic orthography.

Alphabetic writing systems vary significantly in the depth of their orthography. English and French are considered deep orthographies in comparison to Spanish and Italian which are shallow orthographies. A deep orthography like English has letters or letter combinations that do not reliably map to specific phonemes/sound units, and so are ambiguous in terms of the sounds that they represent whereas a transparent or shallow orthography has symbols that (more) uniquely map to sounds, ideally in a one-to-one correspondence or at least with limited or clearly signified (as with accent marks or other distinguishing features) variation. Literacy studies have shown that even for children without reading difficulties like dyslexia, a more transparent orthography is learned more quickly and more easily; this is true across language systems (syllabic, alphabetic, and logographic), and between shallow and deep alphabetic languages.

In cross-language studies, Aro and Wimmer report differences in developmental reading skills across several alphabetic orthographies. Among those tested, English children achieved only 50% accuracy in pseudoword testing by the end of first grade and did not attain high accuracy until fourth grade. However, in the same test, French, German, Dutch, Spanish, Swedish, and Finnish children all achieved scores approaching 85% and 90% in Grade 1 and Grade 4, respectively. This research provides evidence that orthographic irregularities, such as the "complex grapheme-phoneme relations" found in English, present significant difficulties in the reading development of children. However, the methodology of the experiment leaves doubt as to whether the scores correlate to actual reading ability on real words.

However, there is little evidence that a more "regular" orthographic system would significantly diminish the number of dyslexia cases. Because there is also a visual aspect to dyslexia, affected children often show symptoms such as mirror letter reversal (e.g. confusing "b" and "d"), which can manifest in any language regardless of orthographic depth.)

=== Dyslexia in logographic orthographies ===
Logographic writing systems (such as Chinese characters and Cuneiform) differ significantly from alphabetic systems in that the graphemes of a logographic system are logograms; that is, written characters represent morphemes, rather than phonemes. English is sometimes considered a partially logographic orthography. As a result, logographic systems require a comparatively large number of unique characters. This means that development of reading and writing skills in logographic systems depends more heavily on visual memorization than in alphabetic systems. Thus dyslexics, who often rely on grapheme memorization to cope with phonological awareness deficits, may show reduced difficulty in acquiring a language which uses a logographic system. However, logograms offer fewer phonological cues than alphabets and so have a more irregular orthography/grapheme-to-phoneme correspondence when compared with a more transparent system like an alphabet or syllabary.

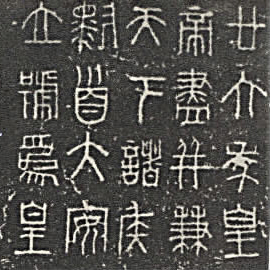
Archaic Chinese logograms

==== Chinese orthographies ====
Chinese children suffering dyslexia often have both a visuospatial and phonological disorder which are independent of one another. This implies that unlike alphabetic orthographies where only a phonological or visuospatial disorder alone can cause dyslexia, Chinese children must suffer from both disorders for dyslexia to manifest. This could be one possible explanation for the comparatively low rates of dyslexia in Chinese children.

With alphabetic writing systems, phonological awareness plays a central role in reading acquisition; while phonological awareness in Chinese is much less important. Rather, reading in Chinese is strongly related to a child's writing skills, which depend on orthographic awareness and on motor memory. In handling alphabetic languages with deep orthographies, the child must cope with having more than one spelling to represent a sound. In spoken Chinese, a single syllable is used in many different words, and a Chinese child must cope with having many written characters that represent the same syllable.

Further complicating the Chinese writing system, the Chinese character is made up of strokes and sub-character components, substantially increasing visual complexity. Thus orthographic processing is an important aspect of reading. Deficient orthography-to-meaning mapping can lead to reading disability. A key strategy in teaching children to read is to have children repeatedly write samples of single characters, thus building the child's awareness of a character's internal structure (orthographic awareness).

Rapid naming is one of the best single predictors of dyslexia in all languages tested, including both alphabetic and character-based writing systems. There is some evidence that the means of deciphering characters differs between logographic and alphabetic writing systems in the brain: logographic systems echo map-reading skills.

=== Dyslexia in syllabic orthographies ===
In a syllabary, written characters represent spoken syllables, whereas alphabetic systems use characters/letters to represent separate phonemes. A symbol in a syllabary typically has the canonical shape of a consonant-vowel (CV) combination. In the Japanese syllabaries, hiragana and katakana, there is a nearly one-to-one correspondence between morae and characters. The transparency of these syllabaries is the reason for their use in first teaching Japanese children to read before advancing to the complex logographic system of kanji, and by the age of five, prior to any official reading education, 89% of Japanese children can read the majority (60 or more out of 71) of hiragana characters.

Syllabary orthographies, like English orthography, can also be very irregular. However, little research has been done on how dyslexia presents in syllabic systems. One possible reason for this is that because of the different ways that dyslexia can present, the disorder may go unnoticed or not be recognized. A literacy study on children without reading disabilities found that syllabic scripts like Japanese katakana and hiragana, which are very transparent orthographically, are learned more quickly and with better proficiency than more orthographically opaque languages, followed in ease of use and learning by shallow alphabetic scripts that also have many phonological cues, then by complex alphabetic scripts that have irregular orthography (like English), and then by logographic scripts like kanji which have almost no phonological cues.

== See also ==
- Linguistics
- List of writing systems
- Writing system
- Written language
- Medium of instruction
- English orthography
