= ABCB7 =

Protein-coding gene in humans

Identifiers
- Aliases: ABCB7, AA517758, AU019072, Abc7, ASAT, Atm1p, EST140535, ATP binding cassette subfamily B member 7
- External IDs: OMIM: 300135; MGI: 109533; GeneCards: ABCB7

Gene location (Human)
Chr.	X chromosome (human)
Band	Xq13.3	Start	75,051,048 bp
Band	Xq13.3	End	75,156,732 bp

Gene location (Mouse)
Chr.	X chromosome (mouse)
Band	X D|X 46.58 cM	Start	103,324,263 bp
Band	X D|X 46.58 cM	End	103,457,462 bp
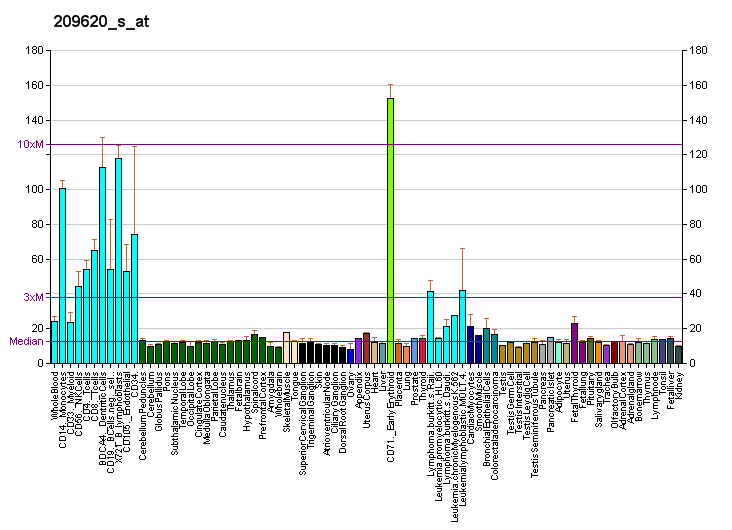
RNA expression pattern
Bgee	Human / Mouse (ortholog); Top expressed in: muscle of arm; biceps brachii; glutes; triceps brachii muscle; gastrocnemius muscle; Skeletal muscle tissue of biceps brachii; monocyte; left ventricle; muscle of thigh; jejunal mucosa / Top expressed in: digastric muscle; triceps brachii muscle; temporal muscle; sternocleidomastoid muscle; vastus lateralis muscle; tibialis anterior muscle; right ventricle; knee joint; soleus muscle; extraocular muscle; More reference expression data
BioGPS	More reference expression data
Gene ontology
Molecular function	nucleotide binding; heme transmembrane transporter activity; ATPase activity; ATPase-coupled transmembrane transporter activity; ATP binding
Cellular component	membrane; mitochondrial inner membrane; mitochondrion; integral component of membrane
Biological process	transmembrane transport; cellular iron ion homeostasis; heme transport
Sources:Amigo / QuickGO
Orthologs
Databases	NCBI: entry; OMA: entry
Species	Human	Mouse
Entrez	22	11306
Ensembl	ENSG00000131269	ENSMUSG00000031333
UniProt	O75027	Q61102
RefSeq (mRNA)	NM_004299; NM_001271696; NM_001271697; NM_001271698; NM_001271699	NM_009592
RefSeq (protein)	NP_001258625; NP_001258626; NP_001258627; NP_001258628; NP_004290 NP_001258627.1	NP_033722
Location (UCSC)	Chr X: 75.05 – 75.16 Mb	Chr X: 103.32 – 103.46 Mb
PubMed search
- Wikidata
View/Edit Human	View/Edit Mouse

ATP-binding cassette sub-family B member 7, mitochondrial is a protein that in humans is encoded by the ABCB7 gene.

== Function ==
The membrane-associated protein encoded by this gene is a member of the superfamily of ATP-binding cassette (ABC) transporters. ABC proteins transport various molecules across extra- and intra-cellular membranes. ABC genes are divided into seven distinct subfamilies (ABC1, MDR/TAP, MRP, ALD, OABP, GCN20, White). This protein is a member of the MDR/TAP subfamily. Members of the MDR/TAP subfamily are involved in multidrug resistance as well as antigen presentation. This gene encodes a half-transporter involved in the transport of heme from the mitochondria to the cytosol. With iron/sulfur cluster precursors as its substrates, this protein may play a role in metal homeostasis.

== Clinical significance ==
Mutations in this gene have been implicated in X-linked sideroblastic anemia with ataxia.

== Interactions ==
ABCB7 has been shown to interact with Ferrochelatase.

== See also ==
- ATP-binding cassette transporter
