= ABCB8 =

Protein-coding gene in the species Homo sapiens

Identifiers
- Aliases: ABCB8, EST328128, M-ABC1, MABC1, ATP binding cassette subfamily B member 8, MITOSUR
- External IDs: OMIM: 605464; MGI: 1351667; GeneCards: ABCB8

Gene location (Human)
Chr.	Chromosome 7 (human)
Band	7q36.1	Start	151,028,422 bp
Band	7q36.1	End	151,047,782 bp

Gene location (Mouse)
Chr.	Chromosome 5 (mouse)
Band	5|5 A3	Start	24,598,661 bp
Band	5|5 A3	End	24,615,052 bp
RNA expression pattern
Bgee	Human / Mouse (ortholog); Top expressed in: pancreatic ductal cell; apex of heart; right adrenal gland; right adrenal cortex; right lobe of thyroid gland; right hemisphere of cerebellum; anterior pituitary; left adrenal gland; left adrenal cortex; left lobe of thyroid gland / Top expressed in: spermatocyte; saccule; right ventricle; otic vesicle; muscle of thigh; right kidney; otic placode; superior frontal gyrus; dentate gyrus of hippocampal formation granule cell; secondary oocyte; More reference expression data
BioGPS	n/a
Gene ontology
Molecular function	transporter activity; ATPase activity; ATP binding; nucleotide binding; ATPase-coupled transmembrane transporter activity
Cellular component	integral component of membrane; mitochondrial envelope; ATP-binding cassette (ABC) transporter complex; nucleus; nucleolus; mitochondrion; mitochondrial inner membrane; membrane; mitochondrial membranes
Biological process	transmembrane transport
Sources:Amigo / QuickGO
Orthologs
Databases	NCBI: entry; OMA: entry
Species	Human	Mouse
Entrez	11194	74610
Ensembl	ENSG00000197150	ENSMUSG00000028973
UniProt	Q9NUT2	Q9CXJ4
RefSeq (mRNA)	NM_007188; NM_001282291; NM_001282292; NM_001282293	NM_029020
RefSeq (protein)	NP_001269220; NP_001269221; NP_001269222; NP_009119	NP_083296
Location (UCSC)	Chr 7: 151.03 – 151.05 Mb	Chr 5: 24.6 – 24.62 Mb
PubMed search
- Wikidata
View/Edit Human	View/Edit Mouse

ATP-binding cassette sub-family B member 8, mitochondrial is a protein that in humans is encoded by the ABCB8 gene.

The membrane-associated protein encoded by this gene is a member of the superfamily of ATP-binding cassette (ABC) transporters. ABC proteins transport various molecules across extra- and intra-cellular membranes. ABC genes are divided into seven distinct subfamilies (ABC1, MDR/TAP, MRP, ALD, OABP, GCN20, White). This protein is a member of the MDR/TAP subfamily. Members of the MDR/TAP subfamily are involved in multidrug resistance as well as antigen presentation. The function of this half-transporter has not yet been determined; however, it may involve the compartmentalization and transport of heme, as well as peptides, from the mitochondria to the nucleus and cytosol. This protein may also play a role in the transport of phospholipids into mitochondrial membranes.

== See also ==
- ATP-binding cassette transporter
- ABCB8+protein,+human at the U.S. National Library of Medicine Medical Subject Headings (MeSH)
