= Thomas Richard Miles =

British psychologist (1923–2008)

Thomas Richard Miles, T. R. Miles, more usually Tim Miles, (11 March 1923 – 11 December 2008) was Emeritus professor of psychology at Bangor University.

His research career was devoted to the study of developmental dyslexia as a constitutional disorder, likely to be "a form of aphasia", to the recognition that children with dyslexia have special education needs and that there should be a statutory obligation of schools to meet these, and, with his wife Elaine, to the development and evaluation of teaching methods to provide such support.

One of the first students in the institute of experimental psychology at Oxford University, he was much influenced by the eminent experimental psychologist Oliver Zangwill. His first lectureship was at University College of North Wales, Bangor in the departments of education and philosophy in 1949. He was appointed as the first professor of the new Department of Psychology at Bangor in 1963. He was a founder member of the British Dyslexia Association in 1972, and served as one of its vice-presidents. In 1974 he founded the Bangor Dyslexia Unit (now the Miles Dyslexia Centre) to recruit teachers, to train them in multi-sensory methods of training, and to organise their work in the community, in collaboration with Gwynedd and Anglesey Local Education Authorities.

Following his clinical observations of many single cases of developmental dyslexia and the consequent identification of the more common aspects of the syndrome, he developed the Bangor Dyslexia Diagnostic Test, first published in 1982 and now translated into a number of languages including Welsh and Japanese. He was founder of the journal Dyslexia.

He also wrote extensively on the nature of intelligence, linguistic philosophy, religion and science.

== Awards and recognition ==
- OBE Services to Dyslexia 2003

== Books ==
- On Helping the Dyslexic Children, 1970, Thomas Richard Miles, Elaine Miles.
- More Help for Dyslexic Children, T. R. Miles
- Dyslexia: the Pattern of Difficulties, 1983, T. R. Miles
- Understanding Dyslexia, 1987, T. R. Miles
- Dyslexia and Mathematics, 1991, T. R. Miles
- Dyslexia at College, 1995, D. E. Gilroy, T. R. Miles
- Dyslexia and Stress, 1995, V. Varma and T. R. Miles
- Dyslexia : A Hundred Years on, 1999, Thomas Richard Miles, Elaine Miles
- Fifty years in Dyslexia Research, 2006, Thomas Richard Miles
- Religious Experience, 1972, T. R. Miles
- Religion and the Scientific Outlook, 1959, T.R. Miles

== Obituaries ==
The Guardian 7 January 2009

Fawcett. A. (2009). Thomas Richard ‘Tim’ Miles Dyslexia, 15: 69–71. doi:10.1002/dys.387
