= Rapid automatized naming =

- Purpose: predict reading abilities

Rapid automatized naming (RAN) is a task that measures how quickly individuals can name aloud objects, pictures, colors, or symbols (letters or digits). Variations in rapid automatized naming time in children provide a strong predictor of their later ability to read, and is independent from other predictors such as phonological awareness, verbal IQ, and existing reading skills. Importantly, rapid automatized naming of pictures and letters can predict later reading abilities for pre-literate children.

== History ==
The concept of rapid automatized naming began with a study by Geshwind and Fusillo in 1966. They found some adults who had had a stroke were later unable to name colors despite being able to color match and having no evidence of color blindness. These individuals however were able to spell and write, indicating that their brain structures were intact and that they could generate the pathway from spoken words to visual and kinaesthetic representations. This visual-verbal disconnection led to a search for individuals who could not read and may be unable to name colors, primarily grade one students. It was found that in grade one students who could not read, color naming was possible but took much longer than color naming in children who could read.

The first color naming task was located in Ruesch and Wells Mental Examiner's Handbook (1972). It consisted of 50 squares of 5 primary colors repeated in random order 10 times. The test was originally administered as a timed continuous test at the bedside of individuals recovering from head injury.

Rapid automatized naming was first identified in 1974 as predicting reading abilities in young English readers between 5–11 years of age by Martha Bridge Denckla and Rita Rudel of Columbia University.

Faster times in RAN trials have been found to be a good indicator of reading competence, not only in alphabetic writing systems, but in writing systems such as Chinese logographs and Japanese kanji and hiragana. RAN testing has been shown to be effective in testing reader's fluency in languages with orthographically transparent alphabetic scripts such as German and Dutch. Timed reading tests of poor readers of transparent orthographies show very few reading errors; their main reading problem is slow, laborious decoding for words that are automatically read by their peers. This was also found for other readers in languages with consistent orthographies such as Spanish, Italian and Dutch. English is an inconsistent orthography because it has poor letter sound correspondences. English orthography and French orthography are also inconsistent because of their use of silent letters.

It has been found that continuous rapid naming of a list, compared to naming of single items, is easier for nondyslexic readers than it is for dyslexic ones. Despite this, Wimmer, Mayringer and Landerl (2000) suggest that the diagnosis of dyslexia in English readers often overlooks naming-speed deficit and that most studies rely on poor word recognition to diagnose reading disability.

== Types of RAN Testing ==
Rapid automatized naming can be used in many different ways. One of its strengths is flexibility in what types of stimuli categories it uses. Different categories consist of colors, digits, objects and letters. Researchers use RAN to test orthographic interpretation and phonological awareness. Two RAN tests are the CTOPP and TOWRE. Two formats of RAN testing are used, discrete and serial testing.

=== Serial Testing ===
Using a serial testing method, participants are shown a row or column of symbols and must name the symbols sequentially as fast as possible. An assumption made of serial RAN testing is that it consists of two components: articulation time (the mean time it takes to articulate the symbol), and pause time (the mean length of time between naming two adjacent symbols). When referring to pause time, this can include saccadic eye movements, disengagement from previously named symbols and focusing on upcoming symbols.

=== Discrete Testing ===
Using the discrete testing method, participants are shown symbols individually usually on a computer screen. In discrete RAN testing each individual symbols' naming latency is measured. The naming latency consists of the mean time from presentation to articulation of symbol. It is scored using the mean naming latency of all symbols. Some theorists believe that discrete RAN testing reflects the retrieval of phonological code from memory which can also be referred to as lexical access speed.

Some researchers argue that discrete testing is a better method because of individual differences in the reading speed of a list of sight words; the relationship of RAN and reading will be stronger if sight word reading speed is measured by discrete presentation.

== Criticism ==
Today RAN is frequently used as a clinical instrument for diagnosing reading disabilities in children. It is often used to predict category membership in reading group sub-types. Some concerns with diagnosis using rapid automatized naming arise because it assesses a wide range of cognitive skills. Speed and accuracy can be influenced by many different processing mechanisms and variables, including the perceived speed of the object to be named. Another concern is identifying which cognitive mechanisms are shared with reading. It is not clear whether RAN is testing orthographic knowledge or whether it is testing phonological processing.

== Theories ==
The role RAN plays in testing reading ability is contentious. Research supports the use of RAN as a measure of phonological processing, as a measure of orthographic processing and integration, and as a measure of reading ability. It has been suggested that RAN may link to reading because reading depends on object-naming circuits in the left cerebral hemisphere that are recruited in reading to underpin word-recognition abilities.

=== Orthographic and/or Phonological Processing ===
Little is known about the mediator variable between phonological awareness and RAN and the relationship between phonological awareness and RAN.

Researchers argue that RAN tests "the ability to retrieve phonological representations rapidly from long-term memory". Part of this view consists of RAN as tapping into the phonological system by measuring the rate of retrieval of phonological information in long-term memory. "The theoretical underpinnings being that, beyond the precision or accuracy of the grapheme–phoneme representations itself, rapid access to phonological representations is the main prerequisite to develop automaticity in reading a transparent writing system".

Others however dispute the link between RAN testing and phonological processing. They argue that phonological awareness is more strongly related to pure decoding ability, whereas naming speed appears to be more strongly related to reading fluency. Similarly, other researchers view RAN as a sub-process of phonological awareness. In this view RAN is seen as a task that draws on accessing phonological codes for effective execution. Although the relationship between RAN and phonological awareness is monotonic, these measures do not produce uniform changes. Instead, as reading skills increase or decrease, RAN and phonological awareness skills do not change uniformly.

An alternative view is that RAN plays a larger role in measuring orthographic processing. Here RAN is believed to measure processes that are important in gaining orthographic representations. Studies have been conducted where RAN has been seen to measure reading of different kinds of words. These researchers argue that "the relationship of RAN with reading should be higher if the reading task requires more orthographic knowledge." The results of some studies tend to support this prediction as stronger relationships were found with exception word reading.

Still other studies focus on the relationship between phonological processing and orthographic processing. "The fact that RAN as a predictor of reading and spelling was not affected by orthographic regularity seems to suggest that RAN is a compound skill that consists of several sub-processes that are related to early literacy development. These processes might very well imply both orthographical and phonological skills".

=== Reading Ability ===
There are several theories why rapid automatized naming is associated with reading abilities. One suggestion is that they both exploit the speed with which phonological representations are retrieved from long-term memory. Another related theory is that both depend on variations in the rate of development of a general cognitive speed of information processing. Evidence exists that RAN's contribution to reading ability decreases as we age. Longitudinal studies report that the contribution of naming speed to reading skills after grade 3 diminishes, whereas the contribution of phonological awareness remains constant.

The validity of RAN in measuring reading ability is based on three assumptions. First, that RAN deficits and phonological deficits are independent of one another. Secondly, the relationship between RAN and phonological awareness varies according to reading maturity. Finally, naming speed is a complex process involving processes beyond the phonological system.

Labelling RAN as a measure of reading ability ignores many complexities of the task. Schatschneider et al. argue "that rapid naming tasks are composed of attentional, visual, lexical, temporal, and recognition sub-processes that all contribute to naming speed performance. Lumping all these sub-processes under the category of phonological processes obscures the complexity of rapid naming tasks. Such a hypothesis is consistent with the finding that naming speed tasks consistently account for variance in early reading skills beyond that accounted for by measures of phonemic awareness".

Another viewpoint is that rapid automatized naming directly relates to differences in reading competence. Supporting this is the fact that the ability to rapidly name digits and letters predicts reading better than rapidly naming colors and objects. This suggests a difference due to differences in experience with letters. However, rapid automatized naming of colors, objects, numbers and letters measured in children before they learn to read predicts later differences in reading skill, while early differences in reading ability do not predict later differences in rapid automatized naming.

=== Double Deficit Hypothesis ===
It has been proposed that dyslexia is due to a "double-deficit hypothesis" in which phonological deficits and naming-speed deficits are two separate causes of reading problems, such that when they are combined, they produce a greater dyslexic defect than would be produced by either deficit individually.

The double-deficit hypothesis suggests that RAN and phonological awareness operate as independent systems that are equally important in word identification. This model is based on literature showing that phonological disabilities and naming speed-deficits underlie some forms of reading disabilities. In the case of modest or severe reading disability, the concurrence of both a phonological deficit and rapid naming deficit characterizes the most difficult forms of reading disabilities. These individuals score lowest on reading measures.
