= History of learning to read =

The history of learning to read dates back to the invention of writing during the 4th millennium BC. Concerning the English language in the United States, the phonics principle of teaching reading was first presented by John Hart in 1570, who suggested the teaching of reading should focus on the relationship between what is now referred to as graphemes (letters) and phonemes (sounds).

In the colonial times of the United States, reading material was not written specifically for children, so instruction material consisted primarily of the Bible and some patriotic essays. The most influential early textbook was The New England Primer, published in 1687. There was little consideration given to the best ways to teach reading or assess reading comprehension.

Phonics was a popular way to learn reading in the 1800s. William Holmes McGuffey (1800–1873), an American educator, author, and Presbyterian minister who had a lifelong interest in teaching children, compiled the first four of the McGuffey Readers in 1836.

The whole-word method was introduced into the English-speaking world by Thomas Hopkins Gallaudet, the director of the American School for the Deaf. It was designed to educate deaf people by placing a word alongside a picture. In 1830, Gallaudet described his method of teaching children to recognize a total of 50 sight words written on cards. Horace Mann, the Secretary of the Board of Education of Massachusetts, U.S., favored the method for everyone, and by 1837 the method was adopted by the Boston Primary School Committee.

By 1844 the defects of the whole-word method became so apparent to Boston schoolmasters that they urged the Board to return to phonics. In 1929, Samuel Orton, a neuropathologist in Iowa, concluded that the cause of children's reading problems was the new sight method of reading. His findings were published in the February 1929 issue of the Journal of Educational Psychology in the article "The Sight Reading Method of Teaching Reading as a Source of Reading Disability".

The meaning-based curriculum came to dominate reading instruction by the second quarter of the 20th century. In the 1930s and 1940s, reading programs became very focused on comprehension and taught children to read whole words by sight. Phonics was taught as a last resort.

Edward William Dolch developed his list of sight words in 1936 by studying the most frequently occurring words in children's books of that era. Children are encouraged to memorize the words with the idea that it will help them read more fluently. Many teachers continue to use this list, although some researchers consider the theory of sight word reading to be a "myth". Researchers and literacy organizations suggest it would be more effective if students learned the words using a phonics approach.

In 1955, Rudolf Flesch published a book entitled Why Johnny Can't Read, a passionate argument in favor of teaching children to read using phonics, adding to the reading debate among educators, researchers, and parents.

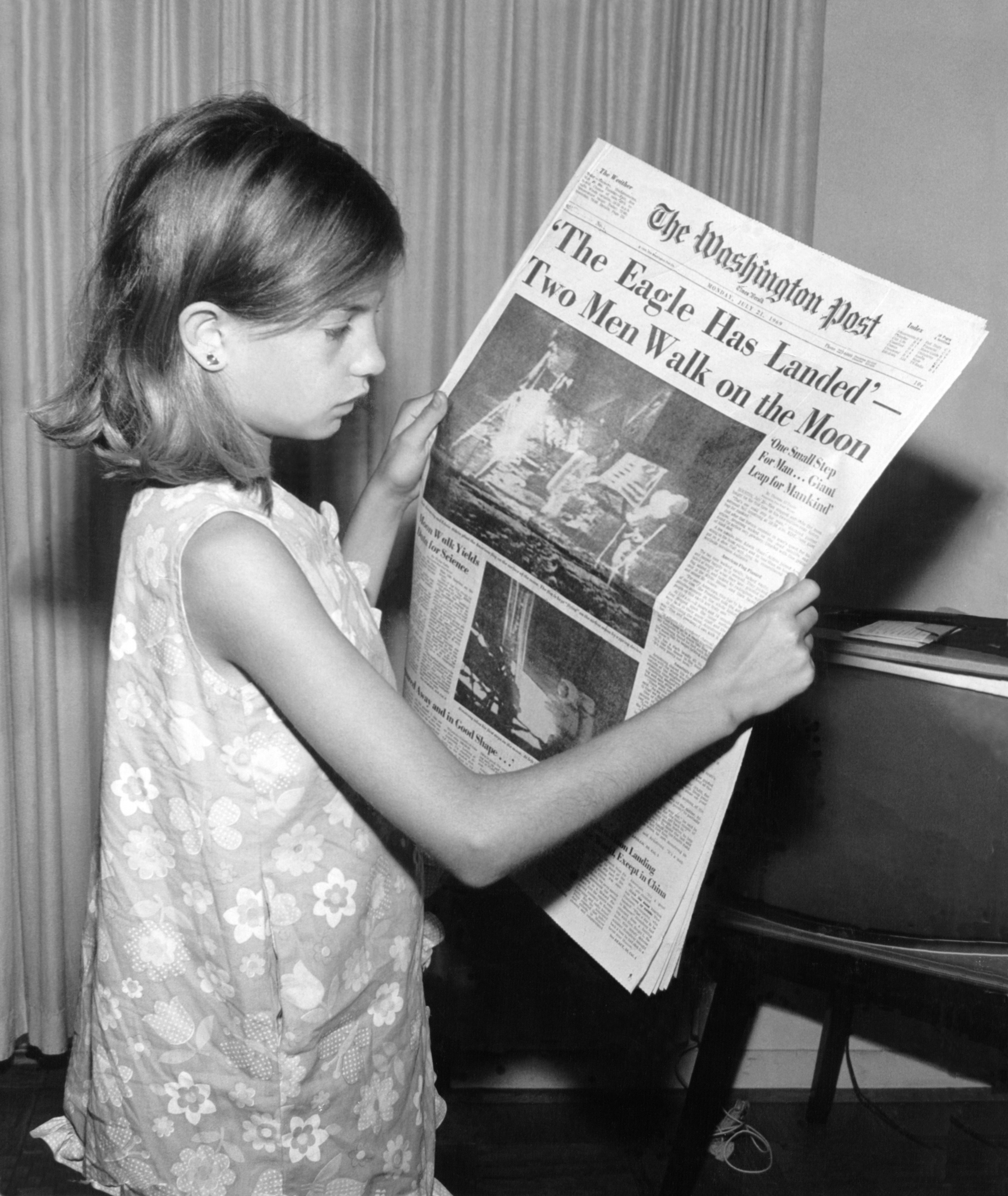
An American girl reading a newspaper (1969)

Government-funded research on reading instruction in the United States and elsewhere began in the 1960s. In the 1970s and 1980s, researchers began publishing studies with evidence on the effectiveness of different instructional approaches. During this time, researchers at the National Institutes of Health (NIH) conducted studies that showed early reading acquisition depends on the understanding of the connection between sounds and letters (i.e. phonics). However, this appears to have had little effect on educational practices in public schools.

In the 1970s, the whole language method was introduced. This method de-emphasizes the teaching of phonics out of context (e.g. reading books), and is intended to help readers "guess" the right word. It teaches that guessing individual words should involve three systems (letter clues, meaning clues from context, and the syntactical structure of the sentence). It became the primary method of reading instruction in the 1980s and 1990s. However, it is falling out of favor. The neuroscientist Mark Seidenberg refers to it as a "theoretical zombie" because it persists despite a lack of supporting evidence. It is still widely practiced in related methods such as sight words, the three-cueing system and balanced literacy.

In the 1980s, the three-cueing system (the searchlights model in England) emerged. According to a 2019 survey 75% of teachers in the United States teach the three-cueing system. It teaches children to guess a word by using "meaning cues" (semantic, syntactic and graphophonic). While the system does help students to "make better guesses", it does not help when the words become more sophisticated; and it reduces the amount of practice time available to learn essential decoding skills. Consequently, present-day researchers such as cognitive neuroscientists Mark Seidenberg and professor Timothy Shanahan do not support the theory. In England, synthetic phonics is intended to replace "the searchlights multi-cueing model".

In the 1990s, balanced literacy arose. It is a theory of teaching reading and writing that is not clearly defined. It may include elements such as word study and phonics mini-lessons, differentiated learning, cueing, leveled reading, shared reading, guided reading, independent reading and sight words. For some, balanced literacy strikes a balance between whole language and phonics. Others say balanced literacy in practice usually means the whole language approach to reading. According to a survey in 2019, 68% of K–2 teachers in the United States practice balanced literacy. Furthermore, only 52% of teachers included phonics in their definition of balanced literacy.

In 1996, the California Department of Education took an increased interest in using phonics in schools. And in 1997 the department called for grade one teaching in concepts about print, phonemic awareness, decoding and word recognition, and vocabulary and concept development.

By 1998, in the U.K. whole language instruction and the searchlights model were still the norm; however, there was some attention to teaching phonics in the early grades, as seen in the National Literacy Strategies.

== 21st century ==
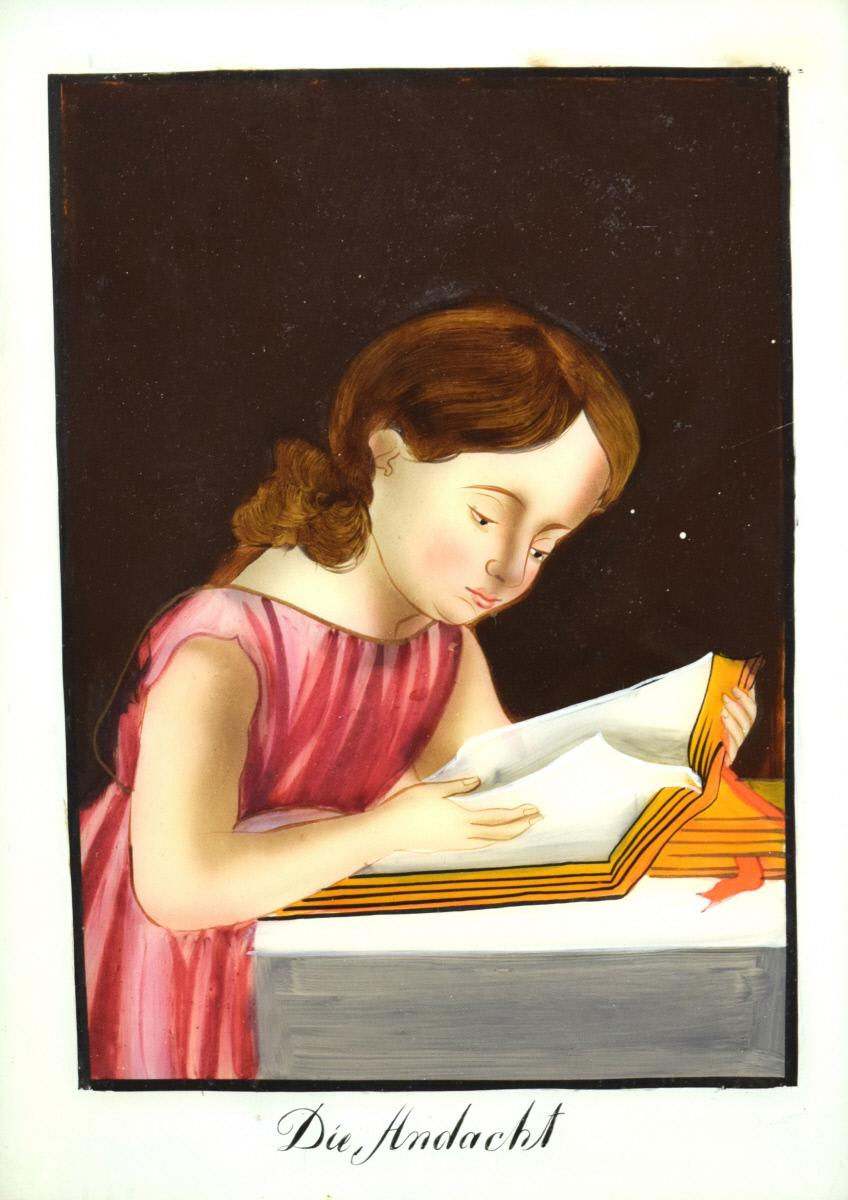
In 2000 the National Reading Panel in the U.S. identified five ingredients of effective reading instruction: phonemic awareness, phonics, fluency, vocabulary and comprehension.

Beginning in 2000, several reading research reports were published:

- 2000 – The National Reading Panel (U.S.) that identified five ingredients of effective reading instruction: phonemic awareness, phonics, fluency, vocabulary and comprehension.
- 2005 – The Australian report on Teaching reading that supports the use of systematic phonics.
- 2006 – The United Kingdom Independent review of the teaching of early reading (Rose Report 2006) that supports systematic synthetic phonics.

In Australia, the 2005 report, Teaching Reading, recommends teaching reading based on evidence and teaching systematic, explicit phonics within an integrated approach. The executive summary says "systematic phonics instruction is critical if children are to be taught to read well, whether or not they experience reading difficulties". As of October 5, 2018, The State Government of Victoria, Australia, publishes a website containing a comprehensive Literacy Teaching Toolkit including effective reading instruction, phonics, and sample phonics lessons.

In Scotland a seven-year study (the Clackmannanshire Report) was published in 2005. It compared analytic phonics with synthetic phonics and advantaged students with disadvantaged students. The report found that, using synthetic phonics children from lower socio-economic backgrounds performed at the same level as children from advantaged backgrounds in primary school (whereas with analytic phonics teaching, they did significantly less well.); and boys performed better than or as well as girls. A five-year follow-up of the study concluded that the beneficial effects were long-lasting, in fact the reading gains increased. Subsequently, Education Scotland concluded that explicit, systematic phonics programs, usually embedded in a rich literacy environment, give an additional four months progress over other programs such as whole language, and are particularly beneficial for young learners (aged 4–7). There is evidence, though less secure, that synthetic phonics programs may be more beneficial than analytic phonics programs; however, it is most important to teach systematically.

Until 2006, the English language syllabus of Singapore advocated "a balance between decoding and meaning-based instruction […] phonics and whole language". However, a review in 2006 advocated for a "systematic" approach. Subsequently, the syllabus in 2010 had no mention of whole language and advocated for a balance between "systematic and explicit instruction" and "a rich language environment". It called for increased instruction in oral language skills together with phonemic awareness and the key decoding elements of synthetic phonics, analytic phonics, and analogy phonics.

In 2007 the Department of Education (DE) in Northern Ireland was required by law to teach children foundational skills in phonological awareness and the understanding that "words are made up of sounds and syllables and that sounds are represented by letters (phoneme/grapheme awareness)". In 2010 the DE required that teachers receive support in using evidence-based practices to teach literacy and numeracy, including a "systematic programme of high-quality phonics" that is explicit, structured, well-paced, interactive, engaging, and applied in a meaningful context.

In 2008, the National Center for Family Literacy, with the National Institute for Literacy, published a report entitled Developing Early Literacy. It is a synthesis of the scientific research on the development of early literacy skills in children ages zero to five as determined by the National Early Literacy Panel that was convened in 2002. Amongst other things, the report concluded that code-focused interventions on the early literacy and conventional literacy skills of young children yield a moderate to large effect on the predictors of later reading and writing, irrespective of socioeconomic status, ethnicity, or population density.

In 2010 the Common Core State Standards Initiative was introduced in the United States. The English Language Arts Standards for Reading: Foundational Skills in Grades 1–5 include recommendations to teach print concepts, phonological awareness, phonics and word recognition, and fluency.

In the United Kingdom, a 2010 government white paper contained plans to train all primary school teachers in phonics. The 2013 curriculum has "statutory requirements" that, amongst other things, students in years one and two be capable in using systematic synthetic phonics in regards to word reading, reading comprehension, fluency, and writing. This includes having skills in "sound to graphemes", "decoding", and "blending".

United Nations Educational, Scientific and Cultural Organization (UNESCO)

In 2013, the National Commission for UNESCO launched the Leading for Literacy project to develop the literacy skills of grades 1 and 2 students. The project facilitates the training of primary school teachers in the use of a synthetic phonics program. From 2013 to 2015, the Trinidad and Tobago Ministry of Education appointed seven reading specialist to help primary and secondary school teachers improve their literacy instruction. From February 2014 to January 2016, literacy coaches were hired in selected primary schools to assist teachers of kindergarten, grades 1 and 2 with pedagogy and content of early literacy instruction. Primary schools have been provided with literacy resources for instruction, including phonemic awareness, word recognition, vocabulary manipulatives, phonics, and comprehension.

In 2013 the State of Mississippi passed the Literacy-Based Promotion Act. The Mississippi Department of Education provided resources for teachers in the areas of phonemic awareness, phonics, vocabulary, fluency, comprehension and reading strategies.

The school curriculum in Ireland focuses on ensuring children are literate in both the English language and the Irish language. The 2014 teachers' Professional Development guide covers the seven areas of attitude and motivation, fluency, comprehension, word identification, vocabulary, phonological awareness, phonics, and assessment. It recommends that phonics be taught in a systematic and structured way and is preceded by training in phonological awareness.

In 2014 the California Department of Education said children should know how to decode regularly spelled one-syllable words by mid-first grade, and be phonemically aware (especially able to segment and blend phonemes)". In grades two and three children receive explicit instruction in advanced phonic-analysis and reading multi-syllabic and more complex words.

In 2015 the New York State Public School system revised its English Language Arts learning standards, calling for teaching involving "reading or literacy experiences" as well as phonemic awareness from prekindergarten to grade 1 and phonics and word recognition for grades 1–4. That same year, the Ohio Legislature set minimum standards requiring the use of phonics including guidelines for teaching phonemic awareness, phonics, fluency, vocabulary and comprehension.

In 2016 the What Works Clearinghouse and the Institute of Education Sciences published an Educator's Practice Guide on Foundational Skills to Support Reading for Understanding in Kindergarten Through 3rd Grade. It contains four recommendations to support reading: 1) teach students academic language skills, including the use of inferential and narrative language, and vocabulary knowledge, 2) develop awareness of the segments of sounds in speech and how they link to letters (phonemic awareness and phonics), 3) teach students to decode words, analyze word parts, and write and recognize words (phonics and synthetic phonics), and 4) ensure that each student reads connected text every day to support reading accuracy, fluency, and comprehension.

In 2016 the Colorado Department of Education updated their Elementary Teacher Literacy Standards with standards for development in the areas of phonology, phonics and word recognition, fluent automatic reading, vocabulary, text comprehension, handwriting, spelling, and written expression. At the same time, the Department of Education in Delaware produced a plan to improve education results. It states that "students who aren't reading at grade level aren't able to comprehend up to half of the printed fourth-grade curriculum". Furthermore, it says a gap exists between what is known about how to teach reading and how teachers can teach reading. It goes on to say that teachers' preparation programs must include evidence-based practices, including the five essential components of reading instruction (phonemic awareness, phonics, fluency, vocabulary, and comprehension).

The European Literacy Policy Network (ELINET) 2016 reports that Hungarian children in grades one and two receive explicit instruction in phonemic awareness and phonics "as the route to decode words". In grades three and four they continue to apply their knowledge of phonics; however, the emphasis shifts to the more meaning-focused technical aspects of reading and writing (i.e., vocabulary, types of texts, reading strategies, spelling, punctuation, and grammar).

In 2017 the Ohio Department of Education adopted Reading Standards for Foundational Skills K–12 laying out a systematic approach to teaching phonological awareness in kindergarten and grade one, and grade-level phonics and word analysis skills in decoding words (including fluency and comprehension) in grades 1–5.

In 2018 the Arkansas Department of Education published a report about their new initiative known as R.I.S.E., Reading Initiative for Student Excellence, which was the result of The Right to Read Act, passed in 2017. The first goal of this initiative is to provide educators with the in-depth knowledge and skills of "the science of reading" and evidence-based instructional strategies. This included a focus on research-based instruction on phonological awareness, phonics, vocabulary, fluency, and comprehension; specifically systematic and explicit instruction.

As of 2018, the Ministry of Education in New Zealand has online information to help teachers support their students in years 1–3 in relation to sounds, letters, and words. It states that phonics instruction "is not an end in itself" and it is not necessary to teach students "every combination of letters and sounds".

Piper et al 2018 published the results of a study of early literacy and numeracy outcomes in developing countries entitled Identifying the essential ingredients to literacy and numeracy improvement: Teacher professional development and coaching, student textbooks, and structured teachers' guides. It concluded that "Including teachers' guides was by far the most cost-effective intervention".

There has been a strong debate in France on the teaching of phonics ("méthode syllabique") versus whole language ("méthode globale"). After the 1990s, supporters of the latter started defending a so-called "mixed method" (also known as Balanced literacy) in which approaches from both methods are used. Influential researchers in psycho-pedagogy, cognitive sciences, and neurosciences, such as Stanislas Dehaene and Michel Fayol have put their heavy scientific weight on the side of phonics. In 2018 the ministry created a science educational council that openly supported phonics. In April 2018, the minister issued a set of four guiding documents for early teaching of reading and mathematics and a booklet detailing phonics recommendations. Some have described his stance as "traditionalist", but he openly declared that the so-called mixed approach is no serious choice.

In 2019 the Minnesota Department of Education introduced standards requiring school districts to "develop a local literacy plan to ensure that all students have achieved early reading proficiency by no later than the end of third grade" by a Statute of the Minnesota Legislature requiring elementary teachers to be able to implement comprehensive, scientifically based reading and oral language instruction in the five reading areas of phonemic awareness, phonics, fluency, vocabulary, and comprehension.

Also in 2019, 26% of grade 4 students in Louisiana were reading at the proficiency level according to the Nation's Report Card, as compared to the National Average of 34%. In March 2019 the Louisiana Department of Education revised their curriculum for K–12 English Language Arts including requirements for instruction in the alphabetic principle, phonological awareness, phonics and word recognition, fluency and comprehension.

And again in 2019, 30% of grade 4 students in Texas were reading at the proficiency level according to the Nation's Report Card. In June of that year the Texas Legislature passed a Bill requiring all kindergarten through grade-three teachers and principals to "begin a teacher literacy achievement academy before the 2022–2023 school year". The required content of the academies' training includes the areas of The Science of Teaching Reading, Oral Language, Phonological Awareness, Decoding (i.e. Phonics), Fluency and Comprehension. The goal is to "increase teacher knowledge and implementation of evidence-based practices to positively impact student literacy achievement".

In 2021, the State of Connecticut passed an act concerning the "right to read" that will take effect in 2023. It requires education standards that are evidenced-based and scientifically based and focused on competency in the five areas of reading: phonemic awareness, phonics, fluency, vocabulary development, and reading fluency, including oral skills and reading comprehension. In the same year, the state of North Carolina passed a bill requiring that the teaching of reading be based on the science of reading.

In Canada, on January 27, 2022, the Ontario Human Rights Commission (OHRC) released a report on its public inquiry into the right to read. It followed the unanimous decision of the Supreme Court of Canada, on November 9, 2012, recognizing that learning to read is not a privilege, but a basic and essential human right.

The OHRC's report deals with all students, not just those with learning disabilities. The inquiry found that Ontario is not fulfilling its obligations to meet students' right to read. Specifically, foundational word-reading skills are not effectively targeted in Ontario's education system. With science-based approaches to reading instruction, early screening, and intervention, we should see only about 5% of students reading below grade level. However, in 2018–2019, 26% of all Ontario Grade 3 students and 53% of Grade 3 students with special education needs (students who have an Individual Education Plan), were not meeting the provincial EQAO standard. The results improved only slightly for Grade 6 students, where 19% of all students and 47% of students with special education needs did not meet the provincial standard.

The Ontario curriculum encourages the use of the three-cueing system and balanced literacy, which are ineffective because they teach children to "guess" the meaning of a word rather than sound it out. What is required is a) evidence-based curriculum and instruction (including explicit and systematic instruction in phonemic awareness and phonics), b) evidence-based screening assessments, c) evidence-based reading interventions, d) accommodations that are not used as a substitute for teaching students to read, and e) professional assessments (yet, not required for interventions or accommodations).

The Minister of Education for Ontario responded to this report by saying the government is taking immediate action to improve student literacy and making longer-term reforms to modernize the way reading is taught and assessed in schools, with a focus on phonics. Their plan includes "revising the elementary Language curriculum and the Grade 9 English course with scientific, evidence-based approaches that emphasize direct, explicit and systematic instruction, and removing references to unscientific discovery and inquiry-based learning, including the three-cueing system, by 2023."

On April 23, 2022, the Center for Research in Education and Social Policy at the University of Delaware presented the results of a study of the long-term effects of Reading Recovery. The conclusion was that the "long-term impact estimates were significant and negative". The study found that children who received Reading Recovery had scores on state reading tests in third and fourth grade that were below the test scores of similar children who did not receive Reading Recovery. It suggests three possible hypotheses for this outcome: 1) while Reading Recovery produces large impacts on early literacy measures, it does not give students the required skills for success in later grades; or, 2) the gains are lost because students do not receive sufficient intervention in later grades; or, 3) the impacts of the early intervention was washed out by subsequent experiences.

Between 2013 and 2024, 40 States have passed laws or implemented new policies related to evidence-based reading instruction.

== See also ==
- Evidence-based education
- History of writing
- Phonics
- Phonics practices by country or region
- Reading
