= Three cueing =

Reading method

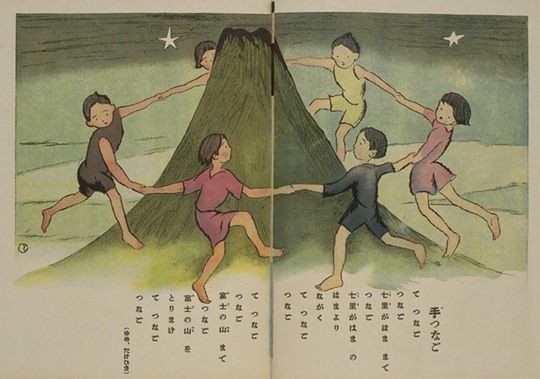
One aspect of three cueing prompts students to look at pictures to guess words

Three cueing, also known as the searchlight model or MSV (which stands for meaning, syntax, and visual information), is a controversial method of teaching young children how to read. It involves identifying unfamiliar words based on context clues, as opposed to phonics, the more traditional method of sounding out words. The method originated in the 1960s out of the work of Ken Goodman and Marie Clay, and soon saw widespread adoption in classrooms in the United States. The related theories of balanced literacy and whole language both utilize three cueing.

Questions over the effectiveness of three cueing arose even prior to its widespread adoption. The method is frequently criticized as contrary to the known science of reading and as potentially having long-term damaging effects on children's reading abilities. Critics say over-reliance on context can cause confusion between related or similarly spelled words, and that strategies taught by three cueing are reflective of those used by weak readers.

== Method ==
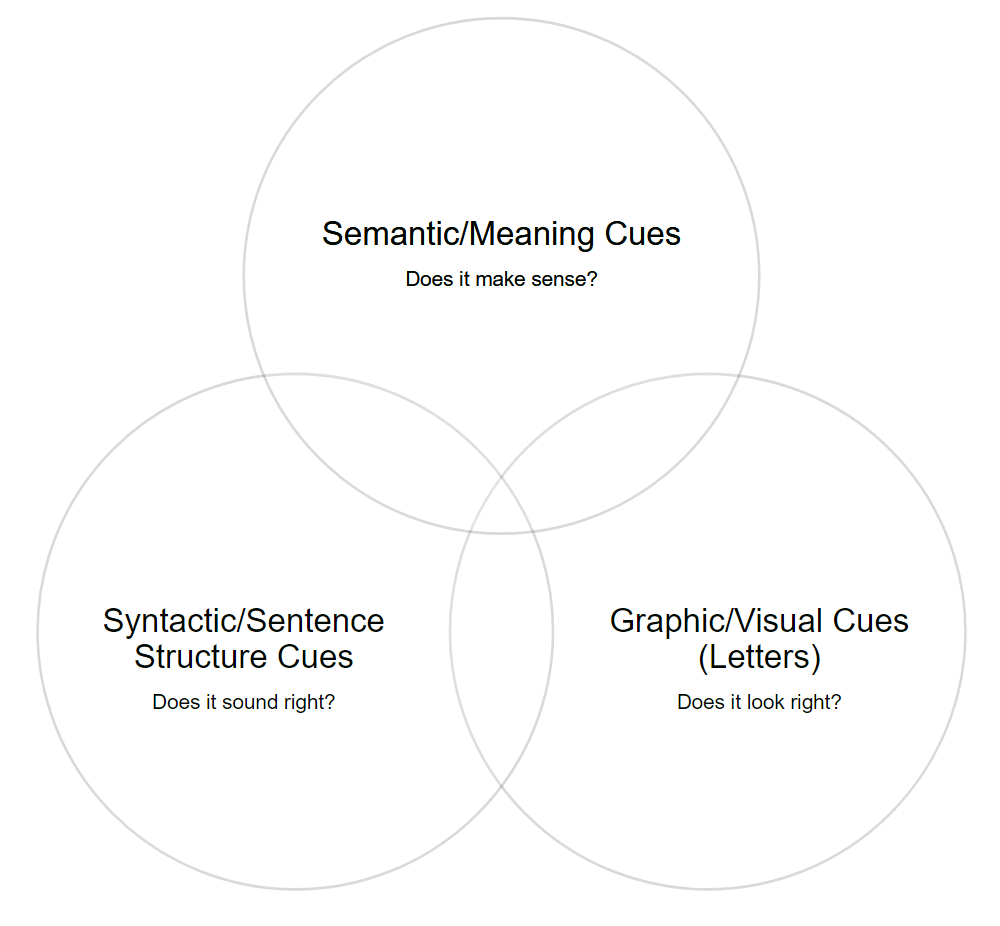
Venn diagram explaining the three cues, used by educators to explain the method

Three cueing involves identifying unfamiliar words based on context clues. In contrast to phonics, the other primary method of teaching reading, three cueing de-emphasizes the importance of using the sounds of letters (i.e., graphemes) to decode a word. The method posits that good readers gain information from three types of "cues": graphic cues, syntactic cues, and semantic cues. Graphic cues come from the letters used in the word, syntactic cues from what part of speech is appropriate for its location in the sentence, and semantic cues from what word would contextually make sense. A related idea is the MSV method, with "M" standing for the meaning of the word, "S" for sentence structure, and "V" for visual information.

Three cueing encourages teaching using visual cues, such as pictures, and sentence patterns. In one example of three cueing teaching, a teacher encourages students to use the first sound and a picture to identify a word, without looking at the entire word. The sound-spelling-meaning model and phonics-based instruction have more evidence supporting their use. Some researchers and educators have attributed part of three cueing's popularity in classrooms to its ease of teaching relative to phonics.

== History ==
The three cueing and MSV methods were developed independently during the 1960s by, respectively, Ken Goodman and Marie Clay. The theories were based on observational research from their work with children, and both Goodman and Clay came to the conclusion that letters were a less reliable method for children figuring out words than the other two types of cues. They believed that strong readers were not paying attention to the letters in the words, but rather memorizing them as discrete images. Though there were early questions about the efficacy of the reading methods encouraged by three cueing, it nonetheless became incorporated into many reading curriculums, including Clay's Reading Recovery program.

By the 1990s and early 2000s, research began to conclude that phonics was the necessary method of teaching reading to children, with an American congressional panel in 2000 concluding that the essential components of reading instruction were "vocabulary, comprehension and phonics". Programs began to re-incorporate phonics around this time, although three cueing remained a part of curriculums in the approaches of balanced literacy and whole language. As of 2020, an estimated 75% of American teachers used three cueing.

== Effectiveness ==
Three cueing methods have been criticized for misunderstanding how reading is acquired and for potentially damaging children's reading abilities over the long term. A study done in the 1970s by Keith Stanovich found the opposite of what Clay and Goodman had, concluding that using context to decode words was actually indicative of poor reading rather than strong reading. Criticism of the method says that it disrupts orthographic mapping, or the instantaneous recognition of words, which reading researchers have long understood as a benchmark of a strong reader. Balanced literacy approaches, which incorporate both phonics and three cueing, have been criticized for potentially damaging word comprehension through its use of three cueing. Predicting words is not correlated with reading proficiency and an overreliance on contextual information can cause children to confuse words with different meanings such as "pony" and "horse", or with similar spellings such as "horse" and "house".

In a 2019 interview, Goodman responded to criticisms of three cueing, saying that "word recognition is a preoccupation" and emphasizing that he places greater value on making sense of language as a whole than understanding specific words. In response to the example of children failing to distinguish between "pony" and "horse", Goodman argued that it was irrelevant whether children understood the specific word, as "pony" and "horse" are similar concepts, and a reader failing to distinguish between them would still understand the meaning of the story as a whole. He further argued against distinguishing between skilled and unskilled readers.

45 states in the U.S. have since passed bills regarding reading reform after renewed public interest and low scores in standardized testing. Over 12 states have explicitly banned educators from teaching three cueing. A lawsuit was filed by families in Massachusetts whose children had been taught three cueing; one of the plaintiffs stated that her son had difficulty reading once classroom materials transitioned into using chapter books.

The public debate between which reading method is most effective has been dubbed the "reading wars".

== See also ==
- Dysgraphia
- Dyslexia
- Early childhood education
- Extensive reading
- Functional illiteracy
- History of learning to read
- Readability
- Reading
- Reading disability
- Remedial education
- Simple view of reading
- Sold a Story
- Structured literacy
- Systematic phonics
- Why Johnny Can't Read

== Works cited ==
=== Journals ===
- Hempenstall, Kerry (2003). "The Three Cueing System: A Trojan Horse?". Australian Journal of Reading Disabilities (2). doi:10.1080/19404150309546726.

=== News ===
- Cohen, Rachel (August 15, 2023). "The new "science of reading" movement, explained". Vox.
- Davis, Dennis (2021). "Is It Time for a Hard Conversation about Cueing Systems and Word Reading in Teacher Education?". Reading and Writing Quarterly. 37 (4). doi:10.1080/10573569.2020.1792813.
- Hanford, Emily (August 22, 2019). "At a Loss for Words: How a flawed idea is teaching millions of kids to be poor readers". APM Reports.
- Hanshaw, Annelise (2025-07-13). "Missouri lawmakers ban controversial reading instruction model as primary method | Jefferson City News-Tribune". www.newstribune.com.
- Schwartz, Sarah (December 16, 2020). "Is This the End of 'Three Cueing'?". Education Week.
- Sequeira, Robbie (2025-04-30). "As reading scores fall, states turn to phonics — but not without a fight". Stateline.
- Thompson, Carolyn (December 6, 2024). "Literacy materials dropped by many schools face new pressure from struggling readers' parents". Associated Press.
