= Rudine Sims Bishop =

American professor

- Born: July 31, 1937 (age 89); Pottsville, Pennsylvania, U.S.
- Education: West Chester State Teachers College, University of Pennsylvania, Wayne State University
- Occupation: Educator
- Spouse: James J. Bishop

Rudine Sims Bishop, professor emerita at Ohio State University, has been referred to as the "mother of" multicultural children's literature for her sociologically groundbreaking American children's literature research.

== Biography ==
Bishop was born in Pottsville, Pennsylvania, about a hundred miles northwest of Philadelphia. The public schools in her community were not racially segregated, though Bishop noted that professional opportunities were limited for African Americans at the time. One area open to her was teaching.

After graduating from Pottsville Area High School, Bishop attended West Chester State Teachers College, which is now West Chester University. She completed her master's degree in education from the University of Pennsylvania. She later obtained her doctorate from Wayne State University in Detroit.

She taught elementary school for a few years. At the college and university level, Bishop taught reading, curriculum development, and children's literature at Morgan State College in Baltimore, the University of Massachusetts Amherst, the State University of New York at Buffalo and Ohio State University, where Bishop specialized in children's literature, particularly African American children's literature.

Bishop has credited a few influences on her evolving work around multicultural children's literature. The first influence came when one of her freshman college roommates, Patricia Grasty Gaines, introduced her to Marguerite de Angeli's Bright April (1946), the first children's book Bishop read with characters that looked and experienced community life similar to her own. The next memorable occasion happened while Bishop was a graduate student at Wayne State University. Here she first encountered a large collection of African American children's literature. The Detroit Free Press sponsored an annual book fair. In November 1969, Dr. Donald Bissett of Wayne State's Children's Literature Center, coordinated a display of 40+ children's books featuring African Americans at the fair. The display was called "The Darker Brother Collection" after the Langston Hughes poem, I, Too. Bishop later recalled, "...it was the first time I had seen so many children's books about African Americans together in one place. I remember wanting to read them all, see what they were like, what sorts of topics and themes were dealt with, and how African Americans were represented. That was one of the threads that eventually led to my interest in multicultural literature..." The final influence came from Bishop's work as a graduate research assistant to Wayne State professor Ken Goodman, who was also her advisor. Bishop and others assisted Goodman in his reading miscue analysis research. The analysis examines when an observed response in the reading process does not match the expected response. The research recorded children in states as diverse as Mississippi, Maine and Hawaii reading two different stories, including one identified as "culturally relevant". Bishop recalled, "...[w]hen we examined the miscues and the retellings, we observed that when there were differences between the kids' performances on the two stories, they did better on the 'culturally relevant' stories. So one conclusion is that what children read makes a difference."

Bishop's 1982 book, Shadow and Substance, established a framework for analyzing children's literature about people of color, and remains a standard in the field. Bishop examined 150 contemporary fiction books that included African American characters. She categorized the books into three distinct areas: Social Conscience, Melting Pot, and Culturally Conscious books.

== Bibliography ==
Bishop has written a number of books and articles related to American and multicultural children's literature including:

Author	Title	Year	Publisher	ISBN	Notes
Sims, Rudine	A psycholinguistic description of miscues generated by selected young readers during the oral reading of text material in Black dialect and standard English	1972	Ed.D. Wayne State University		OCLC Number: 9291163
Sims, Rudine	Shadow and substance: Afro-American experience in contemporary children's fiction	1982	National Council of Teachers of English: Urbana, IL	9780814143766	Survey of books by and about African Americans published between 1965 and 1979
Sims, Rudine	Strong Black Girls: A Ten Year Old Responds to Fiction about Afro-Americans (article)	1983	Journal of Research and Development in Education		vol. 16, no. 3 pp. 21–28, Spring 1983
Bishop, Rudine Sims	Mirrors, Windows, and Sliding Glass Doors (article)	1990	Perspectives: Choosing and Using Books for the Classroom		vol. 6, no. 3, Summer issue
Bishop, Rudine Sims	Presenting Walter Dean Myers	1990	Twayne Publishers: Boston, MA	9780805782141	
Bishop, Rudine Sims	Kaleidoscope: a multicultural booklist for grades K-8: second edition, covering books published from 1993 to 1995	1997	National Council of Teachers of English: Urbana, IL	9780814125434	
Compiled by Rudine Sims Bishop, Illustrations by Lois Mailou Jones	Wonders: the best children's poems of Effie Lee Newsome	1999	Wordsong/Boyds Mills Press: Honesdale, PA	9781563978258	
Bishop, Rudine Sims	Free within ourselves: the development of African American children's literature	2007	Greenwood Press: Westport, CT	9780313340932	
Bishop, Rudine Sims	Bishop Daniel A. Payne: great black leader	2009	Just Us Books: East Orange, NJ	9781933491158	

== Other contributions ==
Bishop has been involved with the Coretta Scott King Book Awards program for several years. In 2014 and 2015, she was a jury member. In 2016 and 2017, Bishop chaired the jury committee.

Bishop was a member of the 1999 Caldecott Medal Selection Committee as well as a member of 1992 Newbery Medal Selection Committee.

Bishop was also one of three members on the Boston Globe Horn Book Award Committee for 1987-1988 and 2003–2004.

== Awards ==
In 2013, Rudine Sims Bishop received the National Council of Teachers of English (NCTE) James R. Squire award. The award is given to an NCTE member who has contributed foundational knowledge within the field of education.

In 2017, Bishop received the Coretta Scott King–Virginia Hamilton Award for Lifetime Achievement award.

Bishop was inducted into the Reading Hall of Fame in 2001.

== Students ==
Former students of Bishop include:

- Dr. Jonda C. McNair, the Charlotte S. Huck Endowed Professor of Children's Literature at The Ohio State University.
- Dr. Cynthia Tyson, Professor in the Department of Teaching and Learning at The Ohio State University.
