= Alphabetic code =

Alphabetic code may refer to:

- Alphabetic code – as used in education;
- Alphabetic principle – the basis for alphabetic writing systems;
- Huffman coding using letters as symbols;
- ISO 4217 – codes for currency and funds units;
- Country code – any of several systems codes to represent countries and other geographic areas;
- ISO 3166-1 – a specific set of codes for different countries
- Federal Reserve Bank#Banks – codes for the different districts in the US Federal Reserve banking system
