= Diane McGuinness =

American psychologist (1933–2022)

Diane McGuinness (February 20, 1933 – May 13, 2022) was an American cognitive psychologist who wrote extensively on sex differences, education, learning disabilities, and early reading instruction.

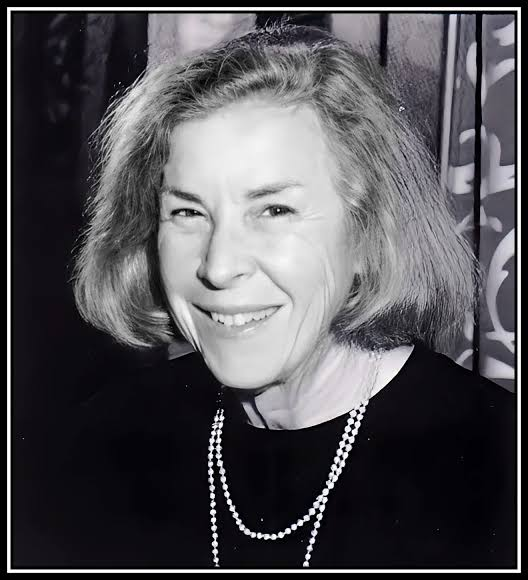

McGuinness was born in 1933, in Pasadena, California. She attended Occidental College and received a B.A. in 1954. In the late 1960s she worked as a secondary school music teacher in the U.K. In the early seventies she received a Bachelor of Science at Birkbeck College (with first class honours, 1971), and a PhD in cognitive psychology at University College London in 1974.

Over the course of a long academic career, she taught at many institutions, including UC Santa Cruz, Stanford University, and the University of South Florida. Prior to her death in May of 2022, she was Emeritus Professor of Psychology at the University of South Florida.

McGuinness published over 100 papers, chapters, and books on a number of subjects in the field of psychology.

McGuinness was an outspoken critic of whole language instruction but also of phonics as it is traditionally taught in the United States. She was not opposed to an approach to early reading instruction known as synthetic phonics or linguistic phonics, in which the starting point for instruction is the 40 or so phonemes of English. In synthetic phonics instruction, each sound (or phoneme) is introduced initially with a single "basic code" spelling, which is usually the most common spelling for that sound. For example, the /f/ sound might be introduced with the 'f' spelling (or grapheme). Additional "spelling alternatives" for this sound -- e.g., 'ff' as in stuff, 'ph' as in graph, 'gh' as in rough -- will generally be introduced later. In synthetic phonics, students are taught to read by blending all of the sounds in the word, and the focus is on single sounds, not onsets and rimes or other multi-sound units. Whole-word recognition and "sight word" instruction are generally discouraged, as are multi-cueing strategies and contextual guessing. Students are encouraged to read by blending sounds and to spell with their basic-code spellings while they are learning spelling alternatives. Generally, a heavy emphasis is placed on showing the students mostly words they can read with their current code knowledge -- that is, using materials that are "decodable" in relation to what has been taught previously. This is the currently mandated approach in England, however 27% of children still cannot read by age 11.

McGuinness's book Why Our Children Can't Read contains a comprehensive analysis of the English writing system, its sounds and spellings. This has been useful for synthetic phonics instructors teaching English vowel sounds, because many English vowels can be spelled several different ways. For example, the /ee/ sound can be spelled 'ee' as in see, 'ea' as in sea, 'y' as in funny, 'e' as in me, 'ie' as in cookie, 'i' as in ski, 'ey' as in key, etc. McGuinness popularized the term "spelling alternatives" to describe the various ways of writing a sound. She also introduced the term "code overlap" to describe a spelling (or grapheme) that can stand for more than one sound (or phoneme). For example, the spelling 'ow' can stand for the /ou/ sound as in the word now, or for the /oe/ sound as in the word snow.

McGuinness's views on reading instruction have been influential (but also controversial) in the UK and cited by the Reading Reform Foundation of the UK (https://rrf.org.uk/) who have been a major proponent of synthetic phonics and the ideas of McGuinness.

In the United States, synthetic phonics is not nearly as well known. Phono-Graphix was developed by McGuinness's daughter-in-law, Carmen McGuinness and has been used for many years in schools and clinics. Carmen McGuiness is vehemently opposed to synthetic phonics as seen in a Special Report: Phono-Graphix and Synthetic Phonics (https://www.phonographixcourses.com/SPECIAreportFINAL.pdf) and has written about her program being plagiarised by Sounds Write.

McGuinness stirred up controversy with her views on dyslexia and teaching letter names. She argued that dyslexia is not a biological condition but a socially created problem that results from a complex spelling code combined with ineffective teaching methods. She argued against teaching the letter names in the early phases of reading instruction on the grounds that letter names can confuse students. What is really important, McGuinness maintained, is that students be taught the sound values and the relationships that obtain between sounds and letters.

McGuinness died on May 13, 2022, at the age of 89.

== Written works ==
- When Children Don't Learn, Basic Books (New York City), 1985.
- (Editor) Dominance, Aggression, and War, Paragon House Publishers (New York City), 1987.
- Evolution: The Transdisciplinary Paradigm, ICUS Books, 1987.
- Why Our Children Can't Read, and What We Can Do about It, Free Press (New York City), 1997. (This is McGuinness's most influential book.)
- My First Phonics Book, Dorling Kindersley (New York City), 1999.
- Growing a Reader from Birth: Your Child's Path from Language to Literacy, W.W. Norton and Co. (New York, NY), 2004.
- Early Reading Instruction: What Science Really Tells Us about How to Teach Reading, MIT Press (Cambridge, MA), 2004.
- Language Development and Learning to Read: The Scientific Study of How Language Development Affects Reading Skill, MIT Press (Cambridge, MA), 2005.
- Sound Steps to Reading: Parent/Teacher Handbook (Foolproof, Scripted Lessons for Reading and Spelling), Trafford Publishing, 2008.
- Sound Steps to Reading: Sound-Targeting Storybook, Trafford Publishing, 2008.
