= Decodable text =

Type of text often used in beginning reading instruction

Decodable text is a type of text often used in beginning reading instruction. Decodable texts are carefully sequenced to progressively incorporate words that are consistent with the letters and corresponding phonemes that have been taught to the new reader. Therefore, with this type of text new readers can decipher words using the phonics skills they have been taught. For instance, children could decode a phrase such as “Pat the fat rat” if they had been taught the letter-sound associations for each letter—that 'p' stands for the sound /p/, 'a' for the sound /a/, etc.

Generally, decodable text is used in programs that have a strong phonics emphasis. Whole-language and whole word methods of instruction generally use stories with familiar high-frequency words arranged in predictable and repetitive patterns. Whole-language texts have received increasing criticism for encouraging word guessing strategies instead of skilled reading. The texts do not stand alone in a reading classroom, and the type of text used influences how text is encountered and likely the instructional approach.

Both decodable texts and whole language readers typically have levels to provide an indication of their reading difficulty. In decodable texts, levels introduce new sounds and letters, and progressively multisyllable words and more complex sentences. Decodable texts vary in quality in terms of the sequence in which sounds are introduced, the rigor of the controlled language, the richness of stories under severe sound limitations, the appearance (font sizes, illustrations, paper weight to avoid bleeding which can be very distracting to the readers, etc.), length in pages and the pace of progression.

In the United States, certain states dictate that a very high percentage of the words in the earliest texts be decodable according to letter–sound correspondences that children have been taught. Advocates argue that this kind of text enables students to practice the phonics skills they have been taught. Critics argue that this kind of text is stilted and unnatural. In California, using the Whole Language approach was blamed for the drop in student reading scores and the California legislature mandated a renewed emphasis on decodable texts. While not introducing a similar decodable mandate, the United Kingdom similarly shifted to a phonics focus with universal phonics screening at the end of year 1 in 2012, and saw the proportion of students meeting the grade level standard rise from 58% to 74% by 2014.

== Example series ==
There are a wide variety of phonics and decodable reader series available. Examples include BOB Books, Reading Elephant Phonics Books, Dog on a Log Books, FlyLeaf Emergent Readers, Learning at the Primary Pond Decodable Readers, and Practice Readers Books. Some series are also specifically targeted towards teenage and adult learners, including Saddleback TERL Phonics Book Sets.

== See also ==
- Learning to read
- Phonics
- Reading education
- Synthetic phonics
- Whole language
