= Whole language =

Approach to teaching children to read

Whole language is a discredited philosophy of reading and an educational method originally developed for teaching literacy in English to young children. The method became a major model for education in the United States, Canada, New Zealand, and the United Kingdom in the 1980s and 1990s, despite there being no scientific support for the method's effectiveness. (Note: Sources:) It is based on the premise that learning to read English comes naturally to humans, especially young children, in the same way that learning to speak develops naturally. However, researchers such as Reid Lyon say that "reading is not a natural process", and many students, when learning to read, require direct instruction in alphabetic coding, phonemic awareness, phonics, spelling, and comprehension.

Whole language approaches to reading instruction are typically contrasted with the far more effective phonics-based methods of teaching reading and writing. Phonics-based methods emphasize instruction for decoding and spelling. Whole language practitioners disagree with that view, instead focusing on teaching meaning and making students read more. The scientific consensus is that whole language-based methods of reading instruction (e.g., teaching children to use context cues to guess the meaning of a printed word) are not as effective as phonics-based approaches. (Note: Sources:) Rejection of whole language (and its offshoot, balanced literacy) was a key component in the Mississippi Miracle of increased academic performance across the Southern United States in the 2010s and 2020s.

== Overview ==
Whole language is an educational philosophy that is complex to describe, particularly because it runs counter to research fields including education, linguistics, psychology, sociology, and anthropology (see also Language Experience Approach). It can be viewed as being founded on the educational philosophy of John Amos Comenius in the early 17th century. Yetta Goodman has also cited the contributions of John Dewey, Lev Vygotsky, Louise Rosenblatt, and Ashton Warner, among other writers, in the development of the whole language movement. One description of whole language is "a concept that embodies both a philosophy of language development as well as the instructional approaches embedded within, and supportive of that philosophy".

Several strands run through descriptions of whole language. These include:

- focus on making meaning in reading and expressing meaning in writing;
- constructivist approaches to knowledge creation, emphasizing students' interpretations of texts and free expression of ideas in writing (often through daily journal entries);
- emphasis on high-quality and culturally diverse literature;
- integrating literacy into other areas of the curriculum, especially math, science, and social studies;
- frequent reading;
  - with students in small guided reading groups
  - to students with read-alouds
  - by students independently;
- reading and writing for real purposes;
- focus on motivational aspects of literacy, emphasizing the love of books and engaging reading materials;
- meaning-centered whole– to part-to-whole instruction where phonics are taught contextually in embedded phonics (different from synthetic phonics or analytical phonics); and
- emphasis on using and understanding the meaning-making role of phonics, grammar, spelling, capitalization, and punctuation in diverse social contexts.

Attempts to empirically verify the benefits of whole language have repeatedly resulted in evidence that whole language is less effective than phonics-based reading instruction. Research psychologist Keith Stanovich has asserted, "The idea that learning to read is just like learning to speak is accepted by no responsible linguist, psychologist, or cognitive scientist in the research community." In a systematic review of the reading research literature, Louisa Moats concluded that "Almost every premise advanced by whole language about how reading is learned has been contradicted by scientific investigations". Harvard professor Jeanne Chall surveyed the research on literacy and conducted her own classroom observations and found that the "code-emphasis method" (phonics) produces substantially better readers, not only in the mechanical aspects of reading but also in terms of reading for meaning and reading for enjoyment, contrary to the claims of whole-language theorists.

== Underlying premises ==
=== Cognitive skills of reading ===
Sub-lexical reading

Sub-lexical reading involves teaching reading by associating characters or groups of characters with sounds or by using phonics learning and teaching methodology.

Lexical reading

Lexical reading involves acquiring words or phrases without attention to the characters or groups of characters that compose them or by using whole language learning and teaching methodology.

=== Learning theory ===
According to researchers Jack C. Richards and Theodore S. Rogers, the idea of whole language has its basis in holism, the belief that a system should be viewed as a whole and not merely as a collection of parts.

== Ken Goodman's linguistic hypothesis ==
In 1967, Ken Goodman set out to show that the views of Noam Chomsky, with regard to human speech, could be applied to serve as psychological models of the reading process. He chided educators for attempting to apply what he saw as unnecessary orthographic order to a process that relied on holistic examination of words. Whether or not Goodman was indeed inspired by Chomsky, neither Chomsky himself nor his followers have ever accepted Goodman's views, as learning to speak is very different from learning to read.

=== Goodman's four proposed cueing systems ===
Goodman proposed, though he did not show through research, that there are four "cueing systems" that readers have to guess to determine what word comes next:

1. graphophonemic: the shapes of the letters and the sounds that they evoke (see phonetics);
2. semantic: what word one would expect to occur based on the meaning of the sentence so far;
3. syntactic: what part of speech or word would make sense based on the grammar of the language; and
4. pragmatic: what the function of the text is.

The "graph" part of the word "graphophonemic" means the shape or symbol of the graphic input, i.e., the text. According to Goodman, these systems work together to help readers guess the right word. He emphasized that pronouncing individual words will involve the use of all three systems (letter clues, meaning clues from context, and syntactical structure of the sentence).

The graphophonemic cues are related to the sounds we hear (the phonological system including individual letters and letter combinations), the letters of the alphabet, and the conventions of spelling, punctuation, and print. Students who are emerging readers use these cues considerably. However, in the English language, there is not a perfectly precise relationship between written symbols and sound symbols. Sometimes the relationships and their patterns do not work, as in the example of great and head.

Theories about how children learn to pronounce these words is part and parcel of the reading wars. Goodman suggested, but did not prove experimentally, that proficient readers and writers draw on their prior experiences with text and the other cueing systems as well as the phonological system, as their reading and writing develops. He wrote that "The cue systems are used simultaneously and interdependently. What constitutes useful graphic information depends on how much syntactic and semantic information is available. Within high contextual constraints, an initial consonant may be all that is needed to identify an element and make possible the prediction of an ensuing sequence or the confirmation of prior predictions." He continued with "Reading requires not so much skills as strategies that make it possible to select the most productive cues." He believed that reading involves the interrelationship of all the language systems, that is, that readers sample and make judgments about which cues from each system will provide the most useful information in making predictions that will get them to meaning. Goodman provides a partial list of the various systems readers use as they interact with text. Within the grapho-phonemic system, there are:

- Letter–sound relationships
- Shape (or word configuration)
- Known 'little words' in bigger words
- Whole known words
- Recurrent spelling patterns

The semantic cuing system is the one in which meaning is constructed. "So focused is reading on making sense that the visual input, the perceptions we form, and the syntactic patterns we assign are all directed by our meaning construction." The key component of the semantic system is context. A reader must be able to attach meaning to words and have some prior knowledge to use as a context for understanding the word. They must be able to relate the newly learned word to prior knowledge through personal associations with text and the structure of text.

The semantic system is developed from the beginning through early interactions with adults. At first, this usually involves labeling (e.g., "This is a dog"). Then labeling becomes more detailed (e.g., "It is a Labrador dog. Its coat is black.") The child learns that there is a set of "dog attributes" and that within the category "dog", there are subsets of "dog" (e.g., long-hair, short-hair). The development of this system and the development of the important concepts that relate to the system are largely accomplished as children begin to explore language independently. As children speak about what they've done and play out their experiences, they are making personal associations between their experiences and language. This is critical to success in later literacy practices, such as reading comprehension and writing. The meaning people bring to the reading is available to them through every cuing system, but it's particularly influential as we move from our sense of the syntactic patterns to the semantic structures.

The syntactic system, according to Goodman and Watson, includes the interrelation of words and sentences within connected text. In the English language, syntactic relations include word order, tense, number, and gender. The syntactic system is also concerned with word parts that change the meaning of a word, called morphemes. For example, adding the suffix "less" or adding "s" to the end of a word changes its meaning or tense. As speakers of English, people know where to place subjects, which pronoun to use, and where adjectives occur. Individual word meaning is determined by the place of the word in the sentence and the particular semantic or syntactic role it occupies. For example:

The mayor was present when he received a beautiful present from the present members of the board.

The syntactic system is usually in place when native English-speaking children begin school. Immersed in language, children begin to recognize that phrases and sentences are usually ordered in certain ways. This notion of ordering is the development of syntax. Like all the cuing systems, Goodman suggested that the semantic system provides the possibility of correct prediction when trying to make sense or meaning of written language. Goodman categorized the cues found in the flow of language as:

- Patterns of words (or function order)
- Inflection and inflectional agreement
- Function words such as noun markers (the, a, that)
- Intonation (which is poorly represented in writing by punctuation)

The pragmatic system is another system proposed by Goodman involved in the construction of meaning while reading. This brings into play the socio-cultural knowledge of the reader. It provides information about the purposes and needs the reader has while reading. Yetta Goodman and Dorothy Watson state that, "Language has different meaning depending on the reason for use, the circumstances in which the language is used, and the ideas writers and readers have about the contextual relations with the language users. Language cannot exist outside a sociocultural context, which includes the prior knowledge of the language user. For example, shopping lists, menus, reports and plays are arranged uniquely and are dependent on the message, the intent, the audience, and the context."

By the time children begin school, they may have developed an inferred understanding of some of the pragmatics of a particular situation. For example, turn-taking in conversation, reading poetry, or a shopping list. "While different materials may share common semantic, syntactic, and graphophonic features, each genre has its own organization and each requires certain experiences by the reader."

Goodman performed a methodologically flawed study, where children first read words individually and then read the same words in connected text. He found that the children did better the second time, when they read the words in connected text. Later replications of the experiment failed to find effects, however, when children did not read the same words in connected text immediately after reading them individually, as they had in Goodman's experiment.

Goodman's theory has been criticized by researchers who favor a phonics-based approach and have presented research that supports their views. Critics argue that good readers use decoding as their primary approach to reading and context to confirm that what they have read makes sense.

=== Application of Goodman's theory ===
Goodman's argument was compelling to some educators as a way of thinking about beginning reading and literacy more broadly. This led to the idea that reading and writing were concepts that should be considered as wholes, learned by experience and exposure more than analysis and didactic instruction. This largely accounts for the focus on time spent reading, especially independent reading. Even today, many classrooms (whole-language or otherwise) include silent reading time, sometimes called DEAR ("Drop Everything And Read") time or SSR (sustained silent reading). Some versions of this independent reading time include a structured role for the teacher, especially Reader's Workshop. Despite the popularity of the extension of Chomsky's linguistic ideas to literacy, it is based on a misunderstanding of those theories as, unlike language, literacy is not a human universal but a human invention (much as children learn to walk without being taught, but not how to drive a car or fly a helicopter). All experimental research shows that reading, unlike language in the Chomskyan view, is not a pre-programmed human skill; it must be learned. Sally Shaywitz, a neurologist at Yale University, is credited with much of the research on the neurological structures of reading.

=== Contrasts with phonics ===
Because of this holistic emphasis, whole language is contrasted with skill-based areas of instruction, especially phonics and synthetic phonics. Phonics instruction is a commonly used technique for teaching students to read. It tends to emphasize attention to the individual components of words, for example, the sounds (phonemes) /k/, /æ/, and /t/ are represented by the letters (graphemes) c, a, and t. Because whole language proponents do not focus exclusively on the individual parts, tending to focus on the relationship of parts to and within the larger context, they do not favor some types of phonics instruction. Whole language advocates state that they do teach and believe in phonics, especially a type of phonics known as embedded phonics. In embedded phonics, letters are taught during other lessons focused on meaning and the phonics component is considered a "mini lesson". Instruction in embedded phonics typically emphasizes the consonants and the short vowels, as well as letter combinations called rimes or phonograms. The use of this embedded phonics model is called a "whole-part-whole" approach because, consistent with holistic thinking, students read the text for meaning first (whole), then examine features of the phonics system (part), and finally use their new knowledge while reading the text again (whole).

This mixed approach is a development from the practice employed in the 1970s and 1980s, when virtually no phonics was included in the curriculum at all. Theorists such as Ken Goodman and Frank Smith at that time advocated a "guessing game" approach, entirely based on context and whole-word analysis. It is worth noting that neuroscientist Mark Seidenberg, one of the many critics of whole language and Balance Literacy, writes that Ken Goodman's "guessing game theory" had no supporting evidence and "was grievously wrong". In addition, in his 2009 book, Reading in the brain, cognitive neuroscientist Stanislas Dehaene said, "cognitive psychology directly refutes any notion of teaching via a 'global' or 'whole language' method." He goes on to talk about "the myth of whole-word reading", saying it has been refuted by recent experiments. "We do not recognize a printed word through a holistic grasping of its contours, because our brain breaks it down into letters and graphemes."

Most whole language advocates now see that children go through stages of spelling development as they develop, use, and gain control over written language. Early literacy research conducted by Piagetian researcher Emilia Ferreiro, published in her book Literacy Before Schooling, has been replicated by University of Alabama professor Maryann Manning. Based on this research, "invented spelling" is another "whole-part-whole" approach: children learn to read by writing in a meaningful context, e.g., by writing letters to others. To write a word, they have to decompose its spoken form into sounds and then translate them into letters, e.g., k, a, t for the phonemes /k/, /æ/, and /t/. Empirical studies show that later spelling development is fostered rather than hindered by these invented spellings—as long as children from the beginning are confronted with "book spellings", too.

=== Rise of whole language and reaction ===
After its introduction by Goodman, whole language rose in popularity dramatically. It became a major educational paradigm of the late 1980s and the 1990s. Despite its popularity during this period, educators who believed that skill instruction was important for students' learning, and some researchers in education, were skeptical of whole-language claims. What followed were the "Reading Wars" of the 1980s and 1990s between advocates of phonics and those of whole-language methodology, which in turn led to several attempts to catalog research on the efficacy of phonics and whole language.

New Zealand education researcher Marie Clay created the Reading Recovery program in 1976 based on Goodman's ideas. After lengthy observations of early readers, Clay defined reading as a message-getting, problem-solving activity, and writing as a message-sending, problem-solving activity. Clay suggested that both activities involved linking invisible patterns of oral language with visible symbols.

The US Congress commissioned reading expert Marilyn Jager Adams to write a definitive book on the topic. She determined that phonics was important but suggested that some elements of the whole language approach were helpful. Two large-scale efforts, in 1998 by the United States National Research Council's Commission on Preventing Reading Difficulties in Young Children and in 2000 by the United States National Reading Panel, catalogued the most important elements of a reading program. While proponents of whole language find the latter to be controversial, both panels found that phonics instruction of varying kinds, especially analytic and synthetic phonics, contributed positively to students' ability to read words on tests of reading words in isolation. Both panels also found that embedded phonics and no phonics contributed to lower rates of achievement for most populations of students when measured on tests of reading words in isolation. The panel recommended an approach it described as "scientifically based reading research" (SBRR), which cited five elements essential to effective reading instruction: explicit Systematic Phonics instruction, phonological awareness, reading comprehension, vocabulary, and fluency.

Stephen Krashen criticized the evidence presented in the National Reading Panel's Report in 2004 as well as clarifying the role of reading in acquiring phonics and the use of explicit phonics instruction at the beginner level in whole language.

In December 2005, the Australian government endorsed the teaching of synthetic phonics and discredited the whole language approach ("on its own"). Its Department of Education, Science and Training published a National Inquiry into the Teaching of Literacy. The report states: "The evidence is clear, whether from research, good practice observed in schools, advice from submissions to the Inquiry, consultations, or from Committee members' own individual experiences, that direct systematic instruction in phonics during the early years of schooling is an essential foundation for teaching children to read." See Synthetic phonics § Acceptance in Australia.

In 2006, the U.K. Department for Education and Skills undertook a review of early reading that came out in favor of Synthetic phonics. Subsequently, in March 2011, the U.K. Department of Education released a white paper entitled "The Importance of Teaching", which supported systematic synthetic phonics as the best method for teaching reading.

On 23 April 2022, the Center for Research in Education and Social Policy at the University of Delaware presented the results of a study of Marie Clay's Reading Recovery long-term effects, finding that the "long-term impact estimates were significant and negative".

=== State of the debate ===
Despite clear data showing the ineffectiveness of whole reading, many whole language advocates continue to argue that their approach, including embedded phonics, has been shown to improve student achievement. Whole language advocates sometimes criticize advocates of skill instruction as reductionist and describe the use of phonics as "word calling", because it does not involve the use of meaning. The United States National Reading Panel is criticized especially harshly by some in the whole-language community for failing to include qualitative research designs that show benefits for embedded phonics (the panel only considered experiments and quasi-experiments). On the other hand, some parents and teachers have objected to the de-emphasis of phonics in whole language-based curricula (such as Reading Recovery) and have advocated for the removal of whole language from schools.

In 1996, the California Department of Education led the way in returning to the teaching of phonics. By 2014, the department had clear guidelines for teaching children in phonemic awareness, phonics, and segmenting and blending. The New York Public School System followed, and by 2015 had abandoned whole language, Embedded Phonics, and Balanced Literacy in favor of systematic phonics.

Neuroscientists have also weighed into the debate, some of them demonstrating that the whole-word method is much slower and uses the wrong brain area for reading. One neuroscientist, Mark Seidenberg, says "Goodman's guessing game theory was grievously wrong" and "the impact was enormous and continues to be felt". When it come to evidence supporting the whole-language theory, he emphatically states "There wasn't any". He is also especially critical of Smith's book, Reading Without Nonsense, which suggests the following recommendation to help a struggling reader: "The first alternative and preference is to skip over the puzzling word. The second alternative is to guess what the unknown word might be. And the final and least preferred alternative is to sound the word out. Phonics, in other words, comes last." Seidenberg goes on to say that, although reading science has rejected the theories behind whole language, in education they are "theoretical zombies". Cognitive neuroscientist Stanislas Dehaene has said, "cognitive psychology directly refutes any notion of teaching via a 'global' or 'whole-language' method." He goes on to talk about "the myth of whole-word reading" (also: sight words), saying it has been refuted by recent experiments. "We do not recognize a printed word through a holistic grasping of its contours, because our brain breaks it down into letters and graphemes."

==== One district's experience: Bethlehem, PA ====
In 2015, Jack Silva, the chief academic officer for Bethlehem, Pennsylvania, discovered that a lot of students in his district were struggling with reading. In 2015, only 56 percent of third-graders were scoring proficient on the state reading test. Silva conducted a survey of reading instruction methods that were being used. The predominant approach, he learned, involved the use of methods based upon a whole-language philosophy. In response, the Bethlehem district invested approximately $3 million on training, materials, and support to help its early elementary teachers and principals learn the science of how reading works and how children should be taught, focusing on phonics instruction. At the end of the 2018 school year, after the phonics-based re-training, 84 percent of kindergartners met or exceeded the benchmark score.

==== Adoption of some whole-language concepts ====
While rancor continues, much of whole language's emphasis on quality literature, cultural diversity, and reading in groups and to students is widely supported by the educational community due to its benefits of increased comprehension. The importance of motivation, long a central focus of whole-language approaches, has gained more attention in the broader educational community in the last few years. Prominent critic of whole language Louisa Cook Moats has argued, however, that just because whole language focuses on quality literature, diversity, reading groups, and motivation, these are not at all exclusive to whole language and can be easily integrated into any teaching approach. She and others contend that these components of instruction are supported by educators of diverse educational perspectives. As one report states, "Reading materials must be carefully chosen so as to be at the right reading level. Phonics instruction cannot stand alone". Moats contends that the principles essential to whole language, and those that render it ineffective and unfit for reading education are: a) children learn to read from exposure to print, b) hostility to drilling in phonics and other forms of direct instruction, and c) the tendency to endorse the use of context-clues and guesswork to decipher a word rather than phonemic decoding.

==== Balanced literacy ====
Since 1996, "balanced literacy" has been suggested as an integrative approach, portrayed by its advocates as taking the best elements of both whole language and code-emphasizing phonics, something promoted by Adams in 1990. In 1996, the California Department of Education described the balanced approach as "one which combines the language and literature-rich activities associated with whole language with explicit teaching of the skills needed to decode words—for all children." In 1997, the department called for grade-one teaching of concepts about print, phonemic awareness, decoding, and word recognition, as well as vocabulary and concept development. In 2014, the department stated, "Ensuring that children know how to decode regularly spelled one-syllable words by mid-first grade is crucial". It went on to say that "Learners need to be phonemically aware (especially able to segment and blend phonemes)". In grades two and three, children receive explicit instruction in advanced phonic-analysis and reading multi-syllabic and more complex words.

The New York Public School system adopted balanced literacy as its literacy curriculum in 2003. However, in 2015, it began a process of revising its English Language Arts Learning Standards, calling for teaching involving "reading or literacy experiences" as well as phonemic awareness from pre-kindergarten to grade 1, and phonics and word recognition from grade 1 to grade 4.

Other states, such as Ohio, Colorado, Minnesota, Mississippi, and Arkansas are continuing to emphasize the need for instruction in evidenced-based phonics.

Critics of balanced literacy have suggested that the term is a disingenuous recasting of whole language with obfuscating new terminology. Neuroscientist Mark Seidenberg, a proponent of the science of reading and the teaching of phonics, writes that, "Balanced literacy allowed educators to declare an end to the increasingly troublesome 'wars' without resolving the underlying issues", and that "Balanced literacy provided little guidance for teachers who thought that phonics was a cause of poor reading and did not know how to teach it".

No Child Left Behind has brought a resurgence of interest in phonics. Its "Reading First" program addresses the reading deficiency in elementary students and requires that students must be explicitly and systematically taught five skills: phonemic awareness, phonics, vocabulary, comprehension, and fluency. During the 2000s, whole language receded to marginal status, and continues to fade.

== Proponents and critics ==
Prominent proponents of whole language include Ken Goodman, Frank Smith, Carolyn Burke, Jerome Harste, Yetta Goodman, Dorothy Watson, and Stephen Krashen.

Widely known whole-language critics include Rudolf Flesch, Louisa Cook Moats, G. Reid Lyon, James M. Kauffman, Phillip Gough (co-creator of the Simple view of reading), Keith Stanovich, Diane McGuinness, Steven Pinker, David C. Geary, Douglas Carnine, Edward Kame'enui, Jerry Silbert, Lynn Melby Gordon, Diane Ravitch, Jeanne Chall, Emily Hanford, Jordan Peterson, Mark Seidenberg, and Stanislas Dehaene.

== See also ==
- Decodable text, phonics issue
- Dick and Jane, popular reader in mid-20th century
- Direct instruction, a synthetic phonics method
- Learning to read
- Lucy Calkins
- Mississippi Miracle
- Phonics
- Reading education
- Reading for special needs
- Sold a Story, a podcast about whole language
- Three cueing
- Writing process
