= Dave Kansas =

American newspaper editor

David Kansas (born March 28, 1967) was the president of American Public Media until a restructuring in March 2022. He had also served as chief operating officer of American Public Media Group, a position he assumed in 2011. He was formerly an editor with The Wall Street Journal and TheStreet.com.

== Career ==
Prior to taking the COO role at American Public Media Group, Kansas was a journalist living in London and working for The Wall Street Journal. While working for The Wall Street Journal, Kansas has written about a number of topics such as European financial systems and the stock market. He was the editor of The Wall Street Journal's Money & Investing section, author of the books The Wall Street Journal Guide to the End of Wall Street as We Know It and The Wall Street Journal's Complete Money & Investing Guidebook.

Kansas is also former president of a personal finance online venture FiLife.com between Dow Jones and IAC/InterActiveCorp. Prior to that, he also served as editor-in-chief of TheStreet.com during its formative years, working for site founder Jim Cramer and served on the board of directors.

In 2016, Kansas was named Director of Johnson Center for Journalism and Communication at Bethel University.

== Personal life ==
Kansas attended St. Paul Academy from kindergarten to grade 12. During his time there, he participated in football, basketball, and baseball. Every spring the school would have a musical, which he also participated in. He served as the treasurer of the Student Activities Committee and was also a member of the state tournament winning Quiz Bowl for both his junior and senior year. He spent a year at Macalester College and then obtained his undergraduate degree in 1990 from Columbia College of Columbia University.
