= Madeleine Baran =

American investigative journalist

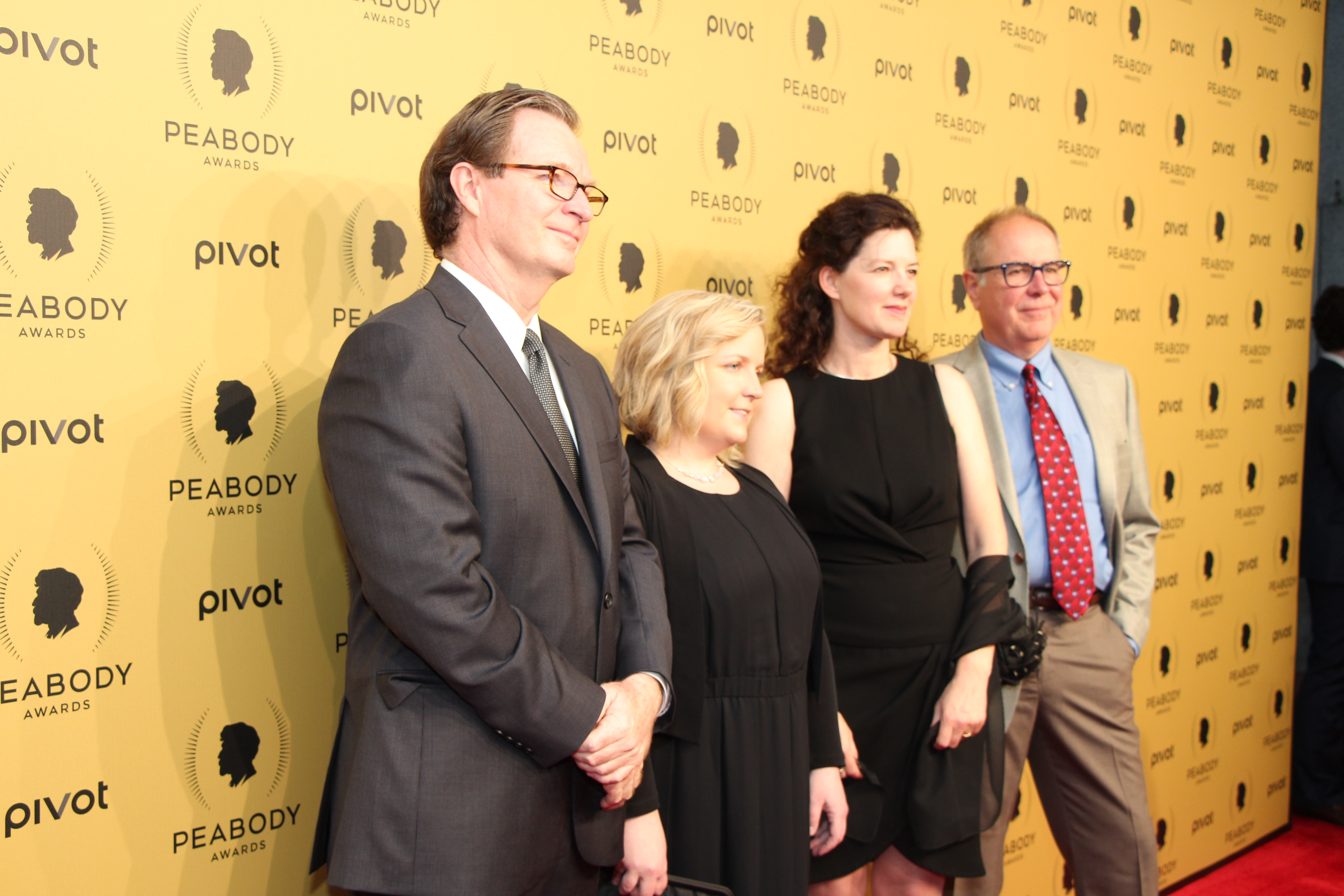
Chris Worthington, Madeleine Baran, Sasha Aslanian, and Mike Edgerly from MPR News on the red carpet before accepting the 2014 Peabody Award for Betrayed by Silence.

Madeleine Baran is an American investigative journalist. She is best known as the lead reporter for the APM podcast In the Dark. She has received accolades including three Peabody Awards, a Gracie Award and two Sigma Delta Chi Awards for her reporting.

== Life and career ==
Baran is from Milwaukee. She studied at Hampshire College and New York University, where she received a master's degree in journalism and French studies.

Baran worked at Minnesota Public Radio (MPR) for six-and-half years. In 2013 and 2014, she led MPR's coverage of the Archdiocese of St. Paul and Minneapolis' sex abuse scandals in a radio documentary Betrayed by Silence. Her reporting led to the resignation of the archbishop, criminal charges against the archdiocese, and lawsuits by victims of clergy sex abuse. She received a Peabody Award and a 2014 Gracie Award for Outstanding Investigative Program or Feature for the coverage.

Baran is the host and lead reporter of the podcast In the Dark, which was first produced by American Public Media. It was named one of "The Best New Podcasts of 2016" by The New York Times. In 2020, season 2 of In the Dark won the Radio Silver Gavel Award from the American Bar Association and Baran received the Alfred I. duPont–Columbia University Award for excellence in journalism in the public service (2020). Seasons one and two of In the Dark each received a Peabody Award. In 2023, the show was sold to The New Yorker. Since then, she was awarded a Pulitzer Grant to produce work on the 2005 massacre of civilians by US soldiers in Haditha, which became Season 3. This season won both a Pulitzer Prize and a Peabody Award.
