= Marie Clay =

New Zealand academic, educator, researcher (1926–2007)

Dame Marie Clay DBE FRSNZ
- Clay in 1974
- Born: Marie Mildred Irwin; 3 January 1926; Wellington, New Zealand
- Died: 13 April 2007 (aged 81); Auckland, New Zealand
- Occupations: Educationist, researcher

Dame Marie Mildred Clay DBE FRSNZ (/ˈmɑːri/ MAR-ee; née Irwin; 3 January 1926 – 13 April 2007) was a researcher from New Zealand known for her work in educational literacy. She was committed to the idea that children who struggle to learn to read and write can be helped with early intervention, but her proposed solutions have proved controversial. A clinical psychologist, she developed the Reading Recovery intervention, a whole language programme in New Zealand, and expanded it worldwide.

== Early life and education ==
Marie Mildred Irwin was born in Wellington, New Zealand, the daughter of accountant Donald Leolin Irwin and music teacher Mildred Blanche Godlier. Her parents separated when she was five. She attended four primary schools, then Wellington East Girls' College. She studied education at Victoria University College, graduating BA in 1947 and MA with second-class honours in 1949. Her masters thesis was entitled The teaching of reading in New Zealand special classes. She also received a Diploma of Education from the same institution in 1948. After studying clinical child psychology at the University of Minnesota as a Fulbright scholar, Clay received her PhD from the University of Auckland in 1966 after completing her doctoral thesis entitled Emergent reading behaviour. She was employed on the faculty of the University of Auckland from 1960.

== Career ==
Clay developed the Reading Recovery, a whole language intervention programme, which was adopted by all New Zealand schools in 1983. In 1985, teachers and researchers from Ohio State University brought Reading Recovery to the United States. Reading Recovery is an early intervention for at-risk students in grade one that is designed to close gaps within an average of 12–20 weeks.

In 1982, Clay was inducted into the International Reading Association's Reading Hall of Fame. In the 1987 New Year Honours, she was appointed a Dame Commander of the Order of the British Empire, for services to education. In 1992, she was elected president of the International Reading Association and was the first non-North American to hold this position.

Her teachers' guidebook, Reading Recovery: Guidelines for Teachers in Training, has sold more than eight million copies worldwide. She died in Auckland, New Zealand, at the age of 81 following a brief illness.

== Criticism of Reading Recovery ==
Reading Recovery use in Australia and New Zealand has reduced significantly over the last years because of a report from the New South Wales Department of Education concluded that Reading Recovery was largely ineffective, and should not be used for most children.

On 23 April 2022, the Center for Research in Education and Social Policy at the University of Delaware presented the results of a study of the long-term effects of Reading Recovery. The conclusion was that the "long-term impact estimates were significant and negative". The study found that children who received Reading Recovery had scores on state reading tests in third and fourth grade that were below the test scores of similar children who did not receive Reading Recovery. It suggests three possible hypotheses for this outcome:

1. While Reading Recovery produces large impacts on early literacy measures, it does not give students the required skills for success in later grades; or,
2. The gains are lost because students do not receive sufficient intervention in later grades; or,
3. The impacts of the early intervention was washed out by subsequent experiences.

In October 2022, American Public Media debuted a podcast called Sold a Story, discussing the negative impacts of Clay's theory on the teaching of reading in American public schools, as well as numerous studies that contradicted Clay's theory. In response, several international Reading Recovery affiliated institutions released a statement listing Clay's various awards as proof of the efficacy of her theory.

== Recognition ==
Faculty at Ohio State worked with Clay in the early 1980s, and she served as a distinguished visiting scholar there in 1984–85. The Ohio State University board of trustees approved the Marie Clay Endowed Chair in Reading Recovery and Early Literacy on 4 February 2005. In 2017 Clay was selected as one of the Royal Society Te Apārangi's "150 women in 150 words", celebrating the contribution of women to knowledge in New Zealand.

== Personal life ==
In 1951, she married civil engineer Warwick Victor Clay, with whom she had a son, Alan, and a daughter, Jenny. They were divorced in 1976.

== Selected bibliography ==
- Reading: The patterning of complex behaviour. Auckland, New Zealand: Heinemann. (Other editions 1979, 1985)
- Clay, Marie M (1989). Quadruplets and Higher Multiple Births. Oxford: Mac Keith Press. ISBN 0632024666. LCCN 92208042.
- Clay, Marie M (1992). Becoming Literate: The Construction of Inner Control. Portsmouth: Heinemann Education. ISBN 0868632791.
- Concepts About Print: What Have Children Learned About the Way We Print Language? (Heinemann, 2000)
- Change Over Time in Children's Literacy Development (Heinemann, 2001)
- By different paths to common outcomes. York, ME: Stenhouse, 1998.
- Reading Recovery: A guidebook for teachers in training. Portsmouth, NH: Heinemann, 1993.
- Literacy lessons designed for individuals part one: Why? When? And How? Portsmouth, NH: Heinemann, 2005.
- Literacy lessons designed for individuals part two: Teaching procedures. Portsmouth, NH: Heinemann, 2005.
