= Giving Thanks =

Giving Thanks is an American Public Media radio special that airs nationwide on Thanksgiving Day. It is hosted by John Birge. The show consists of classical music, songs, and dramatic readings all related to giving thanks.

Although John Birge began doing an annual Thanksgiving program in 1985, Giving Thanks did not go national until 1999, two years after he began working for American Public Media. The program started on Minnesota Public Radio. The readings relate to gratitude. In 2017, guests included Jacques Pepin and Francis Lam, who read his James Beard Award winning essay "The True Meaning of Turkey". Lynne Rosetto Kaspar read M. F. K. Fisher's essay "How to Be Cheerful While Starving". There were recordings of W. S. Merwin reading his poem "Gift" and Garrison Keillor reading John Berryman's "Minnesota Thanksgiving". In 2008, guests included Rabbi Harold Kushner and poet Galway Kinnell.

Recurring features are an excerpt from Charles Laughton's from his 1962 album The Story-Teller ... A Session with Charles Laughton about his experiences with Etienne Houvet and Alfred Manessier at Chartres Cathedral, and his reading from Jack Kerouac's The Dharma Bums. Musical pieces regularly included are Handel's Largo from Xerxes and selections from Aaron Copland's Appalachian Spring.

The 25th edition featured food experts Stanley Tucci, Nigella Lawson and Jacques Pepin, poets Billy Collins, Rita Dove, Nikki Giovanni and Ada Limon, poetry readings from Bill Moyers and Studs Terkel, the musicians Michael Tilson Thomas, John Rutter and Stephen Hough. There were readings in memory of the late John Updike reading Percy Shelley's "To a Skylark", Wendy Wasserstein, Nora Ephron and Rabbi Harold Kushner. Johann Sebastian Bach's music is frequent feature.
