= Miscue analysis =

Miscue analysis was originally developed by Ken Goodman for the purpose of understanding the reading process. It is a diagnostic tool that helps researchers/teachers gain insight into the reading process.

The term "miscue" was initiated by Ken Goodman to describe an observed response in the reading process that does not match the expected response. Goodman uses the term "miscue," rather than "error" or "mistake" to avoid value implications. He states that the departures from the text are not necessarily a negative aspect of the reading process but rather "windows on the reading process" (Goodman, 1969, p. 123).

== Studies ==
Miscue analysis procedures include the collection and examination of a single and complete oral reading experience followed by a retelling. The procedures and standards are outlined in both the Goodman Taxonomy and the Reading Miscue Inventory (Goodman, Watson, & Burke, 2005).

Miscue analysis differs significantly from other laboratory-centered or experimental diagnostic and evaluative instruments in that miscue research studies reading in as natural a condition as possible, with readers orally reading authentic and complete stories they have not been exposed to before. In this way, miscue analysis provides a naturalistic viewpoint and the resulting analysis of reading proficiency is both qualitative and quantitative.

To date, hundreds of studies on miscue analysis have been conducted from different perspectives to explore the reading process, to evaluate readers, and to improve reading instruction (Brown, Goodman, & Marek, 1996). Although their foci are different, these studies have generally confirmed Goodman's model and theory of reading view that reading is a meaning-seeking process in which readers use graphic, phonemic, syntactic, and semantic cues to make sense of texts.

== Philosophy ==
A key assumption of miscue analysis is that what readers do is neither accidental nor random. Rather, it is cued by language and personal experience (Goodman, 1973, p. 93). The insights gained from miscue analysis have contributed to the development of the Goodman Reading Model—a transactional, socio-psycholinguistic theory and model of reading.

Such analysis has made an ideological shift away from a deficit-oriented view of readers' weaknesses toward a view that appreciates the linguistic strengths that readers bring to the reading process as they construct meaning from a text. In addition, miscue analysis helps researchers/teachers evaluate reading materials, and thus provides them with an objective basis for selecting suitable texts for readers.

The most basic contribution of miscue analysis to knowledge of the reading process is its demonstration that reading is an active, receptive language process. Miscue analysis also helps researchers/teachers analyze the oral reading of individual readers.

== Opposing viewpoint ==
Goodman's approach has been criticized by other researchers who favor a phonics-based approach, and present research to support their viewpoint. From this perspective, good readers use decoding as their primary approach to reading, and use context to confirm that what they have read makes sense. Good readers decode rapidly and automatically. Poor readers, who have not developed this fluency skill, use such strategies as drawing from context in combination with looking at the picture or using only some of the letters in the words to predict a word that would make sense in context. Studies have shown that even good readers can correctly guess words in context only one out of ten times.

When students look at pictures as a reference, a strategy that is encouraged by whole language proponents, they will sometimes stop at the unknown word, look at the picture or consider the overall meaning of the sentence, then say a word that makes sense in context, rather than use graphophonemic clues. With such an approach, a child may read "I see a bunny," when in fact the last word in the sentence might read as "rabbit." Using miscue analysis, this would be recorded as a miscue that nevertheless preserves the meaning of the sentence, and the child would be encouraged to continue reading, even if such a word does not match the letters in the book. A teacher critical of this approach would note that the child did not use letter-sound correspondence to decode the word, and instead used the picture or context as a way to hypothesize what word makes sense in the text. Such a teacher would work with this child to make sure that he is paying attention to the letter-sound correspondence.

Critics of the phonics-based perspective point out that fluent readers are those who read both effectively and efficiently. They argue that to conceptualize fluent reading as involving a word-for-word match promotes an inefficient or slow and labored approach to reading. Fluent readers do not look at individual words but rather look at chunks of words and hypothesize approximately what the sentence says, slowing down to look at the word level only when, through self-monitoring, they realize their approximations or hypotheses about what the sentence says does not make sense. In fact, fluent adult readers miscue (or read something other than what the text says) 20–40% of the time. Reading in this way, as all fluent readers do, allows for efficient reading. Effective reading involves the ability to self-monitor and apply strategies such as phonics, looking at pictures, skipping words, or using synonym substitutions when coming to words that the reader does not know. In contrast to the argument that reduces the complexity of good reading to rapid and automatic decoding, this perspective acknowledges that all good readers come to words they do not know and constantly miscue, and that good reading is the ability to effectively solve problems that arise in reading through a range of strategies. As Pinnell and Fountas (1998) point out, English is a language made up of several distinct languages and therefore is not phonetically regular. Only about half of the words readers encounter can be efficiently decoded using phonetic knowledge. Therefore, a range of strategies are needed for effective reading.

== Shared perspective ==
Regardless of one's position on the centrality of phonics in reading, self-monitoring for meaning-making is critically important. From both a transactional perspective and a perspective that puts more emphasis on phonics in word solving, many poor readers will use the first letter or letters to guess at the identity of the word, and then continue reading even though the sentence with the inserted or miscued word does not make sense. A good reader will realize that the sentence does not make sense and will reread the sentence and the word and self-correct in order to be an effective reader.
