= Alphabetic principle =

Predictable and systematic relationship between letters and spoken sounds

According to the alphabetic principle, letters and combinations of letters are the symbols used to represent the speech sounds of a language based on systematic and predictable relationships between written letters, symbols, and spoken words. The alphabetic principle is the foundation of any alphabetic writing system (such as the English variety of the Latin alphabet, one of the more common types of writing systems in use today). In the education field, it is known as the alphabetic code.

Alphabetic writing systems that use an (in principle) almost perfectly phonemic orthography have a single letter (or digraph or, occasionally, trigraph) for each individual phoneme and a one-to-one correspondence between sounds and the letters that represent them, although predictable allophonic alternation is normally not shown. Such systems are used, for example, in the modern languages Serbo-Croatian (arguably, an example of perfect phonemic orthography), Macedonian, Estonian, Finnish, Italian, Romanian, Spanish, Georgian, Hungarian, Turkish, and Esperanto. The best cases have a straightforward spelling system, enabling a writer to predict the spelling of a word given its pronunciation and similarly enabling a reader to predict the pronunciation of a word given its spelling. Ancient languages with such almost perfectly phonemic writing systems include Avestic, Latin, Vedic, and Sanskrit (Devanāgarī—an abugida; see Vyakarana). On the other hand, French and English have a strong difference between sounds and symbols.

The alphabetic principle is closely tied to phonics, as it is the systematic relationship between spoken words and their visual representation (letters).

The alphabetic principle does not underlie logographic writing systems like Chinese or syllabic writing systems such as Japanese kana. Korean was formerly written partially with Chinese characters, but is now written in the fully alphabetic Hangul system, in which the letters are not written linearly, but arranged in syllabic blocks.

== Latin alphabet ==
Most orthographies that use the Latin writing system are imperfectly phonological and diverge from that ideal to a greater or lesser extent. This is because the ancient Romans designed the alphabet specifically for Latin. In the Middle Ages, it was adapted to the Romance languages, the direct descendants of Latin, as well as to the Celtic, Germanic, Baltic, and some Slavic languages, and finally to most of the languages of Europe.

=== English orthography ===
English orthography is based on the alphabetic principle, but the acquisition of sounds and spellings from a variety of languages and differential sound change within English have left Modern English spelling patterns confusing. Spelling patterns usually follow certain conventions but nearly every sound can be legitimately spelled with different letters or letter combinations. For example, the digraph ee almost always represents /i:/ (feed), but in many varieties of English the same sound can also be represented by a single e (be), the letter y (fifty), by i (graffiti) or the digraphs ie (field), ei (deceit), ea (feat), ey (key), eo (people), oe (amoeba), ae (aeon), is (debris), it (esprit), ui (mosquito) or these letter patterns: ee-e (cheese), ea-e (leave), i-e (ravine), e-e (grebe), ea-ue (league), ei-e (deceive), ie-e (believe), i-ue (antique), eip (receipt). On the other hand, one symbol, such as the digraph th, can represent more than one phoneme: voiceless interdental /θ/ as in thin, voiced interdental /ð/ as in this, simple /t/ as in Thomas, or even the consonant cluster /tθ/ as in eighth.

The spelling systems for some languages, such as Spanish or Italian, are relatively simple because they adhere closely to the ideal one-to-one correspondence between sounds and the letter patterns that represent them. In English the spelling system is more complex and varies considerably in the degree to which it follows uniform patterns. There are several reasons for this, including: first, the alphabet has 26 letters, but the English language has 40 sounds that must be reflected in word spellings; second, English spelling began to be standardized in the 15th century, and most spellings have not been revised to reflect the long-term changes in pronunciation that are typical for all languages; and third, English frequently adopts foreign words without changing the spelling of those words.

== Role in beginning reading ==
Learning the connection between written letters and spoken sounds has been viewed as a critical heuristic to word identification for decades. Understanding that there is a direct relationship between letters and sounds enables an emergent reader to decode the pronunciation of an unknown written word and associate it with a known spoken word. Typically, emergent readers identify the majority of unfamiliar printed words by sounding them out. Similarly, understanding the relationship of letters and sounds is also seen as a critical heuristic for learning to spell.

Two contrasting philosophies exist with regard to emergent readers learning to associate letters to speech sounds in English. Proponents of phonics argue that this relationship needs to be taught explicitly and to be learned to automaticity, in order to facilitate the rapid word recognition upon which comprehension depends. Others, including advocates of whole-language who hold that reading should be taught holistically, assert that children can naturally intuit the relationship between letters and sounds. This debate is often referred to as the reading wars.

== See also ==
- Dyslexia
- Orthographic depth
- Phonemic orthography
- Reading
- Synthetic phonics
