= Emily Hanford =

American education reporter

Emily Hanford is an American education reporter who hosted the APM Reports podcast Sold a Story. The Milwaukee Journal Sentinel called her "the most prominent figure in advocacy for big changes in reading instruction."

== Early life and education ==
Hanford grew up in Brookline, Massachusetts and graduated from Brookline High School. She attended Amherst College but became disillusioned with the experience, taking a two-year leave in 1991 before she returned to complete her B.A.

== Career ==
After graduating from Amherst, she worked as a reporter for WBEZ Chicago.

Since 2008, Hanford has reported for American Public Media, where she is a senior correspondent and producer and has focused on early childhood education. In 2016, she began reporting on the prevalence of remedial education for college students, leading to an interest in dyslexia supports.

Her 2022 podcast Sold a Story investigated allegations that the popular early-intervention literacy strategies developed by Marie Clay and promoted by Lucy Calkins are incompatible with educational and cognitive research. It argues that the cueing method of teaching reading ignores the importance of phonics. The podcast was widely influential in the national movement to reform reading instruction and reached more than 3.5 million downloads.

Hanford's work was cited during the consideration of a New Hampshire bill to revise the state's reading curriculum.

In April 2023, she received an award from the George W. Bush Presidential Center. Hanford covered Bush's work on literacy in Sold a Story.

== Personal life ==
Hanford is married and lives in the Washington, D.C. metropolitan area.
