= Analytic phonics =

Method of teaching reading

Analytic phonics (sometimes referred to as analytical phonics or implicit phonics) is a very common approach to the teaching of reading that starts at the word level, not at the sound (phoneme) level. It does not teach the blending of sounds together as is done in synthetic phonics. One method is to have students identify a common sound in a set of words that each contain that same sound. For example, the teacher and student discuss how the following words are alike: pat, park, push and pen. Analytic phonics is often taught together with levelled-reading books, look-say practice, and the use of aids such as phonics worksheets.

Analytic phonics can also help with spelling. For example, a student learns that the initial sound in pig is the same as that in pen and pat, so they conclude that they must write that sound with the same letter (grapheme) "p".

Sometimes, analytic phonics is referred to as Implicit phonics because the understanding of the sound-letters connection is implied and not necessarily taught directly.

Analog phonics is a subset of analytic phonics that uses the onset-rhyme of many words. In the word snap, "sn" is the onset and "ap" is the rime (the part starting with the vowel). So, snap rhymes with map, sap, clap, and so on.

Analytic phonics is different from synthetic phonics (that starts at the individual sound/phoneme level and builds up to the whole word), and whole language (that starts at the word level and does not encourage the use of phonics). It may, however, be used as a part of the balanced literacy approach.

== Practice and approach ==
Implicit phonics is moving from the whole to the smallest parts; "blending-and-building" is not usually taught. A student will identify new words by its shape, beginning and ending letters, any context clues from the rest of the sentence or any accompanying pictures.

== Shortcomings of this approach ==
A major problem with analytic phonic methods is the erroneous assumption that all students will already have the fairly sophisticated phonemic awareness skills needed to enable the comparison of sounds within the various words. Implicit instruction relies on readers "discovering" clues about sound-spelling relationships; good readers can do this, but poor readers are not likely to do so.

== Controversy: analytic vs. synthetic approaches ==
Phonics has become an acceptable practice and approach to teaching students to read. However, there are different methods in which it is used, and disagreement over which approach is best.

There are two primary approaches to teaching phonics: analytic phonics and synthetic phonics. Both approaches require the learner to have some phonological awareness (the ability to hear and discriminate sounds in spoken words). Both approaches can also contribute to furthering the student's phonological development. Phonological awareness is an essential skill for reading, writing, listening and talking.

Synthetic phonics involves the development of phonemic awareness from the outset. As part of the decoding process, the reader learns up to 44 phonemes (the smallest units of sound) and their related graphemes (the written symbols for the phoneme).

In contrast, analytic phonics, involves the analysis of whole words to detect phonetic or orthographic (spelling) patterns, then splitting them into smaller parts to help with decoding.

Supporters of synthetic phonics argue that if the systematic teaching of phonics doesn't take place, analytic learners can fall behind and fail to develop the tools they need for decoding words.

== See also ==
- Reading
- Phonemic awareness
- Phonetics
