= Ken Goodman =

American academic (1927–2020)

- Born: Kenneth S. Goodman; December 23, 1927; Chicago, Illinois, United States
- Died: March 12, 2020 (aged 92); Tucson, Arizona, U.S.
- Known for: Whole Language
- Spouse: Yetta Goodman
- Children: 3 daughters

Academic background
- Education: University of Michigan (BA), University of California Los Angeles (MA, PhD)

Academic work
- Discipline: Education, linguistics
- Institutions: University of Arizona; Wayne State University
- Website: www.readinghalloffame.org/sites/default/files/kensnewlongvita2017.rtf_.pdf

Kenneth S. Goodman (December 23, 1927 – March 12, 2020) was an American educator and researcher known for his work in reading theory, linguistics, and education. Goodman has been described in educational research sources as a key figure in the development of the whole language approach to reading. He is also known for his development of miscue analysis. He last worked as an Emeritus Professor of Language, Reading and Culture at the University of Arizona. His theories were the subject of debate in reading education throughout the late twentieth century.

== Biography ==
Goodman was born in Chicago in 1927. After obtaining a bachelor's degree in Economics from the University of Michigan, he completed a master's degree and a doctorate in education from the University of California, Los Angeles (UCLA). Goodman taught at Wayne State University in Michigan before joining the University of Arizona as a professor in 1975.

Goodman was a board member of the International Literacy Association from 1976 to 1979, and its president from 1980 to 1981. He was awarded the William S. Gray Citation of Merit by the International Literacy Association in 1986.

He met his wife, Yetta Goodman, when they were both Jewish Community Center camp counselors. Goodman died on March 12, 2020, in Tucson, Arizona. The cause of his death was described as "several underlying health issues" by his wife.

== Theory ==
Goodman proposed that written language development parallels oral language development, and applied ideas from linguistics to reading. This perspective influenced the whole language movement, which was further developed by Yetta Goodman, Regie Routman, Frank Smith and others. Subsequent research in cognitive science by Sally Shaywitz and others has challenged the notion that reading develops naturally without systematic instruction. Critics of Goodman's model, including researchers aligned with the science of reading, have argued that skilled reading relies heavily on decoding and phonics instruction. Concepts like the ‘three cueing’ model associated with whole language have been characterized as controversial and are not supported by some contemporary reading science research. Goodman's book What's Whole in Whole Language, originally published in 1986, sold more than 250,000 copies and was translated into French, Spanish, Portuguese, Japanese, and Chinese.

== Achievements ==
Goodman held several leadership positions, such as President of the International Reading Association, President of the National Conference on Research in Language and Literacy, and President of the Center for Expansion of Language and Thinking from 1980 to 1981 and at-large Board member from 1976 to 1979.

He collaborated with the National Council of Teachers of English on initiatives related to literacy research and reading instruction. He received a number of awards, including the James Squire award from NCTE for contributions to the profession and NCTE in 2007. Goodman published over 150 articles and book chapters as well as a number of books. In addition to What's Whole in Whole Language, he also wrote Ken Goodman on Reading and Phonics Phacts; all were published by Heinemann. His book Scientific Realism in Studies of Education was published by Taylor and Francis in 2007. His last book, "Reading- The Grand Illusion: How and Why People Make Sense of Print" was published by Routledge in 2016 and included contributions from linguist Peter H. Fries and neurologist Steven L. Strauss.

Goodman was inducted into the Reading Hall of Fame in 1989.
