= Balanced literacy =

Theory of teaching reading and writing

Balanced literacy is an approach to teaching reading and writing the English language that arose in the 1990s and has a variety of interpretations. Its proponents state that balanced literacy strikes a compromise between whole language and phonics, ending the conflict between the two teaching styles. Critics state that balanced literacy, in practice usually is synonymous with the whole language approach to reading.

Balanced literacy uses research-based elements of comprehension, vocabulary, fluency, phonemic awareness and phonics and includes instruction in a combination of the whole group, small group and 1:1 instruction in reading, writing, speaking and listening with the strongest research-based elements of each. Proponents say that the components of a balanced literacy approach include many different strategies applied during reading and writing workshops.

On the other hand, critics say balanced literacy, like whole language, is a meaning-based approach that when implemented does not include the explicit teaching of sound-letter relationships as provided by systematic phonics and Structured literacy. And that it is effective only for children to whom learning to read comes easily, which is less than half of students.

== Reading ==
During balanced literacy reading workshops, skills are explicitly modeled during mini-lessons. The mini-lesson has four parts: the connection, the teach (demonstration), the active engagement and the link. The teacher chooses a skill and strategy that the class needs to be taught based on assessments conducted in the classroom. During the connection phase, the teacher connects prior learning to the current skill the students are currently learning. The teacher announces the teaching point or the skill and strategy. In this approach, the teacher shows students how to accomplish the skill by modeling the strategy in a book the students are familiar with. The teacher likewise uses a "think aloud" in this method to share thoughts and then allow the students to work this out in their own books or in the teacher's book during the active engagement. During the link phase, the teacher reminds students about the strategies they can do while they are reading.

Shared reading is when the students read from a shared text. Often this is a big book projected on screen using a website or documents camera. If possible, students should have their own copies also. Students and the teacher read aloud and share their thinking about the text. During mini-lessons, interactive read-aloud and shared reading the class will create anchor charts. These anchor charts remind students how and when to use different skills and strategies.

Guided reading is a small group activity where more of the responsibility belongs to the student. Students read from a leveled text. They use the skills directly taught during mini-lessons, interactive read aloud and shared reading to increase their comprehension and fluency. The teacher is there to provide prompting and ask questions. Guided reading is intended to allow for differentiation in the classroom. Groups are created around reading levels, and students move up when they note that the entire group is ready. During guided reading time the other students may be engaged in reading workstations that reinforce various skills or partner or independent reading. They often work in pairs during this time. Stations can include a library, big book, writing, drama, puppets, word study, poetry, computer, listening, puzzles, buddy reading, projector/promethean board, creation station, science, social studies.

Independent reading is simply students reading self-selected texts independently. Students choose books based on interest and independent reading level.

Word study content depends on the grade level and the needs of the student. Kindergarten begins with phonemic awareness, then adds print for phonics, sight word work, and common rimes/onset. In first and second grade, phonics work intensifies as students apply their knowledge in their writing including adding endings, prefixes, suffixes, and use of known sight words to study other words. To "know" a word means the student can read it, write it, spell it and use it in conversation.

== Writing ==
The second half of balanced literacy is the writing component giving students practice writing, for extended periods of time, on topics of their choice. Allowing students to write about topics they find interesting gives them a sense of ownership.

There are four main components of the writing workshop: the mini-lesson, check-in, writing/conferring time, and sharing.

The mini-lesson is a whole class activity. The teacher introduces a skill or strategy they want students to be able to apply during the independent writing time. Examples of skills or strategies could include: using strong verbs; how to transition from one idea to another; the importance of adding vivid details; how to organize writing with a beginning, middle, and end, and tips for writing a good introduction or conclusion.

Just before the students begin writing, the teacher will check in to see where each student is in the writing process. This is a quick check-in to check their status and make sure someone is not stuck in one area.

After modeling the skill or strategy taught during the mini-lesson, students then begin writing independently, putting those new skills to work. Students utilize all the steps of the writing process: brainstorming, drafting, revising, editing, and publishing. Depending on the size of the writing piece, this may take place in one session, or over several days. While the students are writing, the teacher is conferencing one-on-one with each student. Meeting with students individually, allows the teacher to target specific skills for each student. Each conference lasts approximately five minutes with the goal being to meet with each student at least once a week. At times, peer conferencing may also take place, where students seek feedback from their peers.

The final step in the writing workshop is sharing. This is a crucial element, almost as much as the writing itself. This process allows students to show off their work and take ownership for what they have written.

== Implementation ==
Balanced literacy is implemented through the Reading and Writing Workshop Model. The teacher begins by modeling the reading/writing strategy that is the focus of the workshop during a mini-lesson (see above description) Then, students read leveled texts independently or write independently for an extended period of time as the teacher circulates amongst them to observe, record observations and confer. At the culmination of the workshop session, selected students share their strategies and work with the class.

It is recommended that guided reading be implemented during the extended independent reading period. Based upon assessment, the teacher works with small groups of students (no more than 6 students in each group) on a leveled text (authentic trade book). The teacher models specific strategies before reading and monitors students while they read independently. After reading, the teacher and students engage in activities in word study, fluency, and comprehension. The purpose of Guided Reading is to systematically scaffold the decoding and/or comprehension strategy skills of students who are having similar challenges.

Direct Instruction in phonics and Word Study are also included in the balanced literacy approach. For emergent and early readers, the teacher plans and implements phonics based mini-lessons. After the teacher explicitly teaches a phonemic element, students practice reading and/or writing other words following the same phonemic pattern. For advanced readers, the teacher focuses on the etymology of a word. Students who are reading at this stage are engaged in analyzing the patterns of word derivations, root words, prefixes and suffixes.

The overall purpose of balanced literacy instruction is to provide students with a differentiated instructional program which will support the reading and writing skill development of each individual.

== Comprehension strategies ==
Children are taught to use comprehension strategies including: sequencing, relating background knowledge, making inferences, comparing and contrasting, summarizing, synthesizing, problem-solving, distinguishing between fact and opinion, finding the main idea, and supporting details.

During the Reading and Writing Workshop teachers use scaffolded instruction as follows:

- Teacher modeling or showing kids what a reader does when reading a text, thinking aloud about the mental processes used to construct meaning while reading a book aloud to the class.
- Active Engagement during the mini-lesson; students try the work they were shown by the teacher.
- Link Students are reminded of all the strategies they can do as readers and writers.
- Independent practice where children begin to work alone while reading books by themselves, trying out the work they have been taught by the teacher, not only on that day but any previous lessons as well.
- Application of the strategy is achieved when the students can correctly apply comprehension strategies to different kinds of texts and are no longer just practicing but are making connections between and can demonstrate understanding through writing or discussion.

Throughout this process, students progress from having a great deal of teacher support to being independent learners. The teacher support is removed gradually as the students acquire the strategies needed to understand the text by themselves.

== Reception and critics ==
Critics such as Diane Ravitch say that balanced literacy may use elements of phonics and whole language but it focuses mainly on reading strategies such as "predicting what they will read, visualizing what they will read, inferring the meaning of what they have read, reading alone, reading in a group, and so on". Others, such as Louisa C. Moats, say that balanced literacy is just whole language "wearing the fig leaf of balanced instruction".

Neuroscientist Mark Seidenberg, a proponent of the science of reading and the teaching of phonics, writes that balanced literacy purports to end the reading wars "without resolving the underlying issues", and that "balanced literacy provided little guidance for teachers who thought that phonics was a cause of poor reading and did not know how to teach it". In particular, he does not support practices such as the three cueing systems or encouraging struggling readers to skip over or guess puzzling words.

Timothy Shanahan, a well-known literacy educator and researcher, is on record as saying he does not support the reading workshop because "it definitely is not research based" and the workshop method is not particularly supportive of reading instruction.

Critics further state that teachers should use methods derived from best practices and supported by scientific research, and children need instruction in systematic phonics.

== See also ==
- Analytic phonics
- Dual-route hypothesis to reading aloud
- Phonics
- Reading
- Reading education in the United States
- Simple view of reading
- Structured literacy
- Synthetic phonics
- Whole language
