= Reid Lyon =

American neuroscientist

- Born: George Reid Lyon; 1949 (age 76–77)

Academic background
- Education: North Carolina Wesleyan University; University of New Mexico
- Thesis: The neuropsychological characteristics of subgroups of learning disabled readers (1978)

Reid Lyon (born 1949) is a neuroscientist (neuropsychology), specialist in learning disorders, and researcher on the science of reading.

== Early life, military service, and education ==
Lyon had difficulty learning to read as a child, receiving help from his mother in decoding words. While his reading improved over time, he did not become proficient until middle school. Lyon credits his reading difficulties as part of his motivation to study the neurobiological basis of individual differences in reading development.

Lyon joined the army in 1967, and was a paratrooper, recon sergeant, and "tunnel rat" for fifteen months in Vietnam, including in the Tet Offensive, winning the Bronze Star, the Combat Infantryman Badge, , the Parachutist Badge, the Vietnamese Cross of Gallantry, with Palm, and the Army Commendation Medal among others.

After returning home, he attended North Carolina Wesleyan University, receiving a BA in psychology in 1973 then an MA and Ph.D. with highest honors in Neuropsychology (neuroscience) and Learning Disorders and Disabilities (combined five year program) from the University of New Mexico, followed by a fellowship in neuroscience at the University of New Mexico Medical Center the following year.

== Career ==
Lyon joined the faculty of Communication Science and Disorders at Northwestern University in 1980 where he also directed the neuropsychology laboratory. In 1983 Lyon was recruited by the Stern Center for Language and Learning where he served as the director of research and a clinical associate associate professor of neurology at the University of Vermont Medical School. He served as a member of the NIH Maternal and Child Health Review Group/Study Section and chaired review groups evaluating NICHD Dyslexia program projects and the NICHD Learning Disability Research Centers.

From 1992 to 2005, Lyon served as a research neuropsychologist and the chief of the Child Development and Behavior Branch of the NICHD at the National Institutes of Health; in this role he developed and oversaw research programs in cognitive neuroscience, learning and reading development and disorders, behavioral pediatrics, cognitive and affective development, School Readiness, and the Spanish to English Reading Research program. He designed, developed and directed the 44-site NICHD Reading Research Network.

Lyon testified yearly from 1997 to 2005 before Senate and House committees informing them of progress in the science of reading, learning disabilities, Head Start, early childhood development, and the translation of science into policy.

As part of his role at the NIH, Lyon advised President George W. Bush and First Lady Laura Bush on reading science, reading development and disorders, and early childhood development. He advised the George W. Bush administration on education science to policy contributing to the No Child Left Behind and especially the Reading First program.

He also worked on the Definition Consensus Project with the International Dyslexia Association and he co-authored the publication that defined dyslexia.

Lyon is the author and co-author of over 130 per reviewed journal articles, books, and book chapters addressing developmental neuroscience, learning and reading disorders/dyslexia, and the translation of science into practice and policy.

After leaving the NIH, Lyon had professorships at the University of Texas, Dallas and Southern Methodist University, then served at the Lee County VA Clinic in Cape Coral, Florida, helping veterans with substance abuse and PTSD.

== Honors ==
Lyon is a distinguished scientist emeritus in neuroscience and cognition at the Center for BrainHealth at the University of Texas, Dallas and a distinguished professor emeritus at Southern Methodist University. He received the NIH Directors Award twice. Once for his contributions to the neuroscience of learning and learning disorders. The second for his design and development of the NICHD Reading Research Program. Among other awards, Lyon was a recipient of the 2000 Samuel Torrey Orton Award from and gave the 2005 Norman Geschwind Memorial Lecture to the International Dyslexia Association. He also received the Vietnam Veterans of America Excellence in The Sciences Award for contributions to educating veterans about the neuroscience of Combat PTSD in 2013.
