= American Public Media =

American public radio program producer and distributor

- Type: Non-profit organization
- Founded: August 2004; 22 years ago in Collegeville, Minnesota, U.S.
- Headquarters: Saint Paul, Minnesota, U.S.
- Number of employees: 477
- Parent: Minnesota Public Radio; American Public Media Group
- Website: www.americanpublicmedia.org

American Public Media (APM) is an American company that produces and distributes public radio programs in the United States, the second largest company of its type after NPR. Its nonprofit parent, American Public Media Group, also owns and operates radio stations in Minnesota and California. Its station brands include Minnesota Public Radio and Southern California Public Radio. Based in Saint Paul, Minnesota, APM is best known for distribution of the national financial news program Marketplace.

== Historical ties to Public Radio International ==
Formerly, much of American Public Media's programming content was distributed by Public Radio International, which itself was named American Public Radio, or APR, until July 1, 1994. APR was formed by four stations—the Minnesota Public Radio network, WGBH in Boston, WNYC in New York, and KUSC in Los Angeles—to distribute A Prairie Home Companion. PRI owns and produces numerous programs today, but still also distributes diverse programming from many sources. In contrast, APM, which was founded in 2004, predominantly distributes content that it owns and produces itself; exceptions include The Story with Dick Gordon (which ended production in October 2013), the distribution to US stations of the BBC World Service, and the BBC Proms broadcasts from Royal Albert Hall in London.

The split happened as MPR and PRI began seeing each other more as potential competitors after MPR lost the partnership to WGBH to produce The World, and MPR purchased PRI-distributed Marketplace for its own distribution channels.

== APM Reports ==
APM Reports is the investigative journalism unit of APM, based in St. Paul, Minnesota. Established in November 2015, APM Reports' journalists are drawn from Minnesota Public Radio and the former American RadioWorks. It produces documentary as well as investigative journalism. In 2019, APM Reports journalists Madeleine Baran and Samara Freemark received a Polk Award for season 2 of In the Dark, their investigation into the case of Curtis Flowers, who was tried six times for a quadruple murder in Winona, Mississippi in 1996. This was the first Polk Award given to a podcast. The In the Dark journalists also won two Peabody Awards, in 2016 and 2020, for the first and second seasons of In the Dark. In 2023, the APM Reports educational team, with journalist Emily Hanford, won a Edward R. Murrow Award (Radio Television Digital News Association) for Sold a Story: How Teaching Kids to Read Went So Wrong.

== APM Research Lab ==
APM Research Lab is the research and data journalism unit of American Public Media. The Lab was established in 2017 under the leadership of American Public Media Group's CEO Jon McTaggart and EVP Dave Kansas with the hiring of its inaugural Managing Partner, Craig Helmstetter. The Lab was created to further strengthen APM's commitment to factual information as indicated by the tagline "bringing facts into focus." The unit has conducted several research projects in collaboration with newsrooms within the American Public Media Group and beyond, including partnerships with Marketplace, Minnesota Public Radio News, and PBS/Frontline and the Texas Newsroom.

In 2020 the Lab began publishing a project called Color of Coronavirus that tracks deaths due to COVID-19 by race and ethnicity in each U.S. state as well as the nation as a whole. This project has been cited hundreds of times, including by The Guardian, The Atlantic, Newsweek, The Washington Post, The New York Times, and the Journal of the American Medical Association.

== Classical South Florida ==
Until July 2015, APM operated Classical South Florida (WMLV-FM 89.7), which was sold to Educational Media Foundation, a California-based religious broadcasting company that airs contemporary Christian music; it now brands itself as a K-Love station.

== Programs distributed ==
APM also distributes:

- BBC World Service
- Classical 24
- Composers Datebook
- The Daily
- Marketplace and companion programs
- The Dinner Party Download
- On Point
- Performance Today
- Pipedreams
- The Splendid Table
- SymphonyCast

Several specials are also distributed by APM on a less frequent basis, including a number of Christmas programs, Giving Thanks at Thanksgiving, and the BBC Proms.

== People ==
- Madeleine Baran, host and lead reporter of In The Dark
- Lynne Rossetto Kasper, former host of The Splendid Table
- Francis Lam, host of The Splendid Table
- Nora McInerny, host of Terrible, Thanks for Asking
- John Moe, former host of Hilarious World of Depression
- Kai Ryssdal, host of Marketplace and co-host of Make Me Smart
- Molly Wood, former Marketplace tech correspondent and former co-host of Make Me Smart with Kai and Molly
- Dave Kansas, former President of American Public Media

=== Accolades ===
| Year | Award | Category | Nominee(s) | Result | Ref. |
|---|---|---|---|---|---|
| 2022 | Peabody Awards | Podcast & Radio | Sold a Story: How Teaching Kids to Read Went So Wrong | Nominated | |
