= Sold a Story =

Education podcast

Sold a Story is a serial podcast. The podcast is distributed by American Public Media and created and hosted by Emily Hanford.

Season 1, "How Teaching Kids to Read Went So Wrong", focused on reading instruction in America. The trailer for Season 2, "What Happened to Teaching", was released on October 1, 2026.

== See also ==
- Phonics
- Reading
- Science of reading
- Simple view of reading
- Structured literacy
- Systematic phonics
