= Synthetic phonics =

Teaching reading by blending and segmenting the sounds of the letters

Synthetic phonics, also known as blended phonics or inductive phonics, is a method of teaching English reading which first teaches letter-sounds (grapheme/phoneme correspondences) and then how to blend (synthesise) these sounds to achieve full pronunciation of whole words.

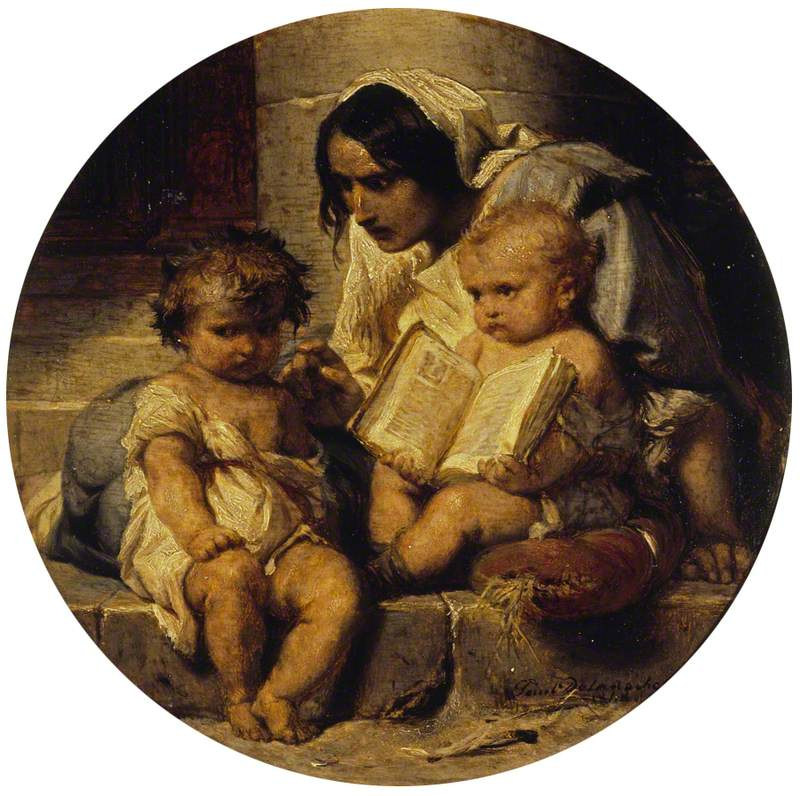
A Child Learning to Read, Paul Delaroche (1797–1856)

== Overview ==
Synthetic phonics refers to a family of programmes which aim to teach reading and writing through the following methods:

- Teaching students the correspondence between written letters (graphemes) and speech sounds (phonemes), known as “grapheme/phoneme correspondences” or “GPCs” or simply “letter-sounds”. For example, the words me and pony have the same sound at the end, but use different letters.
- Teaching students to read words by blending: identifying the graphemes (letters) in the word, recalling the corresponding phonemes (sounds), and saying the phonemes together to form the sound of the whole word.
- Teaching students to write words by segmenting spoken words: identifying the phonemes of the word, recalling the corresponding graphemes, then writing the graphemes together to form the written word.

Synthetic phonics programmes have some or all of the following characteristics:

- Teaching letter-sounds out of alphabetic order, following an order determined by the number of words that can be spelled with those letter-sounds at an early stage (e.g., more than 50 words can be spelled using only the most common sounds corresponding to s, a, t, i, p, n).
- Teaching the reading and writing of words in order of increasing irregularity, in other words teaching words which use typical letter-sounds first (e.g. fan and ape), and teaching words with more unusual letter-sounds later (e.g. phone and eight).

Synthetic phonics programmes do not have the following characteristics:

- Encouraging students to guess words from contextual clues (see whole language method).
- Encouraging students to memorise the shape of words, to recall them by sight without first identifying the letter-sounds and blending them (see Look say method).
- Teaching grapheme-phoneme correspondence on a "when needed" basis or as applied to particular groups of words, when these words arise in other forms of reading instruction (see embedded phonics in Whole language).

== Methodology ==
Synthetic phonics teaches the phonemes (sounds) associated with the graphemes (letters) usually at the rate of three to six letter-sounds per week. The sounds are taught in isolation then blended together (i.e. synthesised), all-through-the-word. For example, learners might be taught a short vowel sound (e.g. a as in cat) in addition to some consonant sounds (e.g. s, t, p). Then the learners are taught words with these sounds (e.g. sat, pat, tap, at). They are taught to pronounce each phoneme in a word, then to blend the phonemes together to form the word (e.g. s - a - t; "sat"). Sounds are taught in all positions of the words, but the emphasis is on all-through-the-word segmenting and blending from week one. It does not teach whole words as shapes (initial sight vocabulary) prior to learning the alphabetic code.

When learners can read enough words with letter-sounds they have learned, by saying the sounds and blending them, they are introduced to texts that include only words with those letter-sounds. These texts provide practice in word reading, increase confidence and reward effort.

Synthetic phonics develops phonemic awareness along with the corresponding letter shapes. It involves the learners rehearsing the writing of letter shapes, preferably with the tripod pencil grip, alongside learning the letter-sounds. Dictation is a frequent teaching technique from letter level to word spelling, and eventually extending to text level. Synthetic phonics does not teach letter names until the learners know common letter-sounds thoroughly and how to blend sounds for reading and segment spoken words for spelling. Often when letter names are introduced it is through singing an alphabet song.

Synthetic phonics teaches phonics at the level of the individual phoneme from the outset; not syllables and not onset and rime. Teachers are to put accuracy before speed, because fluency (i.e. speed, accuracy, expression) and comprehension will come with time.

Synthetic phonics involves the teaching of the transparent alphabet (e.g. c as in "cat") before progressing onto the opaque alphabet (e.g. ch as in "school"). In other words, learners are taught steps that are straightforward and 'work' before being taught the complications and variations of pronunciation and spelling of the full alphabetic code. It introduces exception words and 'tricky' words (words with letter-sounds that have not yet been taught or are unusual), after a thorough introduction of the transparent alphabet code (learning a common spelling for each of the 40-plus sounds of English and how to blend sounds for reading and segment spoken words for spelling). English has a surprisingly large number of words with unusual letter-sounds, often the most common words of all, such as 'to', 'of', etc. They are taught slowly and systematically. The phonics application still works at least in part in such words.

Synthetic phonics involves a heavy emphasis on hearing the sounds all-through-the-word for spelling and not an emphasis on "look, cover, write, check". This latter, visual form of spelling plays a larger part with unusual spellings and spelling variations, although a phonemic procedure is always emphasised in spelling generally.

Teachers read aloud a full range of literature with the learners and ensure that all learners have a full range of experience of activities associated with literacy such as role play, drama, poetry, but the learners are not expected to 'read' text with words they cannot read in or out of context, and the method does not involve guessing at words from context, picture or initial letter clues.

=== Typical programme ===
- learning letter sounds (as distinct from the letter names); For example, mm not em, ss not ess, ff not ef. The letter names can be taught later and are not usually taught in the early stages.
- learning the 40+ sounds of English and their common corresponding letters;

The English Alphabet Code 'Key': 40+ phonemes with their common 'sound pattern' representations. This is based on the typical British pronunciation. The number of the 40+ phonemes varies according to accent and analysis for some regions in the UK and for other English-speaking countries, such as Australia, Canada, and the United States.

For a more complete list of alternative spellings of the sounds, see English orthography § Sound-to-spelling correspondences.

Vowels:

- a - mat
- a-e - ape, baby, rain, tray, they, eight
- air - square, bear
- ar - jar, far
- e - fed, bread
- ee - sweet, me, beach, key
- eer - deer, hear
- er - computer, errand
- i - pig, stick
- i-e - kite, wild, light, pie
- o - bought, quality

- oa - oak, rope, bow, piano
- oi - coin, boy
- oo - (short) book, would, put
- oo - (long) moon, crew, blue, fruit
- ow - down, house
- or - fork, pork, store
- u - plug, glove
- ur - burn, teacher, first
- u-e - tune, unicorn, hue
- uh - button, chug

Consonants:

- b - boy, rabbit
- c / k - cat, key, duck, school, quit
- ch - chip, watch, statue
- d - dog, ladder
- f - fish, coffee, photo, tough
- g - gate, egg, ghost
- h - hat, whole
- j - jet, giant, cage, bridge
- k-s - box

- l - lip, bell, sample
- m - man, hammer, comb
- n - nut, dinner, knee, gnat
- ng - ring, singer
- p - pan, happy
- r - rat, cherry, write
- s / c - sun, dress, house, city, mice
- sh - ship, mission, station, chef

- t - tap, letter, debt
- th - thank
- th - that
- v - vet, sleeve
- w - wet, wheel, queen
- y - yes, new
- z - zip, fizz, sneeze, is, cheese
- g-z - exist
- zh - treasure

== Systematic phonics ==
The National Reading Panel concluded that systematic phonics instruction is more effective than unsystematic phonics or non-phonics instruction.

Systematic phonics is not one specific method of teaching phonics; it is a term used to describe phonics approaches that are taught explicitly and in a structured, systematic manner. They are systematic because the letters and the sounds they relate to are taught in a specific sequence, as opposed to incidentally or on a "when needed" basis.

The National Reading Panel (NRP) concluded that systematic phonics instruction is more effective than unsystematic phonics or non-phonics instruction. The NRP also found that systematic phonics instruction is effective (with varying degrees) when delivered through one-to-one tutoring, small groups, and teaching classes of students; and is effective from kindergarten onward, the earlier the better. It helps significantly with word-reading skills and reading comprehension for kindergartners and 1st graders as well as for older struggling readers and reading disabled students. Benefits to spelling were positive for kindergartners and 1st graders but not for older students.

Systematic phonics does not include methods such as embedded phonics and phonics mini lessons which are found in the Whole Language approach and the Balanced Literacy approach.

Systematic phonics is sometimes mischaracterized as "skill and drill" with little attention to meaning. However, researchers point out that this impression is false. Teachers can use engaging games or materials to teach letter-sound connections, and it can also be incorporated with the reading of meaningful text.

Phonics can be taught systematically in a variety of ways, such as: analogy phonics, analytic phonics, phonics through spelling, and synthetic phonics. However, their effectiveness vary considerably because the methods differ in such areas as the range of letter-sound coverage, the structure of the lesson plans, and the time devoted to specific instructions.

Systematic phonics has gained increased acceptance in different parts of the world since the completion of four major studies into teaching reading; one in the US in 2000, another in Australia in 2005, another in the UK in 2006, and another in Canada in 2022.

In 2009, the UK Department of Education published a curriculum review that added support for systematic phonics. In fact, systematic phonics in the UK is known as Synthetic phonics. It's often referred to as ‘systematic’ synthetic phonics because children learn about the various sounds, spellings, and grapheme-phoneme correspondences (GPCs) in a structured manner.

Beginning as early as 2014, several states in the United States have changed their curriculum to include systematic phonics instruction in elementary school.

In 2018, the State Government of Victoria, Australia, published a website containing a comprehensive Literacy Teaching Toolkit including Effective Reading Instruction, Phonics, and Sample Phonics Lessons.

=== Analytic phonics and analogy phonics ===
Analytic phonics does not involve pronouncing individual sounds (phonemes) in isolation and blending the sounds, as is done in synthetic phonics. Rather, it is taught at the word level and students learn to analyse letter-sound relationships once the word is identified. For example, students might be asked to practice saying words with similar sounds such as ball, bat and bite. Furthermore, students are taught consonant blends (separate, adjacent consonants) as units, such as br in break and or shr in shrouds.

Analogy phonics is a particular type of analytic phonics in which the teacher has students analyse phonic elements according to the speech sounds (phonograms) in the word. For example, a type of phonogram (known in linguistics as a rime) is composed of the vowel and the consonant sounds that follow it (e.g. in the words cat, mat and sat, the rime is "at".) Teachers using the analogy method may have students memorize a bank of phonograms, such as -at or -am, or use word families (e.g. can, ran, man, or may, play, say).

There have been studies on the effectiveness of instruction using analytic phonics vs. synthetic phonics. Johnston et al. (2012) conducted experimental research studies that tested the effectiveness of phonics learning instruction among 10-year-old boys and girls. They used comparative data from the Clackmannanshire Report and chose 393 participants to compare synthetic phonics instruction and analytic phonics instruction. The boys taught by the synthetic phonics method had better word reading than the girls in their classes, and their spelling and reading comprehension was as good. On the other hand, with analytic phonics teaching, although the boys performed as well as the girls in word reading, they had inferior spelling and reading comprehension. Overall, the group taught by synthetic phonics had better word reading, spelling, and reading comprehension. And, synthetic phonics did not lead to any impairment in the reading of irregular words.

=== Synthetic phonics ===
Synthetic phonics uses the concept of 'synthesising', which means 'putting together' or 'blending'. This is where sounds prompted by the letters are synthesised to pronounce the word.

== Common terminology ==
Some common terminology used within this article includes:

- alphabetic code (in synthetic phonics): The relationship between sounds (phonemes) and the letter/s (graphemes) that represent them are referred to as a "code". For example, the sound ay can be represented in many ways (e.g. cake, may, they, eight, aid, break, etc.). See also: Alphabetic principle
- decoding skills (in phonics): Without the use of context, to pronounce and read words accurately by using the relationship between the letter(s) and the sounds they represent. (i.e. cat is k - a - t, plough is p - l - ow, and school is s - k - oo - l. Encoding skills (i.e. spelling) is the same process in reverse.
- Direct instruction (also known as explicit instruction): A teaching style that is characterized by "carefully designed instruction" that usually includes a fast pace, small steps, demonstrations, active participation, coaching, immediate correction, and positive feedback.
- intensive instruction: teaching or tutoring that include some of the following: more time; peer-assisted strategies; and instruction in small groups or one-on-one.
- peer-assisted literacy strategies: learners work in pairs (taking turns as teacher and learner) to learn a structured sequence of literacy skills, such as phonemic awareness, phonics, sound blending, passage reading, and story retelling.
- supportive instruction: teaching or tutoring that supports the student both emotionally and cognitively. This includes encouragement, immediate feedback, positive reinforcement, and instructional scaffolding (i.e. clear structure, small steps, guiding with questions).

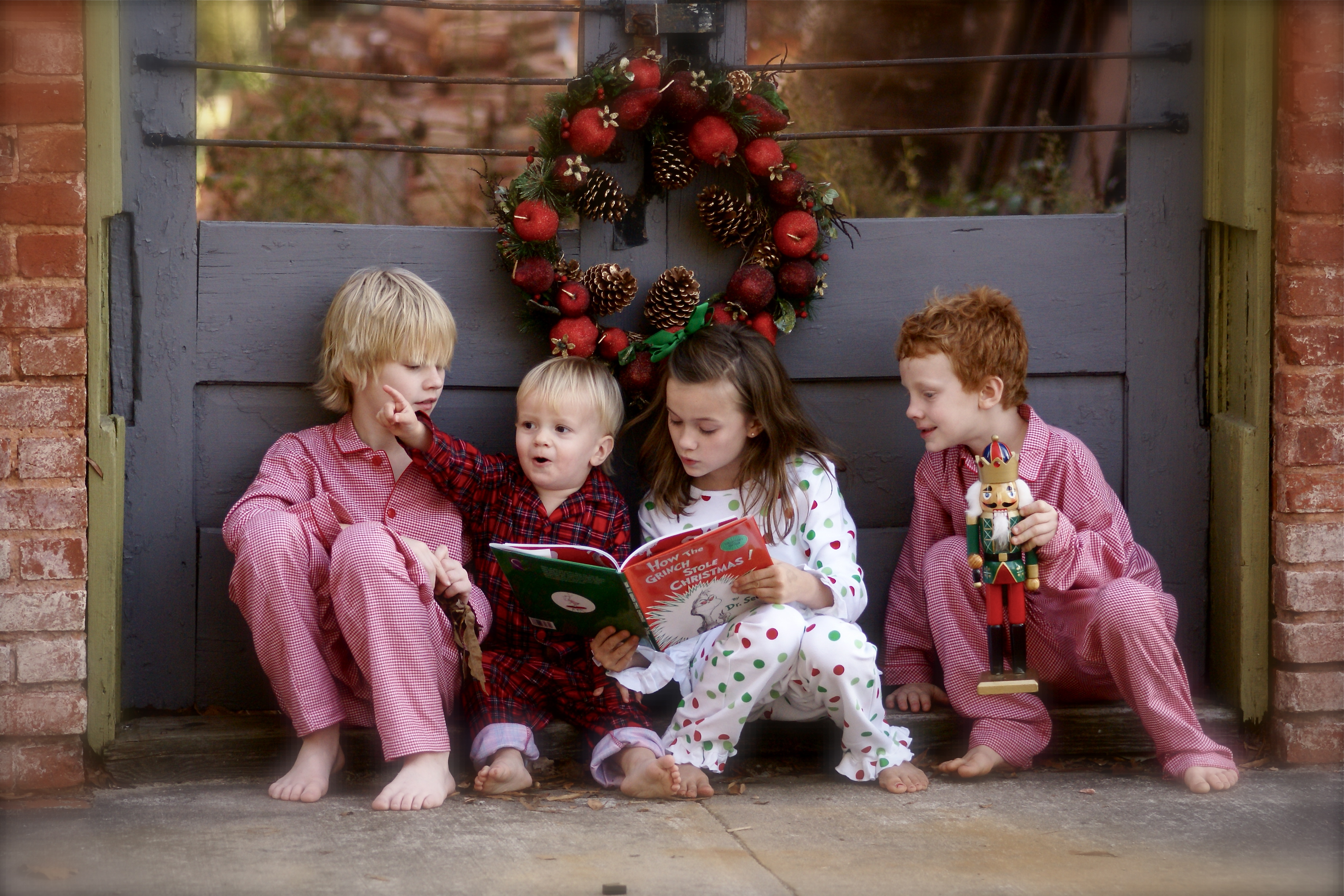
Children reading The Grinch

== History ==
The teaching of reading and writing has varied over the years from spelling and phonetic methods to the fashions for look-say and whole language methods. In America in the eighteenth century, Noah Webster introduced spelling approaches with syllabaries, and in England the use of James Pitman's Initial Teaching Alphabet was popular in the 1960s.

=== Australia ===
In December 2005, the Department of Education, Science, and Training of the Australian Government published a report entitled A National Inquiry into the Teaching of Reading. The report recommends direct and systematic instruction in phonics as the foundation of early reading instruction. It is not clear if all of the findings of the report are reflected in the Australian Curriculum. The report was critiqued by Phillip Cormack, University of South Australia, who states that the key to success in a reading lesson is the relationship between the teacher, the child and the material to be read.

Some of the findings of the report are:

- Among the successful schools visited, there were a number of key similarities. Three of those similarities are:

1. a belief that each child can learn to read and write regardless of background;
2. an early, systematic, and "explicit" (i.e. specific and clear) teaching of phonics;
3. the phonics instruction was followed by "direct teaching".

- Students learn best from an approach that includes phonemic awareness, phonics, fluency, vocabulary knowledge and comprehension. (Executive Summary)
- A whole-language approach, "on its own, is not in the best interests of children, particularly those experiencing reading difficulties". (Pg. 12)
- Where there is unsystematic or no phonics instruction, children do not perform as well in such areas as reading accuracy, fluency, writing, spelling and comprehension. (Pg. 12)
- A recommendation that teachers provide "systematic, direct and explicit phonics instruction". (Pg. 14)

Dr. Jennifer Buckingham published a research brief in June 2018 explaining Systematic Synthetic Phonics and the evidence supporting it.

As of October 5, 2018, The State Government of Victoria, Australia, publishes a website containing a comprehensive Literacy Teaching Toolkit including Effective Reading Instruction, Phonics, and Sample Phonics Lessons. It contains elements of synthetic phonics, analytic phonics, and analogy phonics.

=== Canada ===
In Canada, public education is the responsibility of the Provincial and Territorial governments. There is no evidence that systematic phonics (including synthetic phonics) has been specifically adopted by any of these jurisdictions.

On the one hand, the curriculum of all of the Canadian provinces include some of the following: phonics, phonological awareness, segmenting and blending, decoding, phonemic awareness, graphophonic cues, and letter-sound relationships. (Note: Sources:)

On the other hand, some of the practices of whole language are evident, such as: "use language prediction skills to identify unknown words"; "using three cueing systems: meaning, structure, and visual"; "reading on, omitting words, rereading and making substitutions"; "predict on the basis of what makes sense"; and "a wide variety of sight words".

Yet, systematic phonics and synthetic phonics received attention in the following publications:

- In 2005 the Ministry of Education for the government of Ontario published a report entitled Early Reading Strategy: The Report of the Expert Panel on Early Reading in Ontario and Early Math Strategy. The report states "This Expert Panel supports the position of the National Reading Panel (2000) that phonics instruction should be integrated into a comprehensive and balanced reading program. Instruction in phonics and decoding should not be conceived of as a total reading program, but neither should it be neglected." Pg 104
- The Canadian Language and Literacy Research Network published a report entitled Foundations for Literacy: An evidence-based Toolkit for the Effective Reading and Writing Teacher. It is a practical toolkit helping teachers to a) understand research in order to keep informed, b) understand how children develop reading and writing skills, and c) understand how to use effective instruction techniques. It also includes explanations of phonological awareness, phonemic awareness, the alphabetic principle (including systematic phonics and synthetic phonics instruction).
- In 2009, the Ministry of Education for the province of British Columbia posted a discussion paper on their Read Now website entitled Reading: Breaking Through the Barriers. The paper states that explicit and synthetic phonics needs to be taught directly in the classroom because it works "for all students but are particularly helpful for students at risk for reading difficulty". (Pg. 8) There appears to be no evidence, however, that systematic phonics (or synthetic phonics) is a part of the teaching pedagogy.
- In 2010, The Literacy and Numeracy Secretariat of Ontario, Canada, published a report entitled Capacity Building Series: Reading Fluency that offers practical strategies to teach reading comprehension. This includes Automaticity (the ability to automatically decode words), Phrasing (reading phrases not only words), and Expression (moving from a monotone delivery to a natural rise and fall in pitch, tone and rhythm). In the section about decoding it discusses the importance of Phonological Awareness (hearing words in sentences and individual sounds in words), Alphabetic Letter Knowledge (identifying, naming and writing letters), and the Alphabetic Principle (understanding that letters represent the sounds of spoke language). In the latter, in addition to other suggestions, it is emphasized that teaching should include instruction in segmenting and blending alongside the explicit teaching of letter sounds.
- Dr. Robert Savage, formerly of McGill University and now at UCL Institute of Education, University College London, concludes that, with respect to remedial programs, we should not wait for children to fail before using phonics programs. He also recommends the teaching of such skills as segmenting and blending alongside the "explicit teaching" of letter sounds. He also says there is a need for more randomized controlled trials in order to produce more definitive conclusions. In another report about effective early reading instruction and inclusion, Savage states that "a heavy and early structured approach to early reading intervention focused on mastering the use of the alphabetic principle to decode as a self-teaching mechanism is enough to allow many children to take off into reading without further focused support beyond good regular classroom teaching".
- In 2011, Dr. Janette Pelletier, OISE, University of Toronto published a paper entitled Supporting Early Language and Literacy that outlines several key findings from early literacy research, including the importance of teaching phonological awareness and the "knowledge of letter names and letter-sound correspondences" also known as decoding.

In 2021, the province of New Brunswick introduced a new English Language Arts curriculum that includes phonological awareness, phonics, fluency, vocabulary and reading comprehension. Notably, the teaching of alphabetic skills based on the science of reading has replaced the use of various cueing systems and a variety of strategies to construct meaning from text. It is not yet clear whether the teaching practices will lean towards synthetic phonics, or analytic phonics, or a combination of the two.

On January 27, 2022, the Ontario Human Rights Commission (OHRC) released a report on its public inquiry into the right to read. The OHRC's report deals with all students, not just those with learning disabilities. The inquiry found that Ontario is not fulfilling its obligations to meet students' right to read. The Minister of Education for Ontario responded to this report by saying the government is taking immediate action to improve student literacy and making longer-term reforms to modernize the way reading is taught and assessed in schools, with a focus on phonics. Their plan includes "revising the elementary Language curriculum and the Grade 9 English course with scientific, evidence-based approaches that emphasize direct, explicit and systematic instruction and removing references to unscientific discovery and inquiry-based learning, including the three-cueing system, by 2023." It remains to be seen whether Ontario's curriculum will lean towards synthetic phonics, analytic phonics, or a combination of both.

=== United Kingdom ===
A review of the teaching of early reading was undertaken by Sir Jim Rose at the request of the Department for Education. While the report often uses the term "Systematic Phonic work", it appears to support "Synthetic Phonics" as evidenced in the Rose Review in 2006. In fact, the Department of Education, England uses the term "systematic synthetic phonics". The following is a summary of the report's observations and recommendations concerning phonics:

1. The skills of speaking, listening, reading and writing are used by (and are supported by) what it refers to as "high quality, systematic phonics".
2. Young children should receive sufficient pre-reading instruction so they are able to start systematic phonics work "by the age of five".
3. High quality phonics work should be taught as "the prime approach" to teaching reading, writing, and spelling.
4. Phonics instruction should form a part of "a broad and rich language curriculum". Note: critics of this report point out that the report does not explain what they mean by this, nor does it offer any details on how to achieve this within the framework of synthetic phonics' instruction.

==== Critics of the report ====
- In a report dated April 2007, professors Dominic Wyse and Morag Styles conclude that the evidence "supports" systematic phonics; however, the Rose Report's assertion that synthetic phonics should be the "preferred method" is "not supported by research evidence". This criticism is based on the way the research was conducted and how the results were interpreted.
- In October 2011, The National Campaign for Real Nursery Education web site (U.K.) comments on the U.K. government's intent to impose a specific type of phonics teaching (i.e. systematic, synthetic phonics) in the nursery and reception years, and suggests that this decision was not supported by the "research evidence".

==== Developments following the Rose Report ====
- Following the adoption of the phonics approach in its schools, the Department of Education, England provided a great deal of online support for teachers wishing to learn more about effective phonics teaching strategies. In 2010, the U.K. Office for Standards in Education (Ofsted) released a report entitled Reading by Six - How the best schools do it. It reported that twelve successful schools employed common methods of teaching reading using systematic phonics with features such as; having a clearly defined and incremental approach to the correspondence between the letters and the sounds; applying the blending of the sounds all through the word; and segmenting the phonemes (sounds) to spell the words.
- In March 2011 the Department of Education, England released its White paper entitled "The Importance of Teaching". In the Executive Summary, item 12 of the curriculum section states their commitment to support "systematic synthetic phonics, as the best method for teaching reading."
- As of 2013, all (local-authority-maintained) primary schools in England have a statutory requirement to teach synthetic phonics in years one and two. In addition, any pupil who is struggling to decode words properly by year three must "urgently" receive help through a "rigorous and systematic phonics programme".
- In 2014 Ofsted updated their guidance for school inspectors to include practical tips on how schools should teach reading with systematic phonics, including "Getting them Reading Early". It describes "The simple view of reading" as the word recognition processes (recognizing the words on the page, free of context and using phonics) and the language recognition processes (understanding the meaning of the language). It also includes some videos to illustrate its principles.
- The Progress in International Reading Literacy Study (PIRLS 2016) report was released in December 2017. It reports on the reading abilities of students aged 9 and 10 in 50 countries, and shows that England has risen to Joint 8th place in 2016; its best since 2001. This confirms "that our approach is working", according to Minister Nick Gibb. PIRLS 2016 has a summary of England's Language/Reading Curriculum in the Fourth Grade that shows the increased emphasis on "phonic knowledge and skills as the route to decode words until automatic decoding has become embedded and reading is fluent".
- In 2016 the London School of Economics published a paper that supports the teaching of synthetic phonics to disadvantaged children because it helps to close the literacy gap.
- Some critics continue to raise concerns about how Systematic Synthetic Phonics is being taught and assessed, and whether it puts too much emphasis on decoding at the expense of other factors such as vocabulary and "learning to read".
- In 2018, Ofsted, as part of its curriculum research has produced a YouTube video on Early Reading. It states "It is absolutely essential that every child master the phonic code as quickly as possible ... So, successful schools firstly teach phonics first, fast and furious." Ofsted pledged that their inspections would focus more on what is taught and how it is taught, and less on the test data from September, 2019 onwards.
- While there has been concern expressed about the phonics screening test at the end of year one, some report that phonics is especially valuable for poor readers and those without English as a first language. In January 2019 Ofsted published a report entitled Education inspection framework: overview of research that further supports systematic synthetic phonics together with phonemic awareness, fluency, vocabulary and comprehension.
- In January 2022, a report from University College London said that the current emphasis in English schools on synthetics phonics is not underpinned by the evidence. It says their analyses of the PISA data suggest that teaching reading in England has been less successful since the introduction of more emphasis on synthetic phonics, "although the correlations reported here require further research". In addition, statisticians from several universities question the validity of the PISA results. The report also says "although there remains no doubt that phonics teaching in general is one important component in the teaching of reading, the research certainly does not suggest the complete exclusion of whole language teaching". It recommends that the national curriculum policy be changed and that the focus of political control over curriculum, pedagogy and assessment should be reevaluated. The researchers were among 250 signatories to a letter to the education secretary calling on the government to allow for a wider range of approaches to teaching reading. A Department for Education spokesperson said "Since the introduction of the phonics screening check in 2012, the percentage of Year 1 pupils meeting the expected standard in reading has risen from 58% to 82%, with 92% of children achieving this standard by Year 2".
- On October 4, 2024, the Department of Education provided some guidance on choosing a phonics teaching programme. It provides a list of programmes that meet its criteria but does not require schools to use one of them. It only suggests that any programme chosen is "rigorous, systematic, used with fidelity", and achieves strong outcomes for all students, including the most disadvantaged. The site also lists the 16 Essential Core Criteria of a SSP Programme.

==== Scotland ====
Education Scotland found that explicit, systematic phonics programmes, usually embedded in a rich literacy environment, give an additional four months progress over other programmes such as whole language, and are particularly beneficial for young learners (aged 4–7). There is evidence, though less secure, that synthetic phonics programmes may be more beneficial than analytic phonics programmes; however it is more important to systematically teach to the children's needs.

Synthetic phonics in Scotland has its roots in the Clackmannanshire Report, a seven-year study that was published in 2005. It compared analytic Phonics with synthetic Phonics and advantaged students with disadvantaged children. The report concluded that "the synthetic phonics programme led to children from lower socio-economic backgrounds performing at the same level as children from advantaged backgrounds for most of their time in primary school. It also led to boys performing better than or as well as girls."

Critics of the report claim that the results were exaggerated and due to more than just synthetic phonics.

A five-year follow-up of the study concluded that the beneficial effects were long-lasting, in fact the reading gains increased.

=== United States ===
The United States has a long history of debate concerning the various methods used to teach reading, including phonics. In 1999, The National Institute of Child Health and Human Development (NICHD) appears to conclude that systematic phonics programs are "significantly more effective" than non-phonics programs. It also concludes that they found no significant difference between the different phonics approaches, while suggesting that more evidence may be required.

The NICHD has come out in support of phonics instruction. The institute conducts and supports research on all stages of human development. The institute conducted a meta-analysis and, in 2000 it published a report entitled Report of the National Reading Panel: Teaching Children to Read. Some findings and determinations of this report are:

- Teaching phonemic awareness (PA) to children was "highly effective" with a variety of children under a variety of conditions. (Note: Phonemic Awareness is the ability to manipulate sounds (phonemes) in spoken syllables and words. Phonemes are the smallest units of sounds comprising spoken language. For example, the words go and she each consist of two sounds or phonemes, g-o (IPA /ɡ, oʊ/) and sh-e (IPA /ʃ, iː/), respectively.
- Reading instruction that taught PA improved the children's reading ability significantly more than those that lacked this instruction.
- PA helped normally achieving children to spell but was not effective in helping disabled readers to spell better.
- "Systematic synthetic phonics" instruction had a positive and significant effect on helping disabled readers, low achieving students, and students with low socioeconomic status to read words more effectively than instruction methods that lacked this approach.
- Systematic Phonics instruction improved the ability of good readers to spell. Poor readers experienced a small improvement in spelling.

Other findings of this report are:

- Guided Oral Reading (reading out loud and receiving systematic and explicit feedback from a teacher) "had a significant and positive impact on word recognition, fluency, and comprehension".
- The value of Independent Silent Reading is unclear; however it is clear that it should not be the only type of reading instruction to develop fluency and other reading skills.
- Vocabulary, both oral and print, should be taught directly and indirectly because it leads to gains in comprehension.
- Teaching a combination of reading comprehension techniques is the most effective, however more research is needed to determine which techniques are the most effective.

In 2014 the California Department of Education stated "Ensuring that children know how to decode regularly spelled one-syllable words by mid-first grade is crucial". It goes on to say that "Children need to be phonemically aware (especially able to segment and blend phonemes)". The skills of segmenting and blending phonemes are a central aspect of synthetic phonics. In grades two and three children receive explicit instruction in advanced phonic-analysis and reading multi-syllabic and more complex words.

In 2015 the New York State Public School system began a process to revise its English Language Arts Learning Standards. The standards were revised in 2017 and call for teaching involving "reading or literacy experiences" as well as phonemic awareness from prekindergarten to grade 1 and phonics, word recognition, and word analysis skills in decoding words from grade 1 to grade 4. They will become effective at the beginning of the 2020–2021 school year.

In 2015 the Ohio Legislature set minimum standards requiring the use of phonics as a technique in teaching reading. It includes guidelines for teaching phonemic awareness, phonics, fluency, vocabulary and comprehension. The Ohio Department of Education has created a guidance manual for the year 2018–2019 that outlines the requirements for Researched-Based Reading Instruction. By 2019 the new curricula appears to be paying off. Edweek.org reported that one elementary school in Ohio found that "3rd grade test scores went from the worst in the district—44 percent proficient in 2016—to the best, 71 percent in 2019." They also say "Third grade reading proficiency districtwide moved from 53 percent in 2016 to 64 percent in 2019".

In 2016 the What Works Clearinghouse and the Institute of Education Sciences, an independent and non-partisan arm of the U.S. Department of Education, published an Educator's Practice Guide (with evidence) on Foundational Skills to Support Reading for Understanding in Kindergarten Through 3rd Grade. It contains four recommendations to support reading: 1) Teach students academic language skills, including the use of inferential and narrative language, and vocabulary knowledge, 2) Develop awareness of the segments of sounds in speech and how they link to letters (phonemic awareness and phonics), 3) Teach students to decode words, analyze word parts, and write and recognize words (phonics and synthetic phonics), and 4) Ensure that each student reads connected text every day to support reading accuracy, fluency, and comprehension. Some universities have created additional material based on this guide

In 2018 The Association for Psychological Science published an article entitled Ending the Reading Wars: Reading Acquisition From Novice to Expert. The purpose of the article is to fill the gap between the current research knowledge and the public understanding about how we learn to read, and to explain "why phonics instruction is so central to learning in a writing system such as English". It points out that if reading instruction relied only on the association between the printed word and meaning (as in Whole Language) it would require the memorization of thousands of individual words. Thus, "systematic phonics instruction should be viewed as a natural and logical consequence of the manner in which alphabetic writing systems represent spoken language". There is, however, still a debate as to which systematic phonics method is most effective, synthetic or analytic. The article also explains that despite the weight of evidence supporting systematic phonics, it has only been fully implemented in England. The United States does have Common Core State Standards Initiative that include recommendations for Print Concepts, Phonological Awareness, Phonics, and Fluency; however not all states have adopted these standards.

In 2018 the Arkansas Department of Education, Literacy Support Unit, published a report about their new initiative known as R.I.S.E., Reading Initiative for Student Excellence, that was the result of The Right to Read Act, passed in 2017. This was inspired because, as of 2015, less than half of their students were reading at grade level, placing them in the bottom third of States in relation to national reading assessments. The first goal of this initiative is to provide educators with the in-depth knowledge and skills of "the science of reading" and evidence-based instructional strategies. This includes a change of focus to research-based instruction on phonological awareness, phonics, vocabulary, fluency, and comprehension. Specific requirements are that reading instruction be systematic and explicit, and include decoding techniques. Part of the instruction involves the use of a book and study guide entitled Essentials of Assessing, Preventing and Overcoming Reading Difficulties, by David Kilpatrick.

In 2019 the International Literacy Association released a report entitled Meeting the Challenges of Early Literacy Phonics Instruction The report clearly supports the use of phonics instruction that is explicit and systematic, stating that "phonics instruction is helpful for all students, harmful for none, and crucial for some". It also offers an opinion on the ten most common causes of Phonics Instructional Failure, namely: inadequate time devoted to mastering a new phonics skill such as blending (4–6 weeks recommended); lack of application to real reading instruction; inappropriate reading material to practice the skills; too much teacher instruction, and too little reading by the student; lost time during instructional transitions; the teacher's attitude and knowledge of phonics instructional material; lessons that are not fast-paced and rigorous; lack of assessments over an extended period of time; waiting too long to transition to multi-syllable words; and over emphasis of phonics drills at the expense of other aspects such as vocabulary.

== See also ==
- Alphabetic principle
- American English
- Auditory processing disorder
- British English
- Reading
- Reading for special needs

Note: This article uses British Received Pronunciation.
