= Deep dyslexia =

Neurological disorder

Deep dyslexia is a form of dyslexia that disrupts reading processes. Deep dyslexia may occur as a result of a head injury, stroke, disease, or operation. This injury results in the occurrence of semantic errors during reading and the impairment of nonword reading.

The term dyslexia comes from the Greek words 'dys' meaning 'impaired', and 'lexis' meaning 'word' and is used to describe disorders of language concerning reading and spelling.

Numerous models and hypotheses have been proposed in attempt to explain the broad range of symptoms experienced by deep dyslexics, but a definite consensus has yet to be reached. The proposed models and hypotheses have helped in treatment of some patients, but only with certain specific symptoms. Additionally, the recovery seen is not experienced equally in all patients.

== Signs and symptoms ==
Deep dyslexia is mainly characterized by the occurrence of semantic reading errors or semantic paralexias (transposition of letters or words) when reading aloud (e.g. the written word "view" is read aloud as "scene", the word "bird" is read as "canary"). These semantic errors are the major distinguishing feature of deep dyslexia in comparison to other central dyslexias. There are many other symptoms of deep dyslexia, including visual errors (e.g. the written word "thing" is read aloud as "think", the word "skate" is read as "scale") and derivational errors (e.g. the written word "alcohol" is read aloud as "alcoholic", the word "governor" is read as "government"), and poor reading of function words. Additionally, deep dyslexics have more difficulty reading abstract than concrete and highly imaginable words, more difficulty reading adjectives, adverbs, and verbs than nouns, a complete inability to read non-words, and often impairments on tasks of verbal working memory.

While the symptoms of deep dyslexia listed above are different and independent impairments of reading, it is rare to find an individual who only displays some of the characteristics of it; indeed, most patients presenting with semantic paralexias, a hallmark symptom of the disorder, also demonstrate all of the other symptoms. This has resulted in deep dyslexia being considered a symptom-complex and has led to much research into why this variety of symptoms may co-occur in so many patients.

=== Imageability effect and ease of predication ===
The difficulty of deep dyslexics in reading abstract words has been referred to as the "imageability effect". According to this idea, the ease with which a mental image can be created for a word is strongly related to the ease of reading the word. In an attempt to explain this relationship, researchers have developed a variable to link the mental imagery created by a word and the ease of reading it. This variable, ease of predication, is a rating of how easy it is to come up with simple factual statements or attributes of a word. For example, when presented with the word "dog", an individual may come up with statements, or predicates, such as "has four legs", "is an animal", or "barks and wags its tail". Words with higher ease of predication scores are more easily read aloud by deep dyslexics than words with lower ease of predication scores, yet there is no correlation between ease of predication and ease of reading seen in normal adult readers. Ease of predication may not explain specific symptoms of deep dyslexia, but rather indicates that deep dyslexics read using imagery, or a predicational route, rather than the more precise mechanisms used in normal reading.

== Mechanism ==
There are many different, and often conflicting, hypotheses that attempt to explain the deficits associated with deep dyslexia. These theories have resulted in several models designed to conceptualize the symptom-complex found in deep dyslexics. These models are not ordered chronologically, but rather follow a general increasing trend of presence in the field of knowledge regarding deep dyslexics. Some models may be stronger than others, but that is not necessarily reflected here. Models and hypothesis toward the end of the list are more heavily debated and thus typically have a greater wealth of knowledge surrounding their topic.

=== Continuum model ===
The "Glosser and Friedman (continuum) model" is based upon the concept that deep dyslexia and phonological dyslexia are opposite endpoints on a "continuum" of reading disability. Deep dyslexia appears to be a more severe form of phonological dyslexia; however, symptoms in patients can change over time so that an initial diagnosis of deep dyslexia is later better described as strictly a phonological dyslexia. These observations suggest recovery is possible along the semantic pathway.

Friedman justifies the continuum hypothesis with two sets of evidence. The first involves five patients who started with deep dyslexia, but whose disorders shifted to phonological dyslexia during recovery. Semantic paralexias were the first symptom to diminish, either partially or totally, in each case and then other symptoms were resolved to varying degrees after that. However, nonword reading was always the last symptom to go and complete recovery was never reached by any patient.

Her second set of evidence in support of the continuum was found in her review of eleven patients with deep or phonological dyslexia in whom she found a predictable succession of symptoms. She placed great emphasis on the order in which reading symptoms emerged (poor nonword reading first, then visual errors, then noun > functor, then noun > verb, concrete > abstract, and finally, semantic errors) and suggested that the continuum hypothesis was supported by this pattern of symptoms.

=== Connectionist model ===
Deep dyslexics have sufficient activation of a written word's features; however, this activation decays quickly, leading to errors in speech output.

The "connectionist model" suggests that the phonological and semantic features of a word are activated, but this activation decays at a rate too quick for cognitive processing- thus, errors in speech output are produced as a result of this fading activation. This hypothesis explains the broad symptom-complex of deep dyslexics without resorting to a multiple loci damage approach as seen in other models. It eliminates the need to attribute a specific locus of damage to each symptom of deep dyslexia, and instead states that all symptoms are due to decay of a large activation area.

=== Distributed attractor networks ===
Plaut and Shallice have hypothesized that units in the brain interact in such a way that semantic features form stable attractors in the space of all possible representations of words. These unit interactions correspond to particular attractor patterns, and if the particular attractor pattern is activated, the network remains in that pattern. However, they hypothesize that when the pattern is distorted, there is a pull on the pattern, and it gravitates toward the correct pattern, almost as if this semantic space is filled with basins, where if one point on the pattern falls to the edge of the basin, it will still gravitate toward the middle. If you lesion this area, the neurons die and the basins change their shape. When this happens, you may now have the same distorted starting pattern that will end up in a neighboring basin, which is a semantically related area, but not the correct one, and this would account for deep dyslexic patients to incorrectly identify "river" as "ocean". Lesions that occur early in the network change the basins that send different semantic words to different areas of the network, whereas if they occur later, the words will be much closer semantically. This may account for severity of the deficit in individual patients.

=== Failure of inhibition hypothesis ===
The "failure of inhibition hypothesis" states that the presentation of a target word activates semantic memory of that word, along with memory for other words that are semantically related. For example, the target word "dog" may activate "bark", "cat", "squirrel", "ball", "fetch". Deep dyslexic patients are unable to inhibit the other related words, so they are likely to substitute one of these words for the target word in speech production (explicit output).

Researchers believe that "failure of inhibition" has no effect on implicit processing, but instead is the cause of impairments in the explicit task of speech production. They believe that explicit characteristics of reading involve only the conscious production of speech (reading). Information about written words is internalized without awareness (implicitly); the ability to access this information and process it into words that can be read or spoken is an explicit process. Implicit knowledge involves phonological awareness, understanding of the morphology, and a semantic understanding of written words. This implicit aspect of reading may be completely intact, and yet reading errors can still occur through defects in explicit output, or production. Researchers have studied the dissociation of implicit and explicit processes to thus unravel the underlying deficiencies in deep dyslexia. Studies in support of "failure of inhibition" show intact implicit processing of deep dyslexics. For instance, studies have shown deep dyslexics that are equally fast in a lexical decision task with a rhyming pair of words (book-took) in comparison to a non-rhyming pair of words (bough-tough), indicating that the patients are able to use implicit phonological knowledge and phonics to process the words. Additionally, they are faster in a lexical decision task with words that sound like they are spelled (couch, pouch) than they are with words that do not sound like they are spelled (touch), again showing that patients are using phonology. These data show that implicit processing is in fact occurring in deep dyslexic patients. Thus, some researchers believe that the impairments present in deep dyslexics are only in explicit phonological output (i.e., reading aloud). They believe that the problems of deep dyslexics are due to production errors, and that deep dyslexics have normal phonological processing at the implicit level. This is supported by the fact that deep dyslexia is often present in patients with production errors resulting from Expressive aphasia.

Riley and Thompson expanded on this theory in 2010. Previous studies had shown that typical in patients with deep dyslexia, typical members of a semantic category (like "robin" in the category of "birds") are processed faster than atypical members of the same category (like "ostrich"), known as the semantic typicality effect. According to their research, this typicality effect may indicate an inability to efficiently select a correct lexical-semantic representation. They suggest that selection inhibition becomes impaired beginning at the level of semantics rather than the later levels of production like the original failure of inhibition hypothesis suggests.

=== Dual route model ===
Deep dyslexia can affect both pathways in the dual-route hypothesis of reading.

The "Morton and Patterson (dual route) model" is based upon the dual route hypothesis of reading. It proposes that the occurrence of semantic errors alongside an inability to read non-words aloud must be due to multiple loci of damage within this dual-route model. Because a deep dyslexic cannot read aloud non-words, a disruption in the phonological process is assumed, forcing reading to proceed through the semantic route. However, deep dyslexics also produce semantic errors while reading, alluding to damage in this pathway as well. Other researchers refer to the phonological and semantic route as "modules". They believe that patients have a partially functioning lexical module and a completely deficient nonlexical module. The lexical module is analogous to the semantic route in the dual route model and relies on lexical memory, or the memory for words, to name words. In using the lexical module, an individual accesses a "mental dictionary" of words. The nonlexical module is comparable to the phonological route and uses knowledge of spelling and graphemes to create phonemes to name words and nonwords. The absent nonlexical module in deep dyslexics explains why patients cannot name nonwords.

=== Right and left hemisphere hypotheses ===
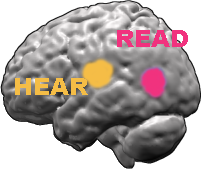
Activation areas in the left hemisphere when hearing or reading a word. The "left-hemisphere hypothesis", supports the idea of a damaged left hemisphere-based reading system.

Normal reading is typically a function of a left hemisphere-based system. The right hemisphere plays a minimal role in reading. One hypothesis, the "left hemisphere hypothesis", supports the idea of a damaged left hemisphere-based reading system associated with deep dyslexia. Deep dyslexics may be attempting to use this damaged left hemisphere, resulting in severe reading deficits. On the other hand, the "right hemisphere hypothesis" states that deep dyslexics attempt to read using a completely different reading system. According to this hypothesis, they are using the right hemisphere for orthographic and semantic processing, but given that this system does not usually play a role in reading, deep dyslexics have many reading disabilities. Strong support for this hypothesis comes from studies of split-brain patients who use the right hemisphere for reading. These patients makes semantic errors similar to those seen with deep dyslexia. Numerous studies have shown that the right hemisphere can contribute to reading when a patient's left hemisphere is damaged. Brain imaging studies, performed both on deep dyslexics and in other patients with left hemisphere injury, have shown that the damaged left hemisphere is still playing a role in reading. However, the imaging has also shown that areas of the right hemisphere are also active during reading. Thus, it currently appears that there is greater support in favor of the right-hemisphere hypothesis.

== Diagnosis ==
=== Classification ===
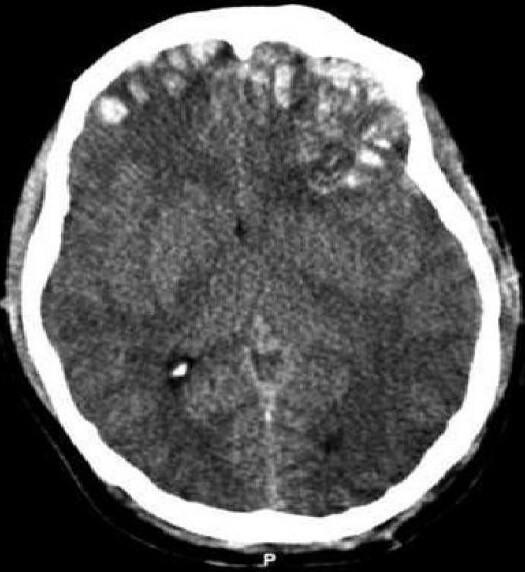
Computerized tomography (CT) scan showing brain multiple frontal, parietal, and temporal lobe lesions. The cause of deep dyslexia is damage in the left hemisphere of the brain.

Deep dyslexia is usually classified as an acquired reading disorder, as opposed to a developmental dyslexia, in previously literate adults as a consequence of a brain injury. However, recently, developmental deep dyslexia has also been reported in children with Williams syndrome.

Deep dyslexia is considered to be a "central dyslexia" as compared to a "peripheral dyslexia". Peripheral dyslexics have difficulty matching the visual characteristics of letters that comprise a word to a stored memory of this word from prior encounters. Central dyslexics are unable to properly match the visual word to the word's meaning. They may also be incapable of speaking, or phonating, the sequence of written letters that they see into the word these letters represent. Deep dyslexia differs from other forms of central dyslexia (phonological dyslexia and surface dyslexia) in that deep dyslexics have many more symptoms and these symptoms are generally more severe. According to the "continuum" hypothesis, deep dyslexia is a more severe form of phonological dyslexia.

== Treatment ==
There have been many different studies done in an attempt to treat deep dyslexics, all which have been met with varying success. One method that has been frequently used is to teach patients to sound out words using grapheme-to-phoneme correspondence rules (for example, using single letter graphemes such as the letter 'B" to link with larger words such as "Baby", allowing for association of phonemes). Such methods are known as "non-lexically based reading treatments". Other studies have looked at attempting to repair the semantic-lexical route, known as "lexically based treatment".
