= Phonological dyslexia =

Phonological dyslexia is a reading disability that is a form of alexia (acquired dyslexia), resulting from brain injury, stroke, or progressive illness and that affects previously acquired reading abilities. The major distinguishing symptom of acquired phonological dyslexia is that a selective impairment of the ability to read pronounceable non-words occurs although the ability to read familiar words is not affected. It has also been found that the ability to read non-words can be improved if the non-words belong to a family of pseudohomophones.

== Deep and phonological dyslexia ==
Individuals with phonological dyslexia have the opposite problem to surface dyslexics. These individuals are able to read using the whole word method. However, they struggle when it comes to sounding words out. Phonological dyslexics are able to read familiar words, but have difficulties when it comes to unfamiliar words or non-words that are pronounceable. Several studies have found that many phonological dyslexics have a good reading ability if the individual has developed a large vocabulary prior to having brain damage. These individuals seem to stop developing their vocabulary post-brain damage, which affects their reading capacity.

Phonological dyslexia is a reading disorder in which the patient has impaired reading of nonwords. The symptoms of phonological dyslexia are very similar to those of deep dyslexia. The major difference between these two dyslexias is that phonological dyslexics do not make semantic errors associated with deep dyslexia. Beauvois and Dérouesné (1979) studied the first case of phonological dyslexia and came up with this term. The problem people with phonological dyslexia have is that they are able to read words using the whole word method; however, they are not able to sound words out. This means that they are able to read familiar words, but have difficulties reading new words.

Initially it was believed that the factor causing phonological dyslexia was lexicality; however, other factors such as imageability and concreteness also play a critical role in reading. A study done by Crisp and Lambon Ralph concluded that imageability has a significant effect on phonological dyslexia. The study found that eleven out of the twelve patients had more accuracy when reading words with high imageability. In that study, the patient who was the exception was the least severely damaged, contributing to a view of phonological dyslexia and deep dyslexia as points on a continuum rather than discrete disorders.

== Physiology ==
Several studies have found that different levels of brain damage can lead to the occurrence of varying forms of non-word reading disorders. It has been found that during certain tasks, dyslexics had activated one of two regions of the brain: the Broca's area, which is responsible for speech, or the Wernicke's area, which is responsible for forming and understanding. Both areas were seldom active together. This study has led to the conclusion that there exist neural connection breakdowns between the language centers that may be causing dyslexia.

== Hyphenation ==
An investigation conducted by Harley, T. A., and O'Mara, D.A. (2006) found that hyphenation significantly improved a participant's reading ability. The subject had phonological dyslexia that was due to a deficiency in graphemic parsing. The study suggested that hyphenation might be generally useful as a strategy to assist phonological dyslexics.

== Case study ==
A study was done by Beauvois and Dérouesné on a 64-year-old man. The individual is described as right-handed, a retiree, and having formerly been an agricultural machinery representative. The individual had had surgery for a left parieto-occipital angioma. Scans showed a lesion at the left angular gyrus, the posterior part of the second temporal convolution, the inferior longitudinal fasciculus, the geniculostriate fibres and tapetum. The patient was also found to have neurological defects such as right inferior quadrantanopia, mild memory deficit, mild calculation impairment, minimal constructional apraxia, and astereognosia. It was found that the patient did not have motor or sensory defects. He had been obliged to retire as the phonological dyslexia disrupted his ability to work. He had previously enjoyed reading, but was now unable to read his own or other pieces of writing. The diagnosis was confirmed with the Alouette reading test, which concluded that the patient had a reading disability. He was found to have the reading ability of a 6-year-old child, which is considered to be the lowest reading level. The level of reading was not determined from the speed, rather from the fact that the patient was not able to read more than 62 of the stimuli presented in three minutes, while 40% of the represented stimuli were either read incorrectly or left unread. The reading errors included adjectives, possessive adjectives, conjunctions and verbs.

== The dual route cascaded model ==
Patients with phonological dyslexia have problem reading non-words and unfamiliar words. According to the dual route model, patients with phonological dyslexia use route 2 or 3 that have intact orthographic input lexicon which allow them to pronounce familiar words whether regular or irregular. However, due to phonological dyslexia they are unable to use grapheme-phoneme conversion (Route 1), as route 1 is impaired, thus patients find it difficult to pronounce unfamiliar words and non-words.

== See also ==
- Aphasia
- Agnosia
- Dual-route hypothesis to reading aloud
- Developmental dyslexia
- Surface dyslexia
