= Freda Newcombe =

British neuroscientist and psychologist

- Born: Freda Gladys Newcombe
- Education: University of Manchester (BA); University of Oxford (PhD)
- Scientific career
- Workplaces: University of Oxford; Institute of Psychiatry
- Thesis: Selective intellectual deficit in relation to focal cerebral lesions (1966)
- Doctoral advisor: William Ritchie Russell
- Doctoral students: Dorothy Bishop

Freda Gladys Newcombe (1925–2001) was a British clinical neuropsychologist who played a pivotal role in the development of the discipline of cognitive neuropsychology. She was a fellow of Linacre College, Oxford, from 1968 to 1992, and then Honorary Fellow from 1992. She served as President of the International Neuropsychological Society in 1985 and was made an Honorary Fellow of the British Psychological Society in 1994. She was awarded an honorary degree by the University of Essex in 1995.

== Education ==
Newcombe took a Bachelor of Arts degree with Distinction in Psychology at the University of Manchester in 1946, before going on to post-graduate training in Clinical Psychology at the Institute of Psychiatry, London. She then moved to Greece, where she worked with the International Welfare Organization in Athens, before returning to the UK in 1961. In 1963 she was recruited by Professor William Ritchie Russell at the University of Oxford to study the effects of brain injuries caused by shrapnel wounds in British servicemen during World War II. This study formed the basis of her Doctor of Philosophy thesis, which was awarded in 1966, on "Selective Intellectual Deficit in Relation to Focal Cerebral Lesions."

== Research ==
Newcombe's doctoral studies on ex-servicemen were the basis for her 1969 book Missile Wounds of the Brain: a study of psychological deficits, in which she detailed relationships between cognitive deficits and lesion location. She retained a life-long interest in the group of ex-servicemen whom she studied, extending her studies to consider the impact of brain injury on cognitive aging. Her research was characterized by an interest not just in group data but also in detailed investigation of single cases. One of these, known in the literature as GR, had a surprising problem with reading words, in that he made semantic errors; for instance, when presented with the word 'canary' he would say 'parrot' - a word related in meaning but quite different in pronunciation. This cognitive profile, known as deep dyslexia was to provide a fertile source of data for theories of reading, and led to a long-lasting collaboration with John C. Marshall.

Newcombe's research was funded by the Medical Research Council until her retirement in 1990, when she set up the Russell-Cairns Head Injury Unit with the Radcliffe Infirmary, Oxford, using funds from her medico-legal work. A list of her scientific papers is available on Google Scholar.

== Personal life ==
In 1971 Newcombe married David Ellis, who died in 1981. In 1994 she married Sir Bryan Cartledge, then Principal of Linacre College. She took formal retirement in 1996. Obituaries can be found in Neuropsychologia and The Psychologist.
