= List of Arabic letter components =

Arabic script

This is a list of Arabic letter components used in Arabic script.

== Table of Letter Components ==
A = The letter is used for most languages and dialects with writing systems based on Arabic.

MSA = Letters used in Modern Standard Arabic.

CA = Letters used in Classical Arabic.

AD = Letters used in some regional Arabic Dialects.

"Arabic" = Letters used in Classical Arabic, Modern Standard Arabic, and most regional dialects.

"Farsi" = Letters used in modern Persian.

FW = Foreign words: the letter is sometimes used to spell foreign words.

SV = Stylistic variant: the letter is used interchangeably with at least one other letter depending on the calligraphic style.

AW = Arabic words: the letter is used in additional languages to spell Arabic words.

=== Table ===
==== No additions ====
Letter Line Shapes ^{(ii)}		ء	ا	ے	ى	ں	ٮ	ح	س	ص	ط	ع	ڡ		ٯ	ڪ	ك	ک	گ	ل	م	د	ر	و	ھ	ہ	ه	لا
positional forms	isolated	ء	ا	ے	ى	ں	ٮ	ح	س	ص	ط	ع	ڡ		ٯ	ڪ	ك	ک	گ	ل	م	د	ر	و	ھ	ہ	ه	لا
positional forms	start	ء	ا	^{none}	ىـ	^{(YNB)}	ٮـ	حـ	سـ	صـ	طـ	عـ	ڡـ	^{(QF)}	ٯـ	ڪـ	كـ	کـ	گـ	لـ	مـ	د	ر	و	ھـ	ہـ	هـ	لا
positional forms	middle	ء	ـا	^{none}	ـىـ	^{(YNB)}	ـٮـ	ـحـ	ـسـ	ـصـ	ـطـ	ـعـ	ـڡـ	^{(QF)}	ـٯـ	ـڪـ	ـكـ	ـکـ	ـگـ	ـلـ	ـمـ	ـد	ـر	ـو	ـھـ	ـہـ	ـهـ	ـلا
positional forms	end	ء	ـا	ـے	ـى	ـں	ـٮ	ـح	ـس	ـص	ـط	ـع	ـڡ		ـٯ	ـڪ	ـك	ـک	ـگ	ـل	ـم	ـد	ـر	ـو	ـھ	ـہ	ـه	ـلا
image of forms	isolated start middle end	ء	ا	ے	ى	ں	ٮ	ح	س	ص	ط	ع	ڡ		ٯ	ڪ	ك	ک	گ	ل	م	د	ر	و	ھ	ہ	ه	لا
Unicode for above		U+0621	U+0627	U+06D2	U+0649	U+06BA	U+066E	U+062D	U+0633	U+0635	U+0637	U+0639	U+06A1		U+066F	U+06AA	U+0643	U+06A9	U+06AF	U+0644	U+0645	U+062F	U+0631	U+0648	U+06BE	U+06C1	U+0647	ا + ل
Languages that use the letter shape with or without i'jam		Arabic	Arabic	Urdu	Arabic	Arabic	Arabic	Arabic	Arabic	Arabic	Arabic	Arabic	Arabic		Arabic	Sindhi, Arabic SV	Arabic	Farsi, Urdu, Arabic SV	Farsi, Urdu	Arabic	Arabic	Arabic	Arabic	Arabic	Urdu, Arabic SV	Urdu, Arabic SV	Arabic, Farsi	Arabic
diacritics ^{(i)}	isolated	ء	ا	ے	ى	ں	ٮ	ح	س	ص	ط	ع	ڡ		ٯ	ڪ	ك	ک	گ	ل	م	د	ر	و	ھ	ہ	ه	لا
none	start mid end	ء	ـا ا	ـــے ے	ىـ ـىـ ـى	ـں ں	ٮـ ـٮـ ـٮ	حـ ـحـ ـح	سـ ـسـ ـس	صـ ـصـ ـص	طـ ـطـ ـط	عـ ـعـ ـع	ڡـ ـڡـ ـڡ		ٯـ ـٯـ ـٯ	ڪــ ـڪــ ـڪ	كـ ـكـ ـك	کـ ـکـ ـک	گـ ـگـ ـگ	لـ ـلـ ـل	مـ ـمـ ـم	ـد د	ـر ر	ـو و	ھـ ـھـ ـھ	ہـ ـہـ ـہ	هـ ـهـ ـه	ـلا لا
Languages using the bare shape with no additions		Arabic	Arabic, Farsi, Urdu	Urdu	MSA	Urdu, Arabic SV	Arabic SV Rasm	Arabic, Farsi, Urdu	Arabic, Farsi, Urdu	Arabic, Farsi, Urdu	Arabic, Farsi, Urdu	Arabic, Farsi, Urdu	Arabic SV in Rasm		Arabic SV in Rasm	Sindhi, Arabic SV	Arabic	Farsi, Urdu, Arabic SV	Farsi, Urdu	Arabic, Farsi, Urdu	Arabic, Farsi, Urdu	Arabic, Farsi, Urdu	Arabic, Farsi, Urdu	Arabic, Farsi, Urdu	Urdu, Arabic SV	Urdu, Arabic SV	Arabic, Farsi	MSA
Unicode for above		U+0621	U+0627	U+06D2	U+0649	U+06BA	U+066E	U+062D	U+0633	U+0635	U+0637	U+0639	U+06A1		U+066F	U+06AA	U+0643	U+06A9	U+06AF	U+0644	U+0645	U+062F	U+0631	U+0648	U+06BE	U+06C1	U+0647	ل + ا
Bare line in isolated and end forms only	isolated	ء	ا	ے	ی	ࢽ	ٮ	ح	س	ص	ط	ع	ࢼ		ࢻ	ڪ	ك	ک	گ	ل	م	د	ر	و	ھ	ہ	ه	لا
Bare line in isolated and end forms only	start mid end				یـ ـیـ ـی	ࢽـ ـࢽـ ـࢽ							ࢻـ ـࢻـ ـࢻ		ࢼـ ـࢼـ ـࢼ													
Bare line in isolated and end forms only	image																											
	Languages																											
	Unicode					U+08BD							U+08BB		U+08BC													

==== dots ====
===== 1 dot =====
Diacritics ^{(i)}		Letter Shapes:^{(ii)}	ء	ا	ے	ى	ں	ٮ	ح	س	ص	ط	ع	ڡ	ٯ	ڪ	ك	ک	گ	ل	م	د	ر	و	ھ	ہ	ه	لا
1 dot below	◌࣭ ◌ٜ ــٜـ ﮳	isolated	ء	ا	ے	ى	ں	ب	ج	س	ص	ط	ع	ڡ	ٯ	ڪ	ك	ک	گ	ل	م	د	ر	و	ھ	ہ	ه	لا
1 dot below	◌࣭ ◌ٜ ــٜـ ﮳	connected						بـ ـبـ ـب	جـ ـجـ ـج																			
		image																										
		Languages																										
U+FBB3 U+065C		Unicode						U+0628	U+062C																			
1 dot above + 1 dot below	﮲﮳	isolated	ء	ا	ے	ى	ڹ	ٮ	ح	ښ	ۻ	ط	ۼ	ڣ	ٯ	ڪ	ك	ک	گ	ل	م	د	ږ	و	ھ	ہ	ه	لا
1 dot above + 1 dot below	﮲﮳	connected																										
		image																										
		Languages																										
		Unicode																										
1 dot above	◌࣪ ﮲	isolated	ء	ا	ے	ى	ن	ٮ	خ	س	ض	ظ	غ	ف	ڧ	ڪ	ك	ݢ	گ	ل	ݥ	ذ	ز	ۏ	ھ	ہ	ه	لا
1 dot above	◌࣪ ﮲	connected																										
		image																										
		Languages																Malay						Malay				
U+FBB2		Unicode					U+0646		U+062E		U+0636	U+0638	U+063A	U+0641	U+06A7			U+0762			U+0765	U+0630	U+0632	U+06CF				

===== 2 dots =====
diacritics ^{(i)}		Letter Shapes ^{(ii)}	ء	ا	ے	ى	ں	ٮ	ح	س	ص	ط	ع	ڡ	ٯ	ڪ	ك	ک	گ	ل	م	د	ر	و	ھ	ہ	ه	لا
2 dots below start and mid ^{(iii)}	﮵	isolated form	ء	ا	ے	یـ ـیـ ـی ی			ح	س	ص	ط	ع	ڡ	ٯ	ڪ	ك	ک	گ	ل	م	د	ر	و	ھ	ہ	ه	لا
2 dots below start and mid ^{(iii)}		image																										
	Languages					Farsi, Urdu, AD																						
U+FBB5 U+FBB5		Unicode				U+06CC																						
2 dots below all positions	﮵	isolated form	ء	ا	ے	يـ ـيـ ـي ي			ح	س	ص	ط	ع	ڡ	ٯ	ڪ	ك	ک	گ	ل	م	د	ر	و	ھ	ہ	ه	لا
2 dots below all positions		image																										
	Languages					Arabic ^{(iv)}																						
U+FBB5 U+FBB5		Unicode				U+064A																						
2 vertical dots below	﮾	isolated form	ء	ا	ے	ى	ں	ٮ	ح	س	ص	ط	ع	ڡ	ٯ	ڪ	ك	ک	گ	ل	م	د	ر	و	ھ	ہ	ه	لا
2 vertical dots below		image																										
	Languages																											
U+FBBE		Unicode																										
2 vertical dots above	﮽	isolated form	ء	ا	ے	ى	ں	ٮ	ح	س	ص	ط	ع	ڡ	ٯ	ڪ	ك	ک	گ	ل	م	د	ر	و	ھ	ہ	ه	لا
2 vertical dots above		image																										
	Languages																											
U+FBBD		Unicode																										
2 horizontal dots above	﮴	isolated form	ء	ا	ے	ى	ں	ت	ح	س	ص	ط	ع	ڡ	ق	ڪ	ك	ک	گ	ل	م	د	ر	و	ھ	ـۃ	ـة	لا
2 horizontal dots above		image																										
	Languages																											
FBB4		Unicode						U+062A							U+0642											U+06C3	U+0629	
diacritics ^{(i)}		Letter Shapes ^{(ii)}	ء	ا	ے	ى	ں	ٮ	ح	س	ص	ط	ع	ڡ	ٯ	ڪ	ك	ک	گ	ل	م	د	ر	و	ھ	ہ	ه	لا

﮴	above: 2 dots
﮵	below: 2 dots
﮽	above: 2 dots (vertically)
﮾	below: 2 dots (vertically)

U+08EB (2283)	◌࣫	TWO DOTS ABOVE
U+08EE (2286)	◌࣮	TWO DOTS BELOW

===== 3 dots =====
ث پ چ ژ ش	Arabic & Persian
ݑ ڥ ڤ ڨ ڠ ڟ ڞ ۺ ڜ ڛ څ ڿ ۑ ۋ ڮ ڴ ڷ ڸ	other pointing out
ݤ ڏ ݓ ݒ ݡ ݘ ݞ	inverted

3 dots below (horizontal)	﮳ ﮳ ﮳	isolated form	ء	ا	ے	ى	ں	ݐ	ح	س	ص	ط	ع	ڡ	ٯ	ڪ	ك	ک	گ	ل	م	د	ر	و	ھ	ہ	ه	لا
3 dots below (horizontal)		image																										
		Languages						Fula																				
		Unicode						U+0750																				
3 dots below (inverted)	﮷	isolated form	ء	ا	ے	ى	ں	ٮ	ح	س	ص	ط	ع	ڡ	ٯ	ڪ	ك	ک	گ	ل	م	د	ر	و	ھ	ہ	ه	لا
3 dots below (inverted)		image																										
		Languages																										
U+FBB7		Unicode																										
3 dots below	﮹	isolated form	ء	ا	ے	ۑ	ں	پ	چ	ڛ	ص	ط	ع	ڥ	ٯ	ڪ	ڮ	ؼ	گ	ڸ	م	د	ر	و	ھ	ہ	ه	ڸا
3 dots below		image																										
		Languages																										
U+FBB9		Unicode				U+06D1		U+067E	U+0686	U+069B				U+06A5			U+06AE	U+063C		U+06B8								
3 dots above + 3 dots below	﮹﮶	isolated form	ء	ا	ے	ى	ں	ٮ	ح	ڜ	ص	ط	ع	ڡ	ٯ	ڪ	ك	ک	گ	ل	م	د	ر	و	ھ	ہ	ه	لا
3 dots above + 3 dots below		image																										
		Languages																										
U+FBB6 + U+FBB9		Unicode																										
3 dots above	﮶	isolated form	ء	ا	ے		ڽ	ث	څ	ش	ڞ	ڟ	ڠ	ڤ	ڨ	ڪ	ڭ	ݣ	ڴ	ڷ	م	ڎ	ژ	ۋ	ھ	ہ	ه	ڷا
3 dots above		image																										
		Languages					Malay		Pashto				Malay	Malay						Brahui		Wolof						
U+FBB6		Unicode					U+06BD	U+062B	U+0685	U+0634	U+069E	U+069F	U+06A0	U+06A4	U+06A8		U+06AD	U+0763	U+06B4	U+06B7		U+068E	U+0698	U+06CB				
3 dots above (inverted)	﮸	isolated form	ء	ا	ے	ى	ں	ٮ	ح	س	ص	ط	ݞ	ڡ	ٯ	ڪ	ك	ک	گ	ل	م	ڏ	ر	و	ھ	ہ	ه	لا
3 dots above (inverted)		image																										
U+FBB8		Languages																				Sindhi						
		Unicode																				U+068F						

===== 4 dots =====
4 dots below	﮻	isolated form	ء	ا	ے	ى	ں	ڀ	ڇ	س	ص	ط	ع	ڡ	ٯ	ڪ	ك	ک	گ	ل	م	د	ر	و	ھ	ہ	ه	لا
4 dots below		image																										
		Languages																										
U+FBBB		Unicode																										
4 dots above	﮺	isolated form	ء	ا	ے	ى	ں	ٿ	ح	ݜ	ص	ط	ع	ڦ	ٯ	ڪ	ك	ک	گ	ل	م	ڐ	ڙ	و	ھ	ہ	ه	لا
4 dots above		image																										
		Languages								Shina, Torwali													Sindhi, Shina, Torwali					
U+FBBA		Unicode						U+067F		U+075C												U+0690	U+0699					

===== different dots above and below =====
mixed dots above + below	isolated form	ء	ا	ے	ى	ں	ݓ	ݑ	ڿ	ۺ	ص	ط	ع	ڡ	ٯ	ڪ	ك	ک	گ	ل	م	د	ر	و	ھ	ہ	ه	لا
mixed dots above + below	image																											
	Languages						Hausa	Wolof																				
	Unicode						U+0753	U+0751																				
diacritics ^{(i)}	Letter Shapes ^{(ii)}	ء	ا	ے	ى	ں	ٮ	ٮ	ح	س	ص	ط	ع	ڡ	ٯ	ڪ	ك	ک	گ	ل	م	د	ر	و	ھ	ہ	ه	لا

==== tōē ====
small tōē below	﯁	isolated form	ء	ا	ے	ى	ں	ٮ	ݮ	س	ص	ط	ع	ڡ	ٯ	ڪ	ك	ک	گ	ل	م	د	ر	و	ھ	ہ	ه	لا
small tōē below	connected form(s)								ݮـ ـݮـ ـݮ																			
		image																										
		Unicode							U+076E																			
		Languages							Khowar																			
small tōē above	ـــؕــ ﯀ ◌ؕ	isolated form	ء	ا	ے	ى	ڻ	ٹ	ݲ	س	ص	ط	ع	ڡ	ٯ	ڪ	ك	ک	گ	ࣇ لؕ	م	ڈ	ڑ	و	ھ	ہ	ه	لا
small tōē above	connected form(s)																											
		image																										
Urdu Punjabi Torwali		Languages					Punjabi	Urdu	Torwali											Punjabi		Urdu	Urdu					
U+0615 U+FBC0		Unicode					U+06BB	U+0679	U+0772													U+0688	U+0691					
small tōē + dot(s)		isolated form	ء	ا	ے	ى	ݨ	ٮ	ح	ݰ	ص	ط	ع	ڡ	ٯ	ڪ	ك	ک	گ	ل	م	د	ݱ	و	ھ	ہ	ه	لا
small tōē + dot(s)	connected form(s)																											
		image																										
		Languages					Punjabi, Seraiki, Shina			Torwali													Torwali					
		Unicode																										
diacritics ^{(i)}		Letter Shapes ^{(ii)}	ء	ا	ے	ى	ں	ٮ	ح	س	ص	ط	ع	ڡ	ٯ	ڪ	ك	ک	گ	ل	م	د	ر	و	ھ	ہ	ه	لا

==== ring ====
ring	isolated form	ء	ا	ے	ؠ	ں	ٮ	ح	س	ص	ط	ع	ڡ	ٯ	ڪ	ك	ګ	گ	ل	م	ډ	ړ	ۄ	ھ	ہ	ه	لا
ring	image																										
	Languages																										
FBBF	Unicode																										
ring and dots	isolated form	ء	ا	ے	ى	ڼ	ټ	ح	س	ص	ط	ع	ڡ	ٯ	ڪ	ك	ک	گ	ل	م	د	ر	و	ھ	ہ	ه	لا
ring and dots	image																										
	Languages																										
	Unicode																										
diacritics ^{(i)}	Letter Shapes ^{(ii)}	ء	ا	ے	ى	ں	ٮ	ح	س	ص	ط	ع	ڡ	ٯ	ڪ	ك	ک	گ	ل	م	د	ر	و	ھ	ہ	ه	لا

==== line ====
horizontal line	—	isolated form	ء	ا	ے	ۍ ـۍ	ں	ٮ	ح	س	ص	ط	ع	ڡ	؈	ڪ	ك	گ		ݪ	م	د	ݛ	ۅ	ھ	ہ	ه	لا
horizontal line		image																										
		Languages																		Punjabi, Marwari, Kalami, Albanian				Kirghiz				
		Unicode																					U+075B					
multiple lines	﮼	isolated form	۽	ا	ے	ى	ں	ٮ	ح	س	ص	ط	ع	ڡ	ٯ	ڪ	ك	ک	گ	ࢦ	۾	د	ر	و	ھ	ہ	ه	لا
multiple lines		image																										
		Languages																										
U+FBBC		Unicode																		U+08A6								
vertical line		isolated form	ء	ا	ے	ى	ں	ٮ	ح	س	ص	ط	ع	ڡ	ٯ	ڪ	ك	ک	گ	ل	م	د	ر	ۈ	ھ	ہ	ه	لا
vertical line		image																										
		Languages																										
		Unicode																										

==== numeral ====
- Burushaski ݸ
- Burushaski ݹ
- Burushaski ݳ
- Burushaski ݴ
- Burushaski ݶ
- Burushaski ݷ
- Burushaski ݻ

diacritics ^{(i)}			Letter Shapes ^{(ii)}	ء	ا	ے	ى	ں	ٮ	ح	س	ص	ط	ع	ڡ	ٯ	ك	ڪ	ک	گ	ل	م	د	ر	و	ھ	ہ	ه	لا
Persian numeral 2 above	٢	^{٢}	isolated form	ء	ا	ݺ	ى	ں	ٮ	ح	س	ص	ط	ع	ڡ	ٯ	ڪ	ك	ک	گ	ل	م	د	ر	ݸ	ھ	ہ	ه	لا
Persian numeral 2 above			image																										
Burushaski			Languages			Burushaski																			Burushaski				
			Unicode			U+077A																							
Persian numeral 3 above	٣	^{٣}	isolated form	ء	ا	ݻ	ݶ	ں	ٮ	ح	س	ص	ط	ع	ڡ	ٯ	ڪ	ك	ک	گ	ل	م	د	ر	و	ھ	ہ	ه	لا
Persian numeral 3 above			image																										
Burushaski	Languages					Burushaski																							
			Unicode			U+077B																							
Persian numeral 4 above	۴	^{۴}	isolated form	ء	ا	ے	ى	ں	ٮ	ح	ݽ	ص	ط	ع	ڡ	ٯ	ڪ	ك	ک	گ	ل	م	د	ر	و	ھ	ہ	ه	لا
Persian numeral 4 above			image																										
Burushaski	Languages										Burushaski																		
			Unicode								U+077D																		
Persian numeral 4 below	۴	_{۴}	isolated form	ء	ا	ے	ݷ	ں	ٮ	ݼ	س	ص	ط	ع	ڡ	ٯ	ڪ	ك	ک	گ	ل	م	د	ر	و	ھ	ہ	ه	لا
Persian numeral 4 below			image																										
Burushaski	Languages									Burushaski																			
			Unicode							U+077C																			
diacritics ^{(i)}			Letter Shapes ^{(ii)}	ء	ا	ے	ى	ں	ٮ	ح	س	ص	ط	ع	ڡ	ٯ	ڪ	ك	ک	گ	ل	م	د	ر	و	ھ	ہ	ه	لا

==== arrows ====
V below	ٚ	ٛ	isolated form	ء	ا	ے	ى	ں	ݕ	ح	س	ص	ط	ع	ڡ	ٯ	ڪ	ك	ک	گ	ل	م	د	ڕ	و	ھ	ہ	ه	لا
V below			image																										
		Languages							Serer																				
U+065B U+065A			Unicode																										
small V above	ــٚـ	◌ٚ	isolated form	ء	ا	ے	ێ	ں	ݖ	ح	س	ص	ط	ع	ڡ	ٯ	ڪ	ك	ک	گ	ڵ	م	د	ڒ	ۆ	ھ	ہ	ه	لا
small V above			image																										
		Languages							Wolof																				
U+065A			Unicode						U+0756																				
inverted V above	ــٛـ	◌ٛ	isolated form	ء	ا	ے	ؽ	ں	ٮ	ح	س	ص	ط	ع	ڡ	ٯ	ڪ	ك	ک	گ	ل	م	ۮ	ۯ	ۉ	ۿ	ہ	ه	لا
inverted V above			image																										
U+065B			Unicode																										
	Languages																												
arrow and dots			isolated form	ء	ا	ے	ى	ں	ٮ	ح	س	ص	ط	ع	ڡ	ٯ	ڪ	ك	ک	گ	ل	م	د	ر	و	ھ	ہ	ه	لا
arrow and dots			image																										
			Unicode																										
	Languages																												

==== Hamza ====
diacritics ^{(i)}			Letter Shapes ^{(ii)}	ء	ا	ے	ى	ں	ٮ	ح	س	ص	ط	ع	ڡ	ٯ	ڪ	ك	ک	گ	ل	م	د	ر	و	ھ	ہ	ه	لا
Hamza below	ــٕـ	◌ٕ	isolated form	ء	إ	ے	ى	ں	ٮ	ح	س	ص	ط	ع	ڡ	ٯ	ڪ	ك	ک	گ	ل	م	د	ر	و	ھ	ہ	ه	لإ
Hamza below			image																										
sometimes omitted in contexts where short vowel diacritics are omitted			Languages																										
U+0655			Unicode		U+0625																								U+0644 + U+0625
Hamza above	ــٔـ	◌ٔ	isolated form	ء	أ	ۓ	ئ	ں	ٮ	ځ	س	ص	ط	ع	ڡ	ٯ	ڪ	ك	ک	گ	ل	م	د	ر	ؤ	ھ	ۂ	ۀ	لأ
Hamza above			image																										
sometimes omitted in contexts where short vowel diacritics are omitted			Languages							Pashto																			
U+0674 U+0654			Unicode		U+0623	U+06D3	U+0626			U+0681															U+0624		U+06C2	U+06C0	U+0644 + U+0623
Hamza and dots			isolated form	ء	ا	ے	ى	ں	ٮ	ح	س	ص	ط	ع	ڡ	ٯ	ڪ	ك	ک	گ	ل	م	د	ر	و	ھ	ہ	ه	لا
Hamza and dots			image																										
			Unicode																										
	Languages																												

==== other semi-optional vowels ====
maddah above	ــۤـ ــٓـ ◌ٓ ◌ۤ	isolated form	ء	آ	ے	ى	ں	ٮ	ح	س	ص	ط	ع	ڡ	ٯ	ڪ	ك	ک	گ	ل	م	د	ر	و	ھ	ہ	ه	لآ
maddah above	image																											
doesn't strictly count as i'jam, but included in a lot of situations where other diacritics are left out.		Languages		Arabic, Urdu																								
U+06E4 U+0653		Unicode		U+0622																								
Wasala above		isolated form	ء	ٱ	ے	ى	ں	ٮ	ح	س	ص	ط	ع	ڡ	ٯ	ڪ	ك	ک	گ	ل	م	د	ر	و	ھ	ہ	ه	لا
Wasala above		image																										
	Languages			CA																								
none^{(v)}		Unicode		U+0671																								
diacritics ^{(i)}		Letter Shapes ^{(ii)}	ء	ا	ے	ى	ں	ٮ	ح	س	ص	ط	ع	ڡ	ٯ	ڪ	ك	ک	گ	ل	م	د	ر	و	ھ	ہ	ه	لا

=== blank line for new entries ===
==== header ====
diacritics ^{(i)}	Letter Shapes ^{(ii)}	ء	ا	ے	ى	ں	ٮ	ح	س	ص	ط	ع	ڡ	ٯ	ك	ڪ	ک	گ	ل	م	د	ر	و	ھ	ہ	ه	لا

== Footnotes ==
^i. The i'jam diacritic characters are illustrative only, in most typesetting the combined characters in the middle of the table are used. The characters used to illustrate the consonant diacritics are from Unicode set "Arabic pedagogical symbols". The "Arabic Tatweel Modifier Letter" U+0640 character used to show the positional forms doesn't work in some Nastaliq fonts.

^ii. For most letters the isolated form is shown, for select letters all forms (isolated, start, middle, and end) are shown.

^iii. Urdu Choti Yē has 2 dots below in the initial and middle positions only. The standard Arabic version ي يـ ـيـ ـي always has 2 dots below.

^iv. These characters are used by most languages that use writing systems based on Arabic, though sometimes only in foreign words.

^v. A Wasala diacritic Unicode character has been proposed but not yet released.
