= Baba Lal Badshah =

Non-profit organisation

Darbar Almast Lal Badshah
- Abbreviation: DLB
- Established: 1947
- Founder: Lal Badshah
- Type: Non-profit organisation
- Legal status: Active
- Purpose: Humanitarianism; activism; environmentalism; drug rehabilitation; secularism
- Coordinates: 31.130104°N 75.473388°E
- Website: almastbapulalbadshah.org

Almast Lal Badshah also known as Almast Bapu Lal Badshah is a Sufi saint. The dargah is a Sufiyana Darbar located in Nakodar, Jalandhar District, Punjab, India. The Darbar is a symbol of love and peace where people from all different castes and religions come and pay their respects at this Darbar.

== The Darbar ==
This Darbar located in Nakodar holds the tombs of Lal Badshah and Lovly Shah. Baba died on 26 March 2000 at 11:15 p.m.

Hans Raj Hans (also known as Hans Darvesh) is the head sewadar of this Darbar. He conducts all the religious ceremonies such as the chaddar rasm, chirag rasm and mehndi rasm. He has also been a frequent visitor.

The yearly Mela is held on 18, 19 and 20 of July. During this mela many qawwal groups perform, as well as many big Punjabi singers. Hans Raj Hans also performs on the stage.

== History ==
Lal Badshah came from the suburbs of western India which is now in Pakistan. The Sufi saint has been medicating to the poor since 1947. At the Dera, people from all religions have been blessed by Baba.
