= Effortfulness =

Concept in psychology

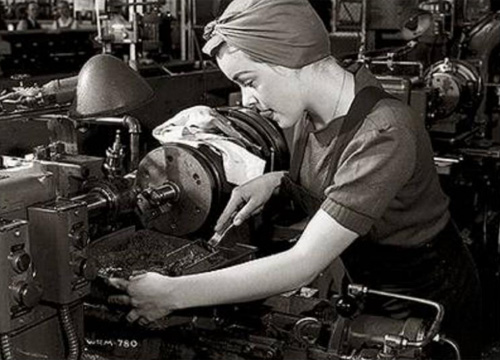

In psychology, effortfulness is the subjective experience of exertion when performing an activity, especially the mental concentration and energy required. In many applications, effortfulness is simply reported by a patient, client, or experimental subject. There has been some work establishing an association among reported effortfulness and objective measures, such as in brain imaging. Effortfulness is used as a diagnostic indicator in medical and psychological diagnosis and assessment. It is also used as an indicator in psychological experimentation, especially in the field of memory.

In the study of aging, Patrick Rabbitt proposed an effortfulness hypothesis in the 1960s: that as their hearing became less acute with age, people would require additional effort to make out what was said and that this effort made it harder to remember it.

== See also ==
- Horme – in Greek mythology, a goddess personifying energetic activity
- Laban movement analysis
