= Scriptio continua =

Style of writing without spaces between words

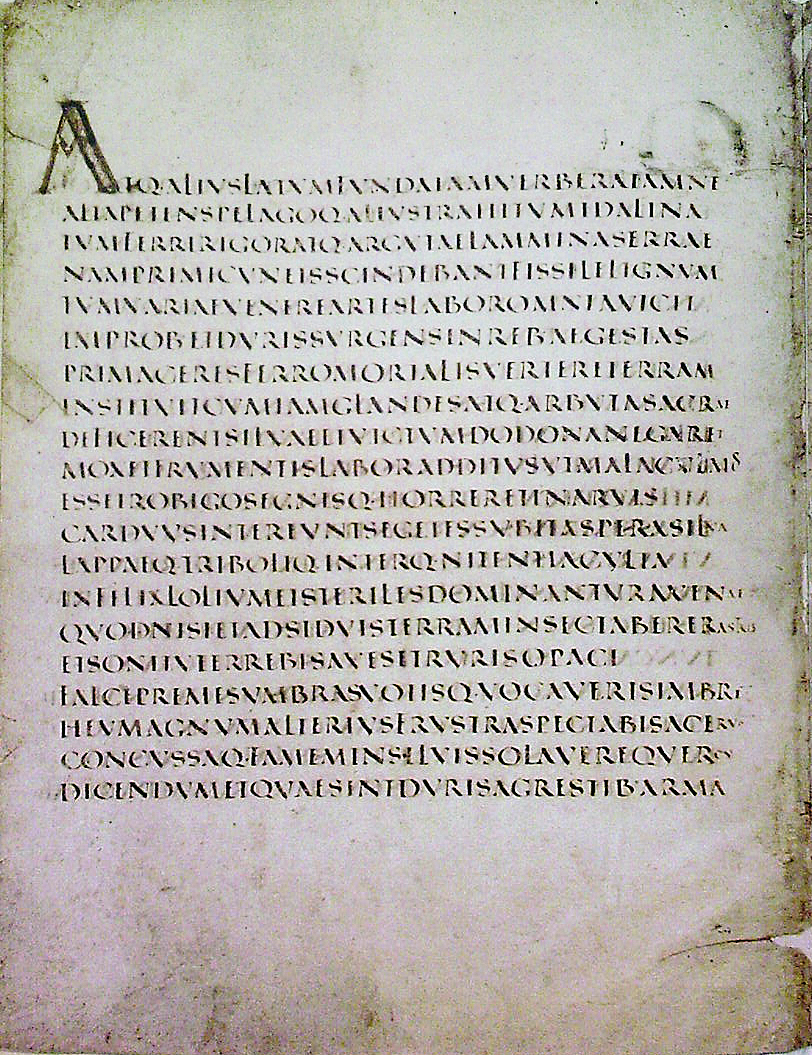
Vergilius Augusteus, Georgica 141ff, written in capitalis quadrata and in scriptio continua

Scriptio continua (Latin for 'continuous script'), also known as scriptura continua or scripta continua, is a style of writing without spaces or other marks between the words or sentences. The form also lacks punctuation, diacritics, or distinguished letter case. In the West, the oldest Greek and Latin inscriptions used word dividers to separate words in sentences; however, Classical Greek and late Classical Latin both employed scriptio continua as the norm. The scriptio continua is also known as Latin skeleton script.

== History ==
Although scriptio continua is evidenced in most Classic Greek and Classic Latin manuscripts, different writing styles are depicted in documents that date back even further. Classical Latin often used the interpunct, especially in monuments and inscriptions.

The earliest texts in Classical Greek that used the Greek alphabet, as opposed to Linear B, were formatted in a constant string of capital letters from right to left. Later, that evolved to boustrophedon, which included lines written in alternating directions.

The Latin language and the related Italic languages first came to be written using alphabetic scripts adapted from the Etruscan alphabet (itself ultimately derived from the Greek alphabet). Initially, Latin texts commonly marked word divisions by points, but later on the Romans came to follow the Greek practice of scriptio continua.

Before and after the advent of the codex, Latin and Greek script was written on scrolls by slave scribes. The role of the scribes was to simply record everything they heard to create documentation. Because speech is continuous, there was no need to add spaces. Typically, the reader of the text was a trained performer, who would have already memorised the content and breaks of the script. During the reading performances, the scroll acted as a cue sheet and therefore did not require in-depth reading.

The lack of word parsing forced the reader to distinguish elements of the script without a visual aid, but it also presented the reader with more freedom to interpret the text. The reader had the liberty to insert pauses and dictate tone, which made the act of reading a significantly more subjective activity than it is today. However, the lack of spacing also led to some ambiguity because a minor discrepancy in word parsing could give the text a different meaning. For example, a phrase written in scriptio continua as collectamexiliopubem may be interpreted as collectam ex Ilio pubem, meaning 'a people gathered from Troy', or collectam exilio pubem, 'a people gathered for exile'. Thus, readers had to be much more cognisant of the context to which the text referred.

== Decline ==
Over time, the current system of rapid silent reading for information replaced the older, slower, and more dramatic performance-based reading, and word dividers and punctuation became more beneficial to text. Though paleographers disagree about the chronological decline of scriptio continua throughout the world, it is generally accepted that the addition of spaces first appeared in Irish and Anglo-Saxon Bibles and Gospels from the seventh and eighth centuries. Subsequently, an increasing number of European texts adopted conventional spacing, and within the thirteenth and fourteenth centuries, all European texts were written with word separation.

When word separation became the standard system, it was seen as a simplification of Roman culture because it undermined the metric and rhythmic fluency generated through scriptio continua. In contrast, paleographers today identify the extinction of scriptio continua as a critical factor in augmenting the widespread absorption of knowledge in the pre-Modern Era. By saving the reader the taxing process of interpreting pauses and breaks, the inclusion of spaces could enable the brain to comprehend written text more rapidly. Furthermore, the brain could have a greater capacity to profoundly synthesize text and commit a greater portion of information to memory.

Scriptio continua is still in use in Thai script, other Southeast Asian abugidas (Burmese, Lao, Khmer, Javanese, Balinese, Sundanese script), and in languages that use Chinese characters (Chinese and Japanese). However, modern vernacular Chinese differentiates itself from ancient scriptio continua through its use of punctuation, although this method of separation already existed but was rarely used and subsequently reintroduced and borrowed from the West in the 19th and 20th centuries. Before this, the only forms of punctuation found in Chinese writings were marks to denote quotes, proper nouns, and emphasis. Modern Tibetic languages also employ a form of scriptio continua; while they punctuate syllables, they do not use spacing between units of meaning.

== Examples ==
=== Latin text ===
Latin text in scriptio continua with typical capital letters, taken from Cicero's De finibus bonorum et malorum:

- NEQVEPORROQVISQVAMESTQVIDOLOREMIPSVMQVIADOLORSITAMETCONSECTETVRADIPISCIVELIT

Which in modern punctuation is:

- Neque porro quisquam est qui dolorem ipsum quia dolor sit amet, consectetur, adipisci velit...
- "Nobody likes pain for its own sake, or looks for it and wants to have it, just because it is pain..."

With ancient Latin punctuation is: NEQVE·PORRO·QVISQVAM·EST·QVI·DOLOREM·IPSVM·QVIA·DOLOR·SIT·AMET·CONSECTETVR·ADIPISCI·VELIT

=== Greek text ===
Greek text in scriptio continua with typical capital letters, taken from Hesiod's Theogony:

- ΜΟΥΣΑΩΝΕΛΙΚΩΝΙΑΔΩΝΑΡΧΩΜΕΘΑΕΙΔΕΙΝΑΙΘΕΛΙΚΩΝΟΣΕΧΟΥΣΙΝΟΡΟΣΜΕΓΑΤΕΖΑΘΕΟΝΤΕΚΑΙΠΕΡΙΚΡΗΝΗΙΟΕΙΔΕΑΠΟΣΣΑΠΑΛΟΙΣΙΝΟΡΧΕΥΝΤΑΙΚΑΙΒΩΜΟΝΕΡΙΣΘΕΝΕΟΣΚΡΟΝΙΩΝΟΣ

Which in modern punctuation is:

- Μουσάων Ἑλικωνιάδων ἀρχώμεθ᾽ ἀείδειν, αἵ θ᾽ Ἑλικῶνος ἔχουσιν ὄρος μέγα τε ζάθεόν τε καί τε περὶ κρήνην ἰοειδέα πόσσ᾽ ἁπαλοῖσιν ὀρχεῦνται καὶ βωμὸν ἐρισθενέος Κρονίωνος·
- "From the Heliconian Muses let us begin to sing, who hold the great and holy mount of Helicon, and dance on soft feet about the deep-blue spring and the altar of the almighty son of Cronos,"

=== Hebrew text ===
Hebrew text is well known for lacking punctuation for many centuries. Modern versions of the language gradually amended those features.

=== Runic text ===
The entire Swedish Rök runestone is written in scriptio continua, which poses problems for scholars attempting to translate it. One example is a phrase repeated several times, sakumukmini. Interpretations proposed include sagum Ygg minni 'let us say the memory to Yggr', sagum mógminni 'let us say the folk-memory', and sagum ungmenni 'let us say to the group of young men'.

=== Modern Latin script ===
A form of scriptio continua has become common in internet e-mail addresses and domain names where, because the "space" character is invalid, the address for a website for "Example Fake Website" is written as examplefakewebsite.com – without spaces between the separate words. However, the "underscore" or "dash" characters are often used as stand-ins for the "space" character when its use would be invalid and their use would not be.

As another example, so-called camel case—in which the first letter of each word is capitalized—has become part of the culture of many computer programming languages. In this context, names of variables and subroutines as well as other identifiers are rendered easier to read, as in MaxDataRate. Camel case can also eliminate ambiguity: CharTable might name a table of characters, whereas Chartable could ask or answer the question, "Can (something) be charted?"

=== Chinese language ===
Chinese does not encounter the problem of incorporating spaces into text because, unlike most writing systems, Chinese characters represent morphemes and not phonemes. Chinese is therefore readable without spaces.

Western punctuation was first used in China in the 20th century as a result of interaction with Western culture.

Example Chinese sentence written in various ways
Script	Text
	Beijing is in northern China; Guangzhou is in southern China.
Normal Chinese sentence	北京在中国北方；广州在中国南方。
Without punctuation	北京在中国北方广州在中国南方
With spacing	北京 在 中国 北方；广州 在 中国 南方。
Pinyin transcription	Běijīng zài Zhōngguó běifāng; Guǎngzhōu zài Zhōngguó nánfāng.

However, sentences can still be ambiguous due to a lack of punctuation and/or word breaks. One Chinese joke concerns a contract between a landlord and a poor scholar, which was written without punctuation and thus was interpreted in two different ways:

Characters	Pinyin	English
沒魚肉也可，沒鷄鴨也可，青菜豆腐不可少，不得工錢。	Méi yú ròu yě kě, méi jī yā yě kě, qīngcài dòufu bùkě shǎo, bùdé gōngqián	Lacking fish and meat is acceptable; lacking chicken or duck is acceptable; vegetables and tofu must not be few; wages prohibited
沒魚、肉也可，沒鷄、鴨也可，青菜豆腐不可，少不得工錢。	Méi yú, ròu yě kě, méi jī, yā yě kě, qīngcài dòufu bùkě, shàobùdé gōngqián	Lacking fish, meat is acceptable; lacking chicken, duck is acceptable; vegetables and tofu must not be provided; wages mandatory

=== Japanese script ===
Japanese implements extensive use of Chinese characters—called kanji in Japanese. However, due to the radical differences between the Chinese and Japanese languages, writing Japanese exclusively in kanji would make it extremely difficult to read. This can be seen in texts that predate the modern kana system, in which Japanese was written entirely in kanji and man'yōgana, the latter of which are written solely to indicate a word's pronunciation as opposed to its meaning. For that reason, different syllabary systems called kana were developed to differentiate phonetic graphemes from ideographic ones.

Modern Japanese is typically written using three different types of graphemes, the first being kanji and the latter two being kana systems, the cursive hiragana and the angular katakana. While spaces are not normally used in writing, boundaries between words are often quickly perceived by Japanese speakers since kana are usually visually distinct from kanji. Japanese speakers also know that certain words, morphemes, and parts of speech are typically written using one of the three systems. Kanji is typically used for words of Japanese and Chinese origin as well as content words (e.g. nouns, verbs, adjectives, adverbs). Hiragana is typically used for native Japanese words, as well as commonly known words, phrases, and grammatical particles, as well as inflections of content words like verbs, adjectives, and adverbs. Katakana is typically used for loanwords from languages other than Chinese, onomatopoeia, and emphasized words.

Like Chinese, Japanese lacked any sort of punctuation until interaction with Western civilizations became more common. Punctuation was adopted during the Meiji period.

Examples of Japanese spacing
Script	Text
	Bethany Hills and Akira Takamori are living in Tokyo.
Standard Japanese writing, without spacing	ベサニー・ヒルズと高森昭は東京に住んでいます。
With spacing	ベサニー・ヒルズ と 高森 昭 は 東京 に 住んでいます。
Kana only, with spacing (sometimes employed in media for children)	ベサニー・ヒルズ と たかもり あきら は とうきょう に すんでいます。
Rōmaji	Besanī Hiruzu to Takamori Akira wa Tōkyō ni sundeimasu.
Kanji and man'yōgana	邊三仁伊日流頭吐高森昭歯東京仁須無弟位麻須

=== Thai script ===
Modern Thai script, which was said to have been created by King Ram Khamhaeng in 1283, does not contain any spaces between words. Spaces indicate only the clear endings of clauses or sentences.

Below is a sample sentence of Thai written first without spaces between words (with Thai romanization in parentheses), second in Thai with spaces between words (also with Thai romanization in parentheses), and then finally translated into English.

For example, "ในน้ำมีปลา ในนามีข้าว" (pronounced "nai nam mi pla nai na mi khao", meaning "In the water there are fish; in the paddy fields there is rice.") can also be written as "ใน น้ำ มี ปลา ใน นา มี ข้าว".

=== Javanese script ===
This example shows the first line of the Universal Declaration of Human Rights in Javanese script, and a case of the text being divided, as in some modern writing, by spaces and dash signs, which look different.

- ꦱꦧꦼꦤ꧀ꦮꦺꦴꦁꦏꦭꦲꦶꦂꦫꦏꦺꦏꦟ꧀ꦛꦶꦩꦂꦢꦶꦏꦭꦤ꧀ꦢꦂꦧꦺꦩꦂꦠꦧꦠ꧀ꦭꦤ꧀ꦲꦏ꧀ꦲꦏ꧀ꦏꦁ ꦥꦝ꧉
  (saběnwongkalairakekanthimardikalandarbemartabatlanhakhakkangpadha)
- ꧋ꦱꦧꦼꦤ꧀ ꦮꦺꦴꦁ ꦏꦭꦲꦶꦂꦫꦏꦺ ꦏꦟ꧀ꦛꦶ ꦩꦂꦢꦶꦏ ꦭꦤ꧀ ꦢꦂꦧ꧀ꦧꦺ ꦩꦠ꧀ꦠꦂꦧꦠ꧀ ꦭꦤ꧀ ꦲꦏ꧀ꦲꦏ꧀ ꦏꦁ ꦥꦝ꧉
  (saběn wong kalairake kanthi mardika lan darbe martabat lan hak-hak kang padha)
- All human beings are born free and equal in dignity and rights.

Because of the absence of space, in computer typography, the line-break have to be inserted manually, otherwise a long sentence will not break into new lines. Some computer input methods have put zero-width space (ZWS) instead for word break, which would then break the long sentences into multiple lanes, but the drawback of that method is it will not render the writing correctly.

- ꧋ꦱꦧꦼꦤ꧀ꦮꦺꦴꦁꦏꦭꦲꦶꦂꦫꦏꦺꦏꦟ꧀ꦛꦶꦩꦂꦢꦶꦏꦭꦤ꧀ꦢꦂꦧꦺꦩꦂꦠꦧꦠ꧀ꦭꦤ꧀ꦲꦏ꧀ꦲꦏ꧀ꦏꦁꦥꦝ꧉ ("incorrect" words include the first two words, which in joined form would looks like ꦱꦧꦼꦤ꧀ꦮꦺꦴꦁ)

Another way to type it is to put ZWSs not after every word, but only in words that ended with a vowel (open syllable), or special final consonant -r, -h, and -ng. Thus it will look indistinguishable from the correct output above, but the machine will read it with some "spaces" (illustrated by the Latin transliteration below) that allows for line break.

- ꧋ꦱꦧꦼꦤ꧀ꦮꦺꦴꦁꦏꦭꦲꦶꦂꦫꦏꦺꦏꦟ꧀ꦛꦶꦩꦂꦢꦶꦏꦭꦤ꧀ꦢꦂꦧ꧀ꦧꦺꦩꦠ꧀ꦠꦂꦧꦠ꧀ꦭꦤ꧀ꦲꦏ꧀ꦲꦏ꧀ꦏꦁꦥꦝ꧉
  (saběnwong kalairake kanthi mardika landarbe martabatlanhakhak kang padha)

=== Arabic script ===
Before typewriters, computers and smartphones changed the way of writing, Arabic was written continuously. That is easy because 22 letters in Arabic have final, medial and initial forms, which is comparable to the initial capital form for the Latin alphabet since the Renaissance. Six or seven letters in Arabic have only a final form (namely ا, د, ذ, ر, ز and و, as well as ء) and whenever they occur in a word they are followed by space that was originally as wide as the space between words, creating a clear visual break. There was no hyphenation either. In the early Quranic manuscripts, all diacritics in the Arabic script were also omitted because pointing or other diacritics did not exist in the Arabic script until the early 2nd millennium, and this form is called rasm. Rasm is also written continuously without spacing. In all early manuscripts, words were finished on the next line or, in many Quranic manuscripts, even on the next page. The letter hamza is the only letter of the Arabic alphabet that lacks a final, initial or medial form, only its alone or isolated form, as it is an unlinked letter.

=== Punjabi (Gurmukhi) script ===
Before the late 1960s and the early 1970s, Gurbani and other Sikh scriptures were written in the traditional method of writing the Gurmukhi script known as larivār where there were no spacing between words in the texts (interpuncts in the form of a dot were used by some to differentiate between words, such as by Guru Arjan). This is opposed to the comparatively more recent method of writing in Gurmukhi known as pad ched, which breaks the words by inserting spacing between them.

== See also ==
- Camel case – Writing format
- Codex Sinaiticus – 4th-century handwritten Bible copy in Greek
- Decimal separator – Numerical symbol
- Rasm – Arabic writing script
