= Nurse's Quran =

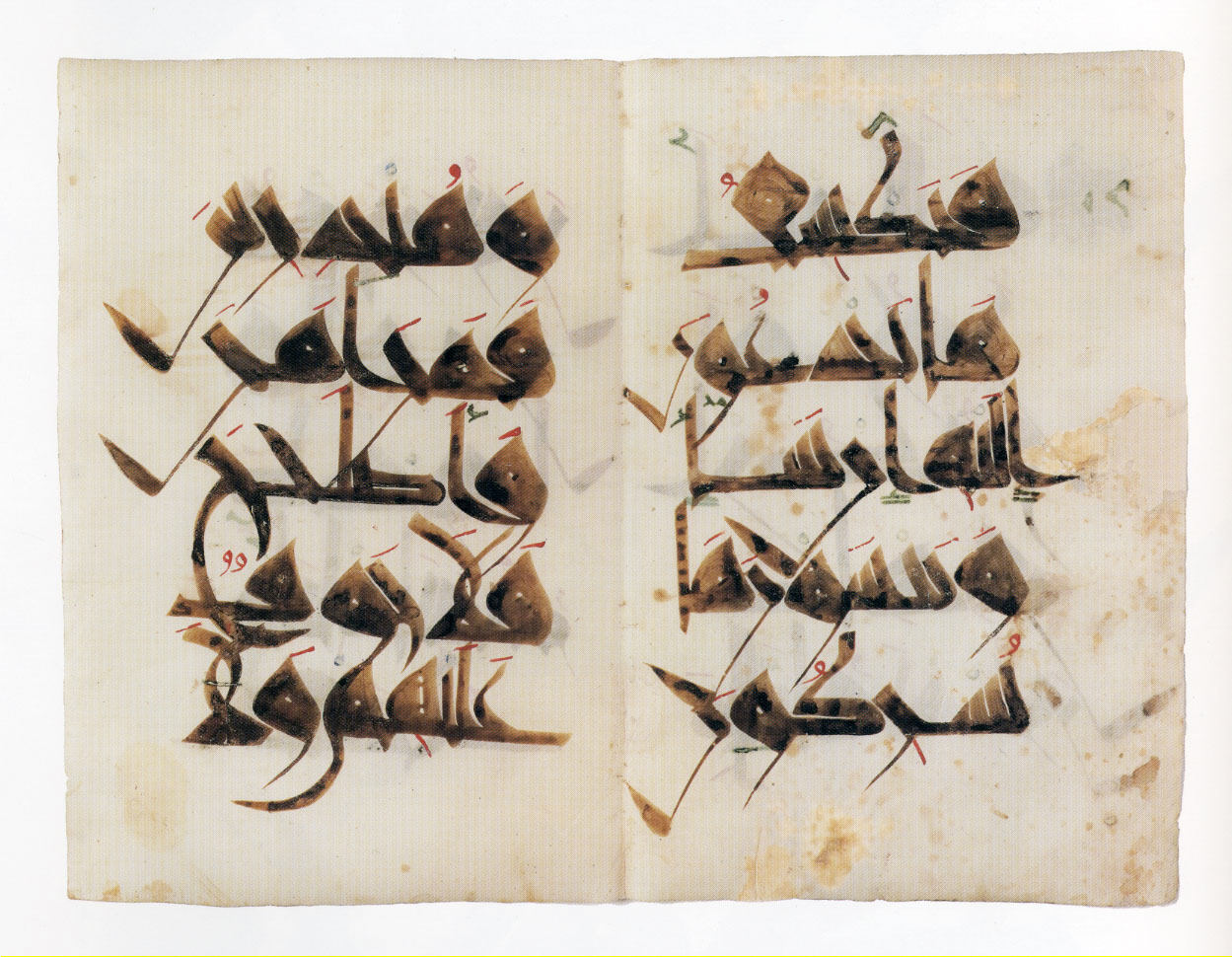
Bifolio from the Metropolitan Museum of Art

The Nurse's Quran (Arabic: مصحف الحاضنة, romanized: Mushaf al-Hadina) is a manuscript of the Quran written in Kairouan in AH 410 (1020 CE). It was commissioned by Fatima, the nurse of Prince Al-Mu'izz ibn Badis of the Zirid dynasty, and donated as an endowment to the Great Mosque of Kairouan.

== Physical description ==
The leaves of this manuscript were written in brown ink on parchment with red, blue, and green diacritical marks. According to the national institute of heritage, the book is divided into 60 hizbs with over 2900 folios of parchment in total. The pages measure 44.5 by 30 centimetres (17.5 by 11.8 in) and contain five lines each 6 centimetres (2.4 in) high.

The text is set on five lines on each page, and the contrast between the thick, rounded shapes and the narrow verticals defines this calligraphic style of Kufic script called Kairouani.

== History ==
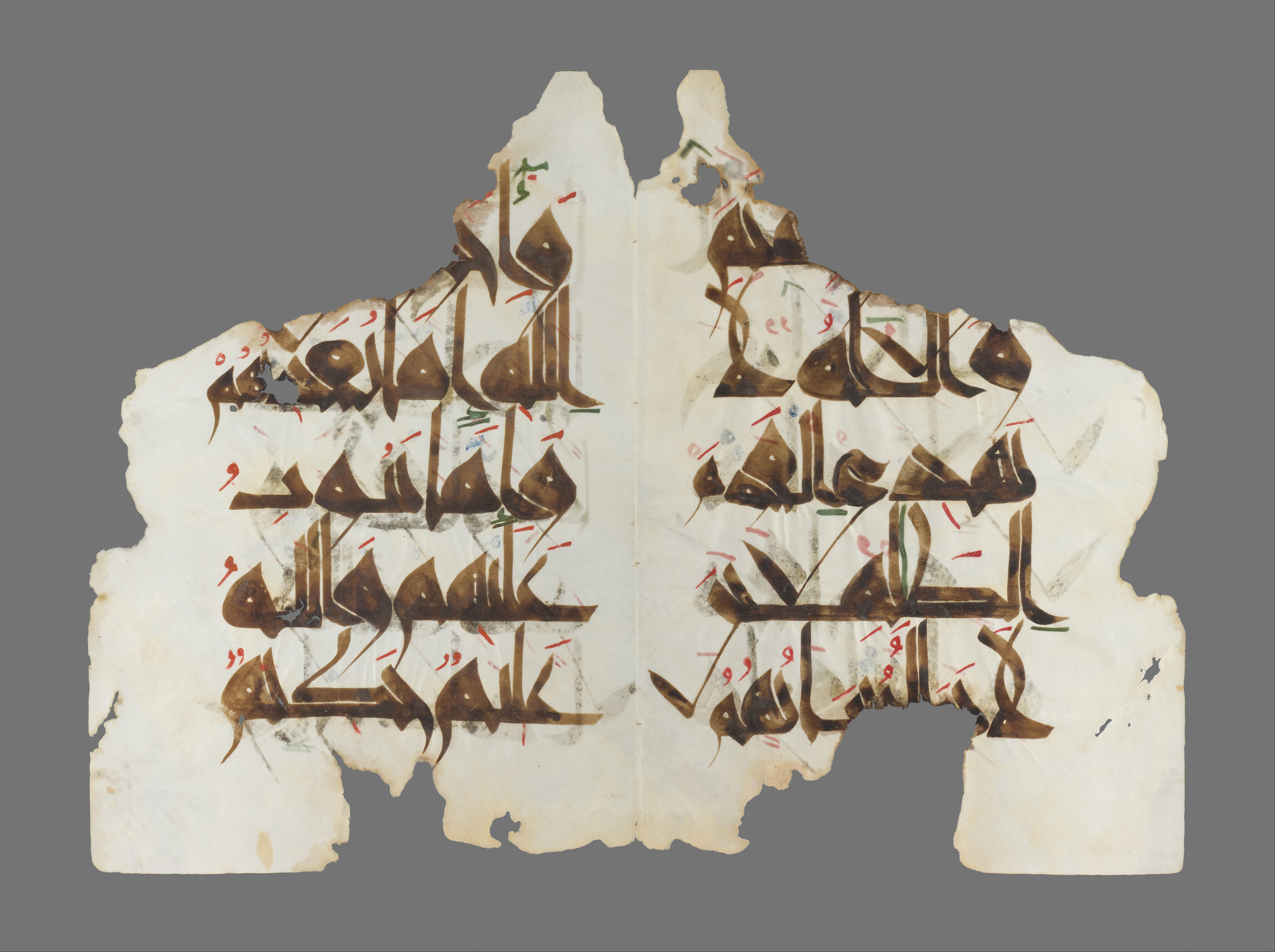
Parchment leaf from the Museum of Islamic Art in Qatar

The Nurse's Quran was finished in 1020 and written in Kairouani calligraphy, which was used for the first time during the last decades of Kairouan's intellectual and political golden era. It was kept for centuries in the maqsurah of Ibn Badis, a small cell measuring 8 by 6 metres (26 by 20 ft) next to the qibla wall that served as a library in the Great Mosque's main prayer room.

The Nurse's Quran was discovered after the publication of an article in an Egyptian journal in 1897 criticizing the conservation of the collections of the Great Mosque of Kairouan. Later in 1948, the French archaeologist Louis Poinsot conducted deeper research on the manuscripts. He disassembled them and took their bindings to the Bardo National Museum leaving the parchments separated, and classified by size and condition.

According to a tahbiss describing the people engaged in the manuscript's creation, the chief of the scriptorium, Ali Ibn Ahmed al-Warraq, and Fatimah Hadhinah, the Zirid prince's nurse, commissioned the creation of the manuscript for the Great Mosque. Additionally, according to some historians, Durrah al-Katiba, a second woman, was the scribe. This Quran was later donated to enrich the library of the great mosque as part of a political strategy endorsed by the Qadi of Kairouan, Abdallah Ben Hachem.

In the Quran of the Fadhel, one of the sentences of a colophon confirms that the book was written by women: "she wrote it with her hands".

== Location ==
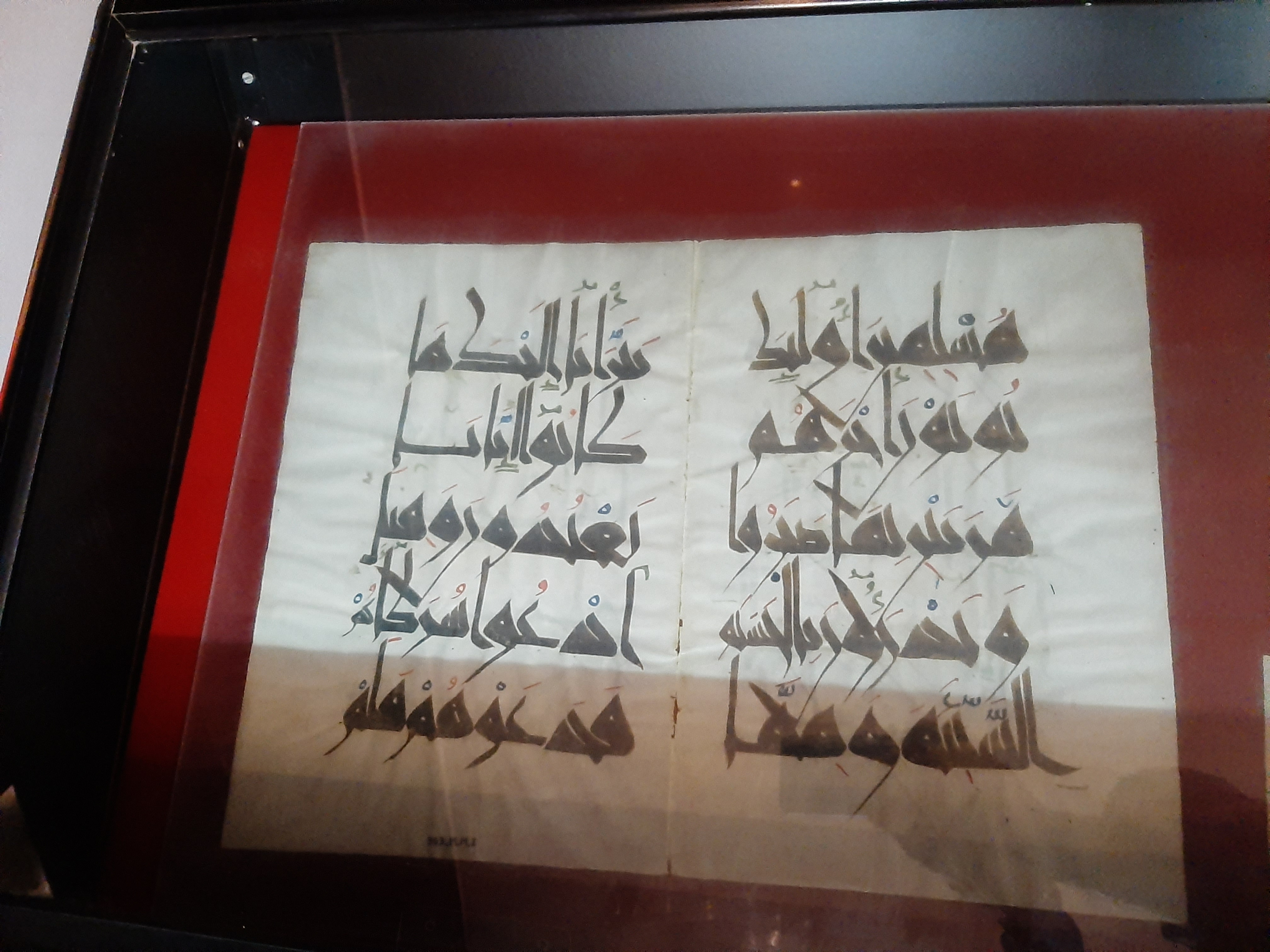
Pages of the Nurse's Quran exposed at the Mahdia Museum

Besides this, another trace of the Nurse’s Quran can be found in the medieval inventory set in 1294 by a scribe called Al Khalidini. According to this inventory, the manuscript is just an element of a 125 religious manuscript collection, 65 of which are Qurans. This document gave a legal status to the manuscript as a protected item of the library.

" And a Khitmah of Qur’an in sixty juz’, of big format, with a Kufic Rayhani script, five lines, on parchment. Each juz’ of it has a gilded opening, surah headings and hizb markers and tenth’s markers. Some of them are gilded in their closing. Vocalizations are in red, green and azure. Some of them are covered in leather on wood, others in silk on leather on wood, and some in silk on wood. All of them have lost their ornamentation. This is how the description of this Khitmah appears in the Sigill cited, and this is how it appears now, with its bindings destroyed."

Sections of the manuscript are currently located in institutions in multiple countries, such as the Metropolitan Museum in New York, The David Collection in Copenhagen, the Museum of Islamic Art in Doha. The most substantial part is preserved in Tunisia at the Raqqada National Museum of Islamic art, the Mahdia Museum in Mahdia, and the Bardo Museum in Tunis.
