= Rasm =

Arabic writing script

Early written Arabic used only rasm (in black). Later Arabic added ʾiʿjām diacritics (examples in red) so that homographic consonants, for example these two letters ص ض, could be distinguished. Short vowels are indicated by harakat diacritics (examples in blue) which is used in the Qur'an but not in most written Arabic.

Rasm (Arabic: رَسْم [ræsm]) is an Arabic writing script often used in the early centuries of Classical Arabic literature (7th century – early 11th century AD). It is the same as today's Arabic script except for the difference that the Arabic diacritics are omitted. These diacritics include consonant pointing or ʾiʿjām (إِعْجَام), and supplementary diacritics or taškīl (تَشْكِيل). The latter include the ḥarakāt (حَرَكَات) short vowel marks—singular: ḥarakah (حَرَكَة). As an example, in rasm, the two distinct letters ص ض are indistinguishable because ʾiʿjām is omitted, or letters similar in shape ک ك may also become indistinguishable if the diacritics are omitted. Rasm is also known as Arabic skeleton script. This concept is somewhat similar to scriptio continua in the Latin script, where all spaces and other punctuations is omitted. The rasm form was common for writing Arabic until the early 2nd millennium.

== History ==
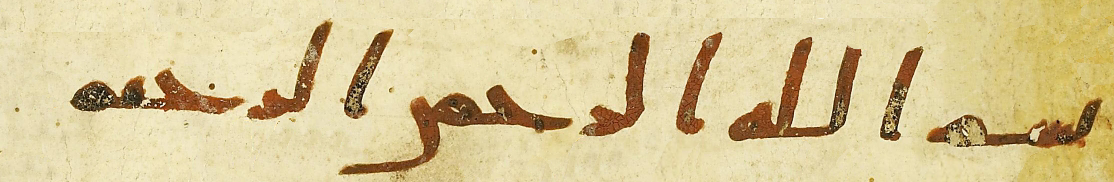
The basmala as written on the Birmingham mus'haf manuscript, the oldest surviving copy of the Qur'an. Rasm: "ٮسم الـلـه الرحمں الرحىم".

In the early Arabic manuscripts that survive today (physical manuscripts dated 7th and 8th centuries AD), one finds dots but "putting dots was in no case compulsory". The very earliest manuscripts have some consonantal diacritics, though use them only sparingly. Signs indicating short vowels and the hamza are largely absent from Arabic orthography until the 2nd to 8th century. One might assume that scribes would write these few diacritics in the most textually ambiguous places of the rasm, so as to make the Arabic text easier to read. However, many scholars have noticed that this is not the case. By focusing on the few diacritics that do appear in early manuscripts, Adam Bursi "situates early Qurʾān manuscripts within the context of other Arabic documents of the first/seventh century that exhibit similarly infrequent diacritics. Shared patterns in the usages of diacritics indicate that early Qurʾān manuscripts were produced by scribes relying upon very similar orthographic traditions to those that produced Arabic papyri and inscriptions of the first/seventh century." He concludes that Quranic scribes "neither 'left out' diacritics to leave the text open, nor 'added' more to clarify it, but in most cases simply wrote diacritics where they were accustomed to writing them by habit or convention."

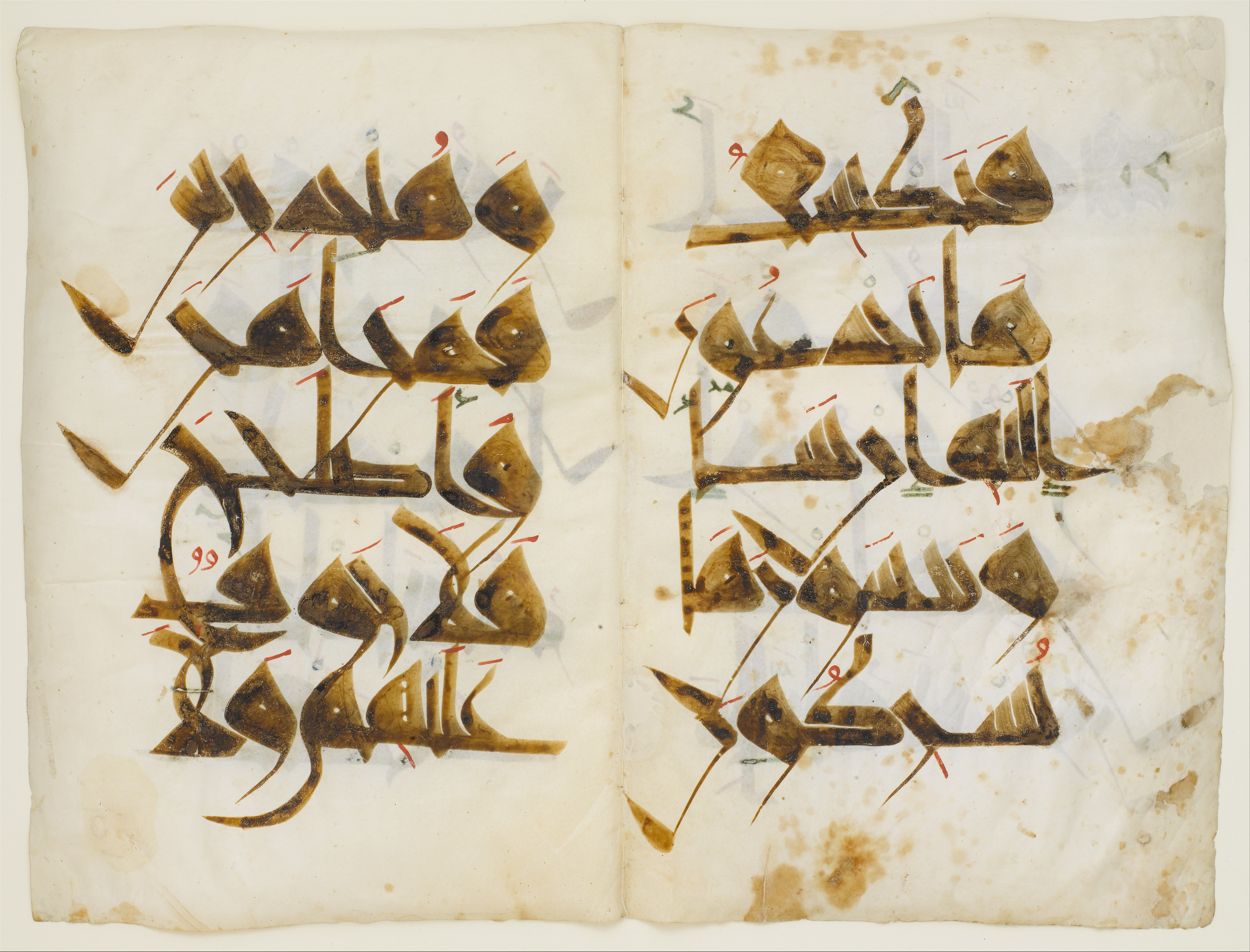
A page from the Nurse's Quran, written in Kairouani calligraphy. (1019–20 AC)

Rasm means 'drawing', 'outline', or 'pattern' in Arabic. When speaking of the Qur'an, it stands for the basic text made of the 18 letters without the Arabic diacritics which mark vowels (taškīl) and disambiguate consonants (ʾiʿjām).

== Letters ==
The rasm is the oldest part of the Arabic script; it has 18 elements, excluding the ligature of lām and alif. When isolated and in the final position, the 18 letters are visually distinct. However, in the initial and medial positions, certain letters that are distinct otherwise are not differentiated visually. This results in only 15 visually distinct glyphs each in the initial and medial positions.

Name	Final	Medial	Initial	Isolated	Rasm				
Name	Final	Medial	Initial	Isolated	Final	Medial	Initial	Isolated	Code point
ʾalif	ـا	ـا	ا	ا	ـا	ـا	ا	ا	U+0627
Bāʾ	ـب	ـبـ	بـ	ب	ـٮ	ـٮـ	ٮـ	ٮ	U+066E
Tāʾ	ـت	ـتـ	تـ	ت	ـٮ	ـٮـ	ٮـ	ٮ	U+066E
Ṯāʾ	ـث	ـثـ	ثـ	ث	ـٮ	ـٮـ	ٮـ	ٮ	U+066E
Nūn	ـن	ـنـ	نـ	ن	ـں	ـںـ	ںـ	ں	U+06BA^{[a]}
Yāʾ	ـي	ـيـ	يـ	ي	ـى	ـىـ	ىـ	ى	U+0649
Alif maqṣūrah	ـى			ى	ـى	ـىـ	ىـ	ى	U+0649
Ǧīm	ـج	ـجـ	جـ	ج	ـح	ـحـ	حـ	ح	U+062D
Ḥāʾ	ـح	ـحـ	حـ	ح	ـح	ـحـ	حـ	ح	U+062D
Ḫāʾ	ـخ	ـخـ	خـ	خ	ـح	ـحـ	حـ	ح	U+062D
Dāl	ـد	ـد	د	د	ـد	ـد	د	د	U+062F
Ḏāl	ـذ	ـذ	ذ	ذ	ـد	ـد	د	د	U+062F
Rāʾ	ـر	ـر	ر	ر	ـر	ـر	ر	ر	U+0631
Zāy	ـز	ـز	ز	ز	ـر	ـر	ر	ر	U+0631
Sīn	ـس	ـسـ	سـ	س	ـس	ـسـ	سـ	س	U+0633
Šīn	ـش	ـشـ	شـ	ش	ـس	ـسـ	سـ	س	U+0633
Ṣād	ـص	ـصـ	صـ	ص	ـص	ـصـ	صـ	ص	U+0635
Ḍād	ـض	ـضـ	ضـ	ض	ـص	ـصـ	صـ	ص	U+0635
Ṭāʾ	ـط	ـطـ	طـ	ط	ـط	ـطـ	طـ	ط	U+0637
Ẓāʾ	ـظ	ـظـ	ظـ	ظ	ـط	ـطـ	طـ	ط	U+0637
ʿayn	ـع	ـعـ	عـ	ع	ـع	ـعـ	عـ	ع	U+0639
Ġayn	ـغ	ـغـ	غـ	غ	ـع	ـعـ	عـ	ع	U+0639
Fāʾ	ـف	ـفـ	فـ	ف	ـڡ	ـڡـ	ڡـ	ڡ	U+06A1
Fāʾ (Maghrib)	ـڢ / ـڡ	ـڢـ	ڢـ	ڢ / ڡ	ـڡ	ـڡـ	ڡـ	ڡ	U+06A1
Qāf	ـق	ـقـ	قـ	ق	ـٯ	ـٯـ	ٯـ	ٯ	U+066F
Qāf (Maghrib)	ـڧ / ـٯ	ـڧـ	ڧـ	ڧ / ٯ	ـٯ	ـٯـ	ٯـ	ٯ	U+066F
Kāf	ـك / ـک	ـكـ	كـ	ك / ک	ـک	ـکـ	کـ	ک	U+06A9
Lām	ـل	ـلـ	لـ	ل	ـل	ـلـ	لـ	ل	U+0644
Mīm	ـم	ـمـ	مـ	م	ـم	ـمـ	مـ	م	U+0645
Hāʾ	ـه	ـهـ	هـ	ه	ـه	ـهـ	هـ	ه	U+0647
Tāʾ marbūṭah	ـة			ة	ـه			ه	U+0647
Wāw	ـو	ـو	و	و	ـو	ـو	و	و	U+0648
Hamzah	ء	ء	ء	ء	(None)^{[b]}				

- ^a This character may not display correctly in some fonts. The dot should not appear in all four positional forms and the initial and medial forms should join with following character. In other words the initial and medial forms should look exactly like those of a dotless bāʾ while the isolated and final forms should look like those of a dotless nūn.
- ^b There is no hamzah in rasm writing, including hamzah-on-the-line (i.e., hamzah between letters).

At the time when the ʾiʿjām was optional, letters deliberately lacking the points of ʾiʿjām: ⟨ح⟩ /ħ/, ⟨د⟩ /d/, ⟨ر⟩ /r/, ⟨س⟩ /s/, ⟨ص⟩ /sˤ/, ⟨ط⟩ /tˤ/, ⟨ع⟩ /ʕ/, ⟨ل⟩ /l/, ⟨ه⟩ /h/ — could be marked with a small v-shaped sign above or below the letter, or a semicircle, or a miniature of the letter itself (e.g. a small س to indicate that the letter in question is س and not ش), or one or several subscript dots, or a superscript hamza, or a superscript stroke. These signs, collectively known as ‘alāmātu-l-ihmāl, are still occasionally used in modern Arabic calligraphy, either for their original purpose (i.e. marking letters without ʾiʿjām), or often as purely decorative space-fillers. The small ک above the kāf in its final and isolated forms ⟨ك ـك⟩ was originally ‘alāmātu-l-ihmāl, but became a permanent part of the letter. Previously this sign could also appear above the medial form of kāf, instead of the stroke on its ascender.

== Examples ==
Among the historical examples of rasm script are the Kufic Blue Qur'an and the Samarkand Qurʾan. The latter is written almost entirely in Kufic rasm.

The following is an example of rasm from Surah Al-A'raf (7), āyah 86 and 87, in the Samarkand Qur'an, and its digital equivalent rasm, rasm with normal spacing, and then fully vocalized with all diacretics:

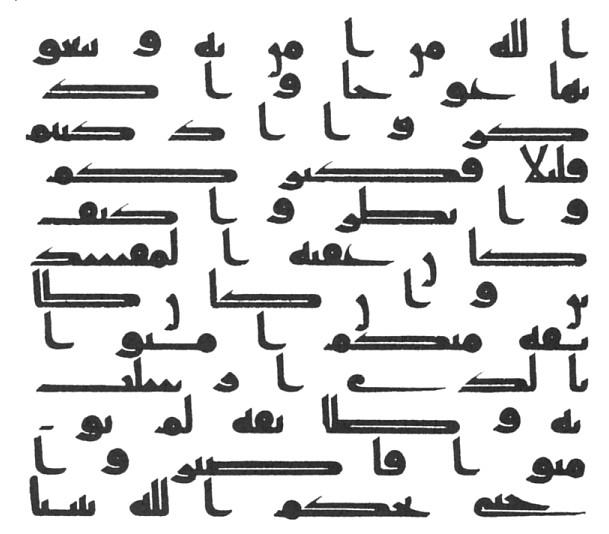

Digital rasm with spaces	Digital rasm	Fully vocalized
ا لل‍ه مں ا مں ٮه و ٮٮعو	الل‍ه مں امں ٮه وٮٮعو	ٱللَّٰهِ مَنْ آمَنَ بِهِ وَتَبْغُو
ٮها عو حا و ا د	ٮها عوحا واد	نَهَا عِوَجًا وَٱذْ
کر و ا ا د کٮٮم	کروا اد کٮٮم	كُرُوا۟ إِذْ كُنْتُمْ
ڡلٮلا ڡکٮر کم	ڡلٮلا ڡکٮرکم	قَلِيلًا فَكَثَّرَكُمْ
و ا ٮطر وا کٮڡ	واٮطروا کٮڡ	وَٱنْظُرُوا۟ كَيْفَ
کا ں عڡٮه ا لمڡسد	کاں عڡٮه المڡسد	كَانَ عَٰقِبَةُ الْمُفْسِدِ
ٮں و ا ں کا ں طا	ٮں واں کاں طا	ينَ وَإِنْ كَانَ طَا
ٮڡه مٮکم ا مٮو ا	ٮڡه مٮکم امٮوا	ئِفَةٌ مِنْكُمْ آمَنُوا۟
ٮالد ى ا ر سلٮ	ٮالدى ارسلٮ	بِٱلَّذِي أُرْسِلْتُ
ٮه و طا ٮڡه لم ٮو	ٮه وطاٮڡه لم ٮو	بِهِ وَطَائِفَةٌ لَمْ يُؤْ
مٮو ا ڡا صٮر و ا	مٮوا ڡاصٮروا	مِنُوا۟ فَٱصْبِرُوا۟
حٮى ٮحکم ا لل‍ه ٮٮٮٮا	حٮى ٮحکم الل‍ه ٮٮٮٮا	حَتَّىٰ يَحْكُمَ ٱللَّٰهُ بَيْنَنَا

== Digital examples ==
Description	Example
Rasm	الاٮحدىه العرٮىه
Short vowel diacritics omitted. This is the style used for most modern secular documents.	الأبجدية العربية
All diacritics. This style is used to show pronunciation unambiguously in dictionaries and modern Qurans. Alif waṣlah (ٱ) is only used in Classical Arabic.	ٱلْأَبْجَدِيَّة ٱلْعَرَبِيَّة
Transliteration and IPA	al-Abjadiyyah al-‘Arabiyyah /al.ʔab.dʒa.dij.ja al.ʕa.ra.bij.ja/

Compare the Basmala (Arabic: بَسْمَلَة), the beginning verse of the Qurʾān with all diacritics and with the rasm only. Note that when rasm is written with spaces, spaces do not only occur between words. Within a word, spaces also appear between adjacent letters that are not connected, and this type of rasm is old and not used lately.

Rasm with spaces ^{[c]}	‍ ٮسم‌‌ ا ل‍ل‍ه ا لر حمں‌ ا لر حىم
Rasm only ^{[c]}	ٮسم ال‍ل‍ه الرحمں الرحىم
Iʿjām and all diacritics ^{[c]}	بِسْمِ ٱللَّٰهِ ٱلرَّحْمَٰنِ ٱلرَّحِيمِ
Iʿjām and rasm ^{[c]}	بسم الله الرحمن الرحيم
Basmala Unicode character U+FDFD	﷽
Transliteration	bi-smi llāhi r-raḥmāni r-raḥīmi

^c. The sentence may not display correctly in some fonts. It appears as it should if the full Arabic character set from the Arial font is installed; or one of the SIL International fonts Scheherazade or Lateef; or Katibeh.

=== Examples of Common Phrases ===
Qurʾanic Arabic with Iʿjam	Qurʾanic Arabic Rasm	Phrase
بِسْمِ ٱل‍لَّٰهِ ٱلرَّحْمَٰنِ ٱلرَّحِيمِ	ٮسم ال‍له الرحمں الرحىم	In the name of God, the All-Merciful, the Especially-Merciful.
أَعُوذُ بِٱل‍لَّٰهِ مِنَ ٱلشَّيْطَٰنِ ٱلرَّجِيمِ	اعود ٮال‍له مں السىطں الرحىم	I seek refuge in God from the pelted Satan.
أَعُوذُ بِٱل‍لَّٰهِ ٱلسَّمِيعِ ٱلْعَلِيمِ مِنَ ٱلشَّيْطَٰنِ ٱلرَّجِيمِ	اعود ٮال‍له السمىع العلىم مں السىطں الرحىم	I seek refuge in God, the All-Hearing, the All-Knowing, from the pelted Satan.
ٱلسَّلَٰمُ عَلَيْکُمْ	السلم علىکم	Peace be upon you.
ٱلسَّلَٰمُ عَلَيْکُمْ وَرَحْمَتُ ٱل‍لَّٰهِ وَبَرَکَٰتُهُ	السلم علىکم ورحمٮ ال‍له وٮرکٮه	Peace be upon you, as well as the mercy of God and His blessings.
سُبْحَٰنَ ٱل‍لَّٰهِ	سٮحں ال‍له	Glorified is God.
ٱلْحَمْدُ لِ‍لَّٰهِ	الحمد ل‍له	All praise is due to God.
لَا إِلَٰهَ إِلَّا ٱل‍لَّٰهُ	لا اله الا ال‍له	There is no deity but God.
ٱل‍لَّٰهُ أَکْبَرُ	ال‍له اکٮر	God is greater [than everything].
أَسْتَغْفِرُ ٱل‍لَّٰهَ	اسٮعڡر ال‍له	I seek the forgiveness of God.
أَسْتَغْفِرُ ٱل‍لَّٰهَ رَبِّي وَأَتُوبُ إِلَيْهِ	اسٮعڡر ال‍له رٮى واٮوٮ الىه	I seek the forgiveness of God and repent to Him.
سُبْحَٰنَکَ ٱل‍لَّٰهُمَّ	سٮحںک ال‍لهم	Glorified are you, O God.
سُبْحَٰنَ ٱل‍لَّٰهِ وَبِحَمْدِهِ	سٮحں ال‍له وٮحمده	Glorified is God and by His praise.
سُبْحَٰنَ رَبِّيَ ٱلْعَظِيمِ وَبِحَمْدِهِ	سٮحں رٮى العطىم وٮحمده	Glorified is my God, the Great, and by His praise.
سُبْحَٰنَ رَبِّيَ ٱلْأَعْلَىٰ وَبِحَمْدِهِ	سٮحں رٮى الاعلى وٮحمده	Glorified is my God, the Most High, and by His praise.
لَا حَوْلَ وَلَا قُوَّةَ إِلَّا بِٱل‍لَّٰهِ ٱلْعَلِيِّ ٱلْعَظِيمِ	لا حول ولا ٯوه الا ٮال‍له العلى العطىم	There is no power no strength except from God, the Exalted, the Great.
لَا إِلَٰهَ إِلَّا أَنْتَ سُبْحَٰنَکَ إِنِّي کُنْتُ مِنَ ٱلظَّٰلِمِينَ	لا اله الا اںٮ سٮحںک اںى کںٮ مں الطلمىں	There is no god except You, glorified are you! I have indeed been among the wrongdoers.
حَسْبُنَا ٱل‍لَّٰهُ وَنِعْمَ ٱلْوَکِيلُ	حسٮںا ال‍له وںعم الوکىل	God is sufficient for us, and He is an excellent Trustee.
إِنَّا لِ‍لَّٰهِ وَإِنَّا إِلَيْهِ رَٰجِعُونَ	اںا ل‍له واںا الىه رحعوں	Verily we belong to God, and verily to Him do we return.
مَا شَاءَ ٱل‍لَّٰهُ کَانَ وَمَا لَمْ يَشَاءُ لَمْ يَکُنْ	ما سا ال‍له کاں وما لم ىسا لم ىکں	What God wills will be, and what God does not will, will not be.
إِنْ شَاءَ ٱل‍لَّٰهُ	اں سا ال‍له	If God wills.
مَا شَاءَ ٱل‍لَّٰهُ	ما سا ال‍له	What God wills.
بِإِذْنِ ٱل‍لَّٰهِ	ٮادں ال‍له	By the permission of God.
جَزَاکَ ٱل‍لَّٰهُ خَيْرًا	حراک ال‍له حىرا	God reward you [with] goodness.
بَٰرَکَ ٱل‍لَّٰهُ فِيکَ	ٮرک ال‍له ڡىک	God bless you.
فِي سَبِيلِ ٱل‍لَّٰهِ	ڡى سٮىل ال‍له	On the path of God.
لَا إِلَٰهَ إِلَّا ٱل‍لَّٰهُ مُحَمَّدٌ رَسُولُ ٱل‍لَّٰهِ	لا اله الا ال‍له محمد رسول ال‍له	There is no deity but God, Muhammad is the messenger of God.
لَا إِلَٰهَ إِلَّا ٱل‍لَّٰهُ مُحَمَّدٌ رَسُولُ ٱل‍لَّٰهِ عَلِيٌّ وَلِيُّ ٱل‍لَّٰهِ	لا اله الا ال‍له محمد رسول ال‍له على ولى ال‍له	There is no deity but God, Muhammad is the messenger of God, Ali is the vicegerent of God. (Usually recited by Shia Muslims)
أَشْهَدُ أَنْ لَا إِلَٰهَ إِلَّا ٱل‍لَّٰهُ وَأَشْهَدُ أَنَّ مُحَمَّدًا رَسُولُ ٱل‍لَّٰهِ	اسهد اں لا اله الا ال‍له واسهد اں محمدا رسول ال‍له	I bear witness that there is no deity but God, and I bear witness that Muhammad is the messenger of God.
أَشْهَدُ أَنْ لَا إِلَٰهَ إِلَّا ٱل‍لَّٰهُ وَأَشْهَدُ أَنَّ مُحَمَّدًا رَسُولُ ٱل‍لَّٰهِ وَأَشْهَدُ أَنَّ عَلِيًّا وَلِيُّ ٱل‍لَّٰهِ	اسهد اں لا اله الا ال‍له واسهد اں محمدا رسول ال‍له واسهد اں علىا ولى ال‍له	I bear witness that there is no deity but God, and I bear witness that Muhammad is the messenger of God, and I bear witness that Ali is the vicegerent of God. (Usually recited by Shia Muslims)
ٱل‍لَّٰهُمَّ صَلِّ عَلَىٰ مُحَمَّدٍ وَآلِ مُحَمَّدٍ	ال‍لهم صل على محمد وال محمد	O God, bless Muhammad and the Progeny of Muhammad.
ٱل‍لَّٰهُمَّ صَلِّ عَلَىٰ مُحَمَّدٍ وَآلِ مُحَمَّدٍ وَعَجِّلْ فَرَجَهُمْ وَٱلْعَنْ أَعْدَاءَهُمْ	ال‍لهم صل على محمد وال محمد وعحل ڡرحهم والعں اعداهم	O God, bless Muhammad and the Progeny of Muhammad, and hasten their alleviation and curse their enemies. (Usually recited by Shia Muslims)
ٱل‍لَّٰهُمَّ عَجِّلْ لِوَلِيِّکَ ٱلْفَرَجَ وَٱلْعَافِيَةَ وَٱلنَّصْرَ	ال‍لهم عحل لولىک الڡرح والعاڡىه والںصر	O God, hasten the alleviation of your vicegerent (i.e. Imam Mahdi), and grant him vitality and victory. (Usually recited by Shia Muslims)
لَا سَيْفَ إِلَّا ذُو ٱلْفَقَارِ وَلَا فَتَىٰ إِلَّا عَلِيٌّ	لا سىڡ الا دو الڡٯار ولا ڡٮى الا على	There is no sword but the Zu al-Faqar, and there is no youth but Ali. (Usually recited by Shia Muslims)

== See also ==
- Kufic
- Abjad numerals
- History of the Arabic alphabet
- Qiraʾat
- Scriptio continua, an analogous concept in the Latin script where all spaces and other punctuations is omitted.
- Decimal separator
- Modern Arabic mathematical notation
- Book Pahlavi, an Iranian script with similar graphemic convergence.
