= Dorothy V. M. Bishop =

British psychologist

Dorothy Bishop FBA FMedSci
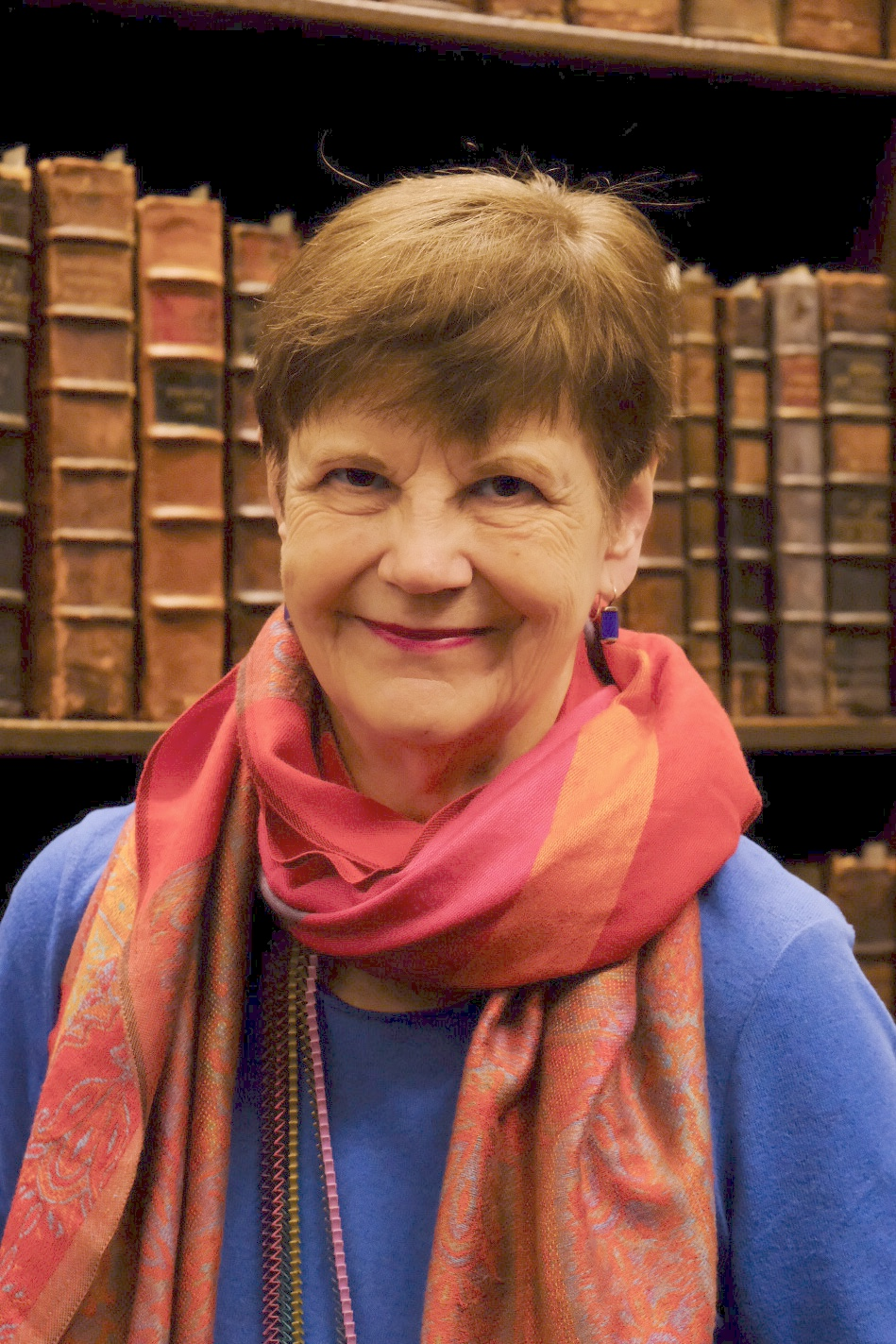
- Bishop in 2024
- Born: Dorothy Vera Margaret Bishop; 14 February 1952 (age 74); Ilford, East London, UK
- Education: University of Oxford; University of London
- Spouse: Patrick Rabbitt (m. 1976)
- Awards: Honorary DSc; Wellcome Trust Principal Research Fellow
- Scientific career
- Fields: Psychology; Neuroscience; Language; Developmental disorders
- Workplaces: University of Oxford; University of Manchester; Newcastle University
- Thesis: Comprehension of Grammar Normal and Abnormal Development (1977)
- Doctoral advisor: Freda Newcombe
- Website: deevybee.blogspot.co.uk www.psy.ox.ac.uk/team/dorothy-bishop

Dorothy Vera Margaret Bishop (born 14 February 1952) is a British psychologist specialising in developmental disorders specifically, developmental language impairments. She is Emeritus Professor of Developmental Neuropsychology at the University of Oxford, where she worked from 1998 until her retirement in 2022. She is an honorary fellow of St John's College, Oxford.

== Early life and education ==
Bishop was born in Ilford, East London, on 14 February 1952. In 1973, she earned a Bachelor of Arts degree with Honours in Experimental Psychology from St Hugh's College, Oxford. In 1975, she completed her Master of Philosophy in Clinical Psychology at the University of London. In 1978, Bishop completed her Doctor of Philosophy at University of Oxford.

While studying for her undergraduate degree, Bishop developed an interest in cognitive disorders. After her MPhil, she returned to Oxford to work with Freda Newcombe at the Neuropsychology Unit in Radcliffe Infirmary. Newcombe steered Bishop towards cases of children with developmental language disorders and launched her career as a developmental neuropsychologist.

== Research and career ==
Bishop's research spanned Psychology, Neuroscience, Genetics, Language and Developmental Disorders.

She is one of the co-founders of the video-led campaign, RALLI ("Raising Awareness of Language Learning Impairments", now called RADLD), which aims to develop awareness of language learning impairments, including Specific language impairment.

Bishop has published some of her academic work as D.V.M. Bishop. This is to avoid any prejudices that may be held against her as a female academic.

Dorothy Bishop was Professor of Developmental Neuropsychology at the University of Oxford where, funded by the Wellcome Trust, she led a series of research of children's communication disorders. Her research has also been funded by the Medical Research Council (MRC). She retired in 2022.

=== Children's Communication Checklist ===
In 1998, Bishop created what she called the Children's Communication Checklist (CCC). The goal of the CCC was to help diagnose children who did not have an apparent reason for communication errors. The CCC specifically looked to identify pragmatic language and specific language impairments. The CCC allowed Bishop and other researchers to reliably identify language impairments but give clues to other potential disorders which may not have been apparent such as high functioning autism, attention deficit hyperactivity disorder, or Williams syndrome. A second, updated, edition of the CCC was released in 2001.

=== CATALISE ===
When Bishop began her studies of cognitive disorders, research into language development was relatively limited. Though more research has been conducted, there is not a cohesive framework of research for specialists to rely on when assessing and diagnosing children with language disorders. In 2016, Bishop began a multiple part Delphi project. In this particular project, Bishop was attempting to define a set criteria for identifying children who may need intervention through a multinational and multidiscipline study. In the first phase of this study, participation of 59 experts from fields such as education, speech-language therapy, and pediatrics from several countries including New Zealand, the United Kingdom, and United States of America provided a range of expertise and experience. The researchers submitted findings to a panel who agreed with an 80% consensus. In phase two of this project, similar parameters were followed to determine what terminology should be accepted in studies and treatment.

=== RADLD ===
Because of her intense study of children's language impairments, Bishop co-founded RADLD ("Raising Awareness of Developmental Language Disorder", formerly known as RALLI). RADLD is an international advocacy organisation, with a mission statement to "foster a substantial increase in international awareness of DLD". Its committee comprises members from the UK, USA, Canada, China and Australia. RADLD provides resources in over 20 languages, and has ambassadors in over 40 countries.

=== Awards and honours ===
Bishop was elected a Fellow of the Royal Society (FRS) in 2014 for "substantial contributions to the improvement of natural knowledge". Her nomination read:

Dorothy Bishop is the leading researcher on developmental disorders affecting language and communication. Her work has been foundational for the genetics of developmental disorders: she has been a pioneer in the use of twin data to reveal genetic contributions to language disorders, using theoretically motivated measures to refine the heritable phenotype. She has devised measures that differentiate types of language impairment and are now indispensable for both research and clinical diagnosis. By comparing and contrasting dyslexia, specific language impairment and autism, Bishop has challenged views of these as discrete conditions, and illuminated what is shared and distinctive about each disorder.

On 25 November 2024, Bishop announced that she had resigned from the Royal Society because Elon Musk was also a member, and she no longer wanted to share this affiliation in view of his anti-scientific statements.

Bishop is also a Fellow of the British Academy (FBA) and a Fellow of the Academy of Medical Sciences (FMedSci). She has honorary degrees from Lund University, the University of Western Australia and Newcastle University.

Since 2022, the UK Reproducibility Information Network has hosted the annual "Dorothy Bishop Award", to recognise and reward the achievements of early career researchers based in the UK who are improving research and open research practices. The award includes a small financial contribution and also what they call a "Doscar", which is a Lego minifigure of Dorothy Bishop.

== Personal life ==
Bishop married fellow psychologist Patrick Rabbitt in 1976. As "Deevy Bishop", Bishop has written several humorous crime novels for Amazon Kindle.

== Links ==
- Her academic ORCID: 0000-0002-2448-4033
- Her blog, BishopBlog, received the runner up recognition for the Good Thinking Society: UK Science Blog Prize 2012.
