= Silent reading =

Reading without speaking aloud

Silent reading is reading done silently, or without speaking the words being read.

Before the reintroduction of separated text (spaces between words) in the Late Middle Ages, the ability to read silently may have been considered rather remarkable, though some scholars object to this idea.

In contrast, reading aloud activates many more parts of the brain due to the dual-route of feedback when pronouncing and reading.

== History ==
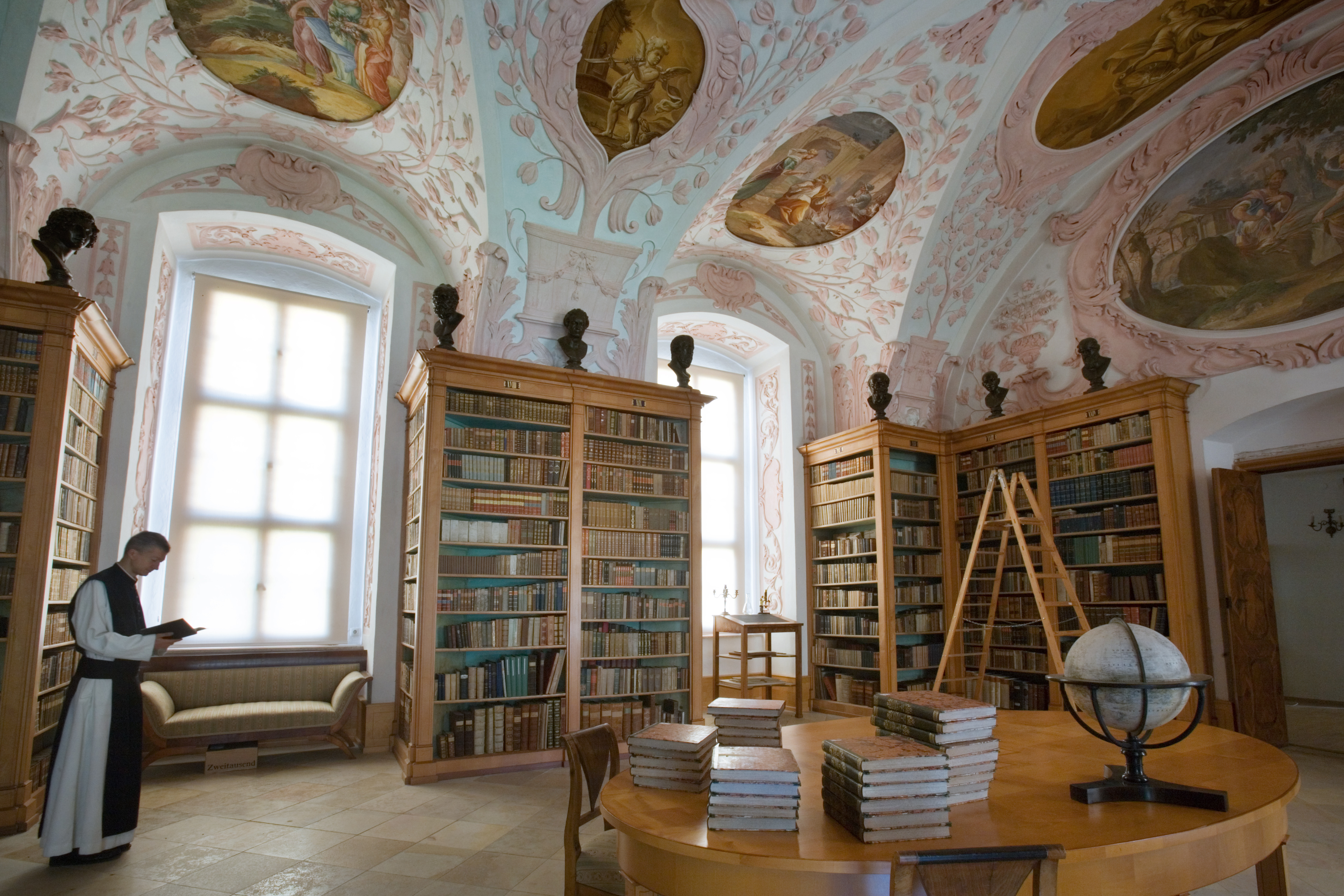
A Catholic monk reading in a monastery library

Scholars assume that reading aloud (Latin clare legere) was the more common practice in antiquity, and that reading silently (legere tacite or legere sibi) was unusual. In his Confessions, Saint Augustine remarks on Saint Ambrose's unusual habit of reading silently in the 4th century AD:

"When Ambrose read, his eyes ran over the columns of writing and his heart searched out the meaning, but his voice and his tongue were at rest. Often when I was present—for he did not close his door to anyone and it was customary to come in unannounced—I have seen him reading silently, never in fact otherwise."

However, another possible interpretation of this anecdote is that "what shocked Augustine was that Ambrose read silently in front of visitors and refused to share his reading matter, and his thoughts, with them."

In 18th-century Europe, the then new practice of reading alone in bed was, for a time, considered dangerous and immoral. As reading became less a communal, oral practice, and more a private, silent one – and as sleeping increasingly moved from communal sleeping areas to individual bedrooms, some raised concern that reading in bed presented various dangers, such as fires caused by bedside candles. Some modern critics, however, speculate that these concerns were based on the fear that readers – especially women – could escape familial and communal obligations and transgress moral boundaries through the private fantasy worlds in books.

== Eye movement and silent reading rate ==
Reading is an intensive process in which the eye quickly moves to assimilate the text – seeing just accurately enough to interpret groups of symbols. It is necessary to understand visual perception and eye movement in reading to understand the reading process.

When reading, the eye moves continuously along a line of text, but makes short rapid movements (saccades) intermingled with short stops (fixations). There is considerable variability in fixations (the point at which a saccade jumps to) and saccades between readers, and even for the same person reading a single passage of text. When reading, the eye has a perceptual span of about 20 slots. In the best-case scenario and reading English, when the eye is fixated on a letter, four to five letters to the right and three to four letters to the left can be clearly identified. Beyond that, only the general shape of some letters can be identified.

Research published in 2019 concluded that the silent reading rate of adults in English for non-fiction is in the range of 175 to 300 words per minute (wpm); and for fiction the range is 200 to 320 words per minute.

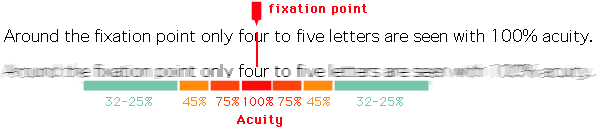
Eye fixation point

== Dual-route hypothesis to reading aloud ==
In the early 1970s, the dual-route hypothesis to reading aloud was proposed, according to which there are two separate mental mechanisms involved in reading aloud, with output from both contributing to the pronunciation of written words. One mechanism is the lexical route whereby skilled readers can recognize a word as part of their sight vocabulary. The other is the nonlexical or sublexical route, in which the reader "sounds out" (decodes) written words.

== Subvocalization ==
Subvocalization is the sense that a reader is combining silent reading with internal sounding of the words. Advocates of speed reading claim it can be a bad habit that slows reading and comprehension, but some researchers say this is a fallacy since there is no actual speaking involved. Instead, it may help skilled readers to read since they are using the phonological code to understand words (e.g., the difference between PERmit and perMIT).

== Use in education ==
In education, it has been criticized for not helping children who are not fluent in the language they are reading.

== Psychological effects ==
Reading aloud may have benefits compared to silent reading, such as improved memory or comprehension of material.

== See also ==
- Sustained silent reading
