= Patrick Rabbitt =

Professor Patrick Rabbitt
- Born: Patrick Michael Anthony Rabbitt; 23 September 1934 (age 92)
- Occupation: Psychologist

Patrick Michael Anthony Rabbitt (born 1934), also known as Pat, is an English psychologist who has specialised in researching the mental effects of aging — cognitive gerontology.

Rabbitt was born on 23 September 1934, to Edna Maude, née Smith, and Joseph Bernard Rabbitt, and educated at Queens' College, Cambridge.

He worked as a research student at the University of Cambridge, under Donald Broadbent, and in 1961 moved to the Applied Psychology Unit, where he undertook projects at the behest of the General Post Office.

He subsequently worked for the University of Oxford as a lecturer in psychology (1968-1982); the University of Durham as Professor of Psychology and head of department in (1982-1983); and the University of Manchester, in the Research Chair in Gerontology and Cognitive Psychology and Director of the Age and Cognitive Performance Research Centre (1983-2004).

He subsequently took up a position at the Department of Experimental Psychology, University of Oxford.

Rabbitt is married to Dorothy Bishop, also a noted psychologist.

The 2012 book, Measuring the mind's speed, control, and age is dedicated to him.
