= Dual-route hypothesis to reading aloud =

Theory of two separate mental mechanisms

The dual-route theory of reading aloud was first described in the early 1970s. This theory suggests that two separate mental mechanisms, or cognitive routes, are involved in reading aloud, with output of both mechanisms contributing to the pronunciation of a written stimulus.

== Routes ==
=== Lexical route ===
The lexical route is the process whereby skilled readers can recognize known words by sight alone, through a "dictionary" lookup procedure. According to this model, every word a reader has learned is represented in a mental database of words and their pronunciations that resembles a dictionary, or internal lexicon. When a skilled reader sees and visually recognizes a written word, they are then able to access the dictionary entry for the word and retrieve the information about its pronunciation. The internal lexicon encompasses every learned word, even exception words like 'colonel' or 'pint' that don't follow letter-to-sound rules. This route doesn't enable reading of nonwords (e.g. 'zuce'), though some phonological output can still be produced by matching the word to an approximation in the lexicon (e.g. 'sare' activating visually similar known words like 'care' or 'sore'). There is still no conclusive evidence whether the lexical route functions as a direct pathway going from visual word recognition straight to speech production, or a less direct pathway going from visual word recognition to semantic processing and finally to speech production.

=== Nonlexical or sublexical route ===
The nonlexical or sublexical route, on the other hand, is the process whereby the reader can "sound out" a written word. This is done by identifying the word's constituent parts (letters, phonemes, graphemes), and then applying knowledge of how these parts are associated with each other, for example how a string of neighboring letters sound together. This mechanism can be thought of as a letter-sound rule system that allows the reader to actively build a phonological representation and read the word aloud. The nonlexical route allows the correct reading of nonwords as well as regular words that follow spelling-sound rules, but not exception words. The dual-route hypothesis of reading has helped researchers explain and understand various facts about normal and abnormal reading.

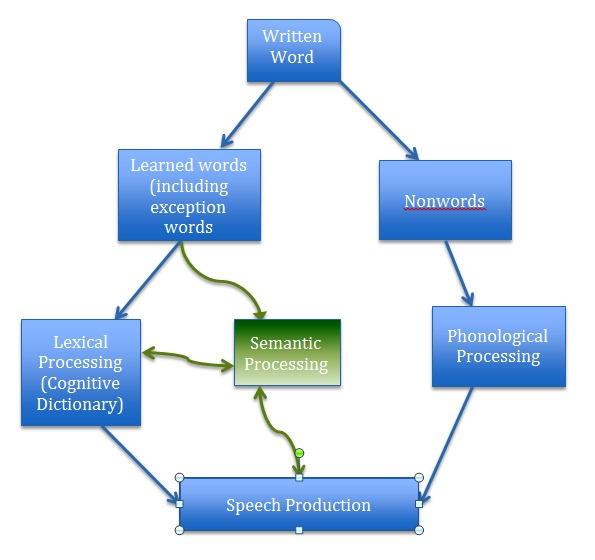
The mechanisms involved in dual-route processing, moving from the recognition of a written word to speech production.

== Transparency of phonological rules ==
According to research, the amount of time required to master reading depends on the language's adherence to phonological rules. A written language is described as transparent when it strongly adheres to spelling-sound rules and contains few exception words. Because of this, the English language (low transparency) is considered less transparent than French (medium transparency) and Spanish (high transparency) which contain more consistent grapheme-phoneme mappings. This difference explains why it takes more time for children to learn to read English, due to its frequent irregular orthography, compared to French and Spanish. The Spanish language's reliance on phonological rules can account for the fact that Spanish-speaking children exhibit a higher level of performance in nonword reading, compared to English and French-speaking children. Similarly, Spanish surface dyslexics exhibit less impairment in reading overall, because they can rely upon consistent pronunciation rules instead of processing many exception words as a whole in the internal lexicon. The dual-route system thus provides an explanation for the differences in reading acquisition rates as well as dyslexia rates between different languages.

== Reading speed ==
Skilled readers demonstrate longer reaction times when reading aloud irregular words that do not follow spelling-sound rules compared with regular words. When an irregular word is presented, both the lexical and nonlexical pathways are activated but they generate conflicting information that takes time to be resolved. The decision-making process that appears to take place indicates that the two routes are not entirely independent from one another. This data further explains why regular words, that both follow spelling-sound rules and have been stored in long-term memory, are read faster since both pathways "agree" about the issue of pronunciation.

== Attentional demands of each route ==
According to the current model of dual-route processing, each of the two pathways consumes different amounts of limited attentional resources. The nonlexical pathway is thought to be more active and constructive as it assembles and selects the correct subword units from various potential combinations. For example, when reading the word "leaf", that its spelling adheres to sound rules, the reader must assemble and recognize the two-letter grapheme "ea" in order to produce the sound "ee" that corresponds to it. It engages in controlled processing and thus requires more attentional capacities, which can vary in amount depending on the complexity of the words being assembled. On the other hand, the processing that takes place in the lexical pathway appears to be more automatic, since the word-sound units in it are pre-assembled. Lexical processing is thus considered to be more passive, consuming less attentional resources.

== Reading disorders ==
The dual-route hypothesis to reading can help explain patterns of data connected to certain types of disordered reading, both developmental and acquired.

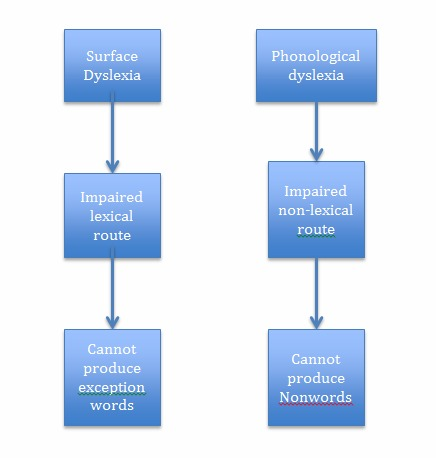
Routes impaired in surface and phonological dyslexia

Children with reading disorders rely primarily on the sub-lexical route while reading. Research shows that children can decode non-words, letter by letter, accurately but with slow speed. However, in decision tasks, they have trouble differentiating between words and pseudohomophones (non words that sound like real words but are incorrectly spelled), thereby showing that they had impaired internal lexicons. Because children with reading disorders (RD) have both slow reading speeds and impaired lexical routes, there are suggestions that the same processes are involved in lexical route and fast naming of words. Other studies have also confirmed this idea that rapid naming of words is more strongly correlated with orthographical knowledge (lexical route) than with phonological representations (sub-lexical route). Similar results were observed for patients with ADHD. Research concludes that reading disorders and ADHD have common properties: lexical route processing, rapid reading and sublexical route processing deficits as well.

=== Acquired surface dyslexia ===
Surface dyslexia, first described by Marshall and Newcombe, is characterized by the inability to read words that do not follow traditional pronunciation rules. English is also an example of a language that has numerous exceptions to the rules of pronunciation and thus presents a particular challenge to those with surface dyslexia. Patients with surface dyslexia may fail to read such words as "yacht", or "island" for example, because they do not follow prescribed rules of pronunciation. The words will typically be sounded out using "regularizations", such as pronouncing "colonel" as "Kollonel". Words like "state", and "abdominal", are examples of words that people with surface dyslexia will not have a problem pronouncing, as they do follow proscribed pronunciation rules. Surface dyslexics will read some irregular words correctly if they are high frequency words such as "have" and "some". It has been postulated that surface dyslexics are able to read regular words by retrieving the pronunciation through semantic means.

Surface dyslexia is also semantically mediated, meaning that there is a relationship between the word and its meaning and not just the mechanisms in how it is pronounced. People with surface dyslexia also have the ability to read words and non-words alike. This means the physical production of phonological sounds is not affected by surface dyslexia.

The mechanism behind surface dyslexia is thought to be involved with the phonologic output of the lexicon and is also often attributed to the disruption of semantics. It is also hypothesized that three deficits cause surface dyslexia. The first deficit is at the visual level in recognizing and processing the irregular word. The second deficit may be located at the level of the output lexicon. This is because patients are able to recognize the semantic meaning of irregular words even if they pronounce them incorrectly in spoken word. This suggests the visual word form system and semantics are relatively preserved. The third deficit is likely related to semantic loss.

While surface dyslexia can be observed in patients with lesions in their temporal lobe, it is primarily associated with patients who have dementias, such as Alzheimer's or frontotemporal dementia. Surface dyslexia is also a characteristic of semantic dementia, in which subjects lose knowledge of the world around them.

Treatments for surface dyslexia involves neuropsychological rehabilitation. The aim of the treatment is to improve the operation of the sub-lexical reading route, or the patient's ability to sound out new words. As well as the operation of the visual word recognition system, to increase the recognition of words. On a more micro level, treatment can also focus on the ability to sound out individual letters before the patient goes on to increasing the ability to sound out entire words.

=== Acquired phonological dyslexia ===
Acquired phonological dyslexia is a type of dyslexia that results in an inability to read nonwords aloud and to identify the sounds of single letters. However, patients with this disability can holistically read and correctly pronounce words, regardless of length, meaning, or how common they are, as long as they are stored in memory. This type of dyslexia is thought to be caused by damage in the nonlexical route, while the lexical route, that allows reading familiar words, remains intact.

== Computational modeling of the dual-route process ==
A computational model of a cognitive task is essentially a computer program that aims to mimic human cognitive processing. This type of model helps bring out the precise parts of a theory and disregards the ambiguous sections, as only the clearly understood parts of the theory can be converted into a computer program. The ultimate goal of a computational model is to resemble human behavior as closely as possible, such that factors affecting the functioning of the program would similarly affect human behavior and vice versa. Reading is an area that has been extensively studied via the computational model system. The dual-route cascaded model (DRC) was developed to understand the dual-route to reading in humans. Some commonalities between human reading and the DRC model are:

- Frequently occurring words are read aloud faster than non-frequently occurring words.
- Actual words are read faster than non-words.
- Standard sounding words are read aloud faster than irregular sounding words.

The DRC model has been useful as it was also made to mimic dyslexia. Surface dyslexia was imitated by damaging the orthographic lexicon so that the program made more errors on irregular words than on regular or non-words, just as is observed in surface dyslexia. Phonological dyslexia was similarly modeled by selectively damaging the non-lexical route thereby causing the program to mispronounce non words. As with any model, the DRC model has some limitations and a newer version is currently being developed.
