= Paralexia =

Reading disability

Paralexia is a reduction in reading ability characterized by the transposition or supplementation of words or syllables. It is usually an acquired condition associated with brain injury, such as alexia or acquired dyslexia, for example, as the result of a stroke.

There are several types of paralexias depending on the type of reading errors: orthographic paralexias, semantic paralexias, inflectional and derivational paralexias, function word substitutions, regularization errors, and orthographic-then-semantic paralexias.
