= Surface dyslexia =

Type of reading disorder

- Specialty: Pediatrics
- Symptoms: cannot recognize a word as a whole and retrieve its pronunciation from memory.
- Causes: damage of the left parietal or temporal lobe.

Surface dyslexia is a type of dyslexia, or reading disorder. According to Marshall & Newcombe's (1973) and McCarthy & Warrington's study (1990), patients with this kind of disorder cannot recognize a word as a whole due to the damage of the left parietal or temporal lobe. Individuals with surface dyslexia are unable to recognize a word as a whole word and retrieve its pronunciation from memory. Rather, individuals with surface dyslexia rely on pronunciation rules. Thus, patients with this particular type of reading disorder read non-words fluently, like "yatchet", but struggle with words that defy pronunciation rules (i.e. exception words). For example, a patient with surface dyslexia can correctly read regular words like "mint", but will fail when presented with a word that disobeys typical pronunciation rules, like "pint". Often, semantic knowledge is preserved in individuals with surface dyslexia.

== The dual route theory of reading ==
The dual route theory of reading proposes that skilled readers use two mechanisms when converting written language to spoken language: the direct, lexical pathway and the indirect, non-lexical pathway. According to the dual route theory of reading, in individuals with surface dyslexia, the indirect (non-lexical) pathway is preserved. However, the direct (lexical) pathway of reading is not. The indirect pathway of reading allows individuals with surface dyslexia to read regular words that follow a letter-sound or grapheme-to-phoneme conversion. The absence of an intact direct pathway of reading leads individuals with surface dyslexia to incorrectly identify and pronounce irregular words.

== Treatment ==
Some studies have demonstrated improvements in reading and spelling performance of individual children with surface dyslexia. Many of the interventions that exist are based on the dual route model of reading and use a targeted approach based on the individual assessment results.

Case studies conducted by Law and Cupples (2015) recommend first identifying specific oral reading difficulties experienced by the individual with surface dyslexia and based on the reading patterns identified designing a theoretically motivated and targeted treatment program. One of the interventions involved targeting visual-orthographic processing by increasing the efficiency by which surface dyslexics identified nonwords. The second intervention involved training in the identification and decoding of common letter patterns in irregular words.

== See also ==
- Aphasia
- Agnosia
