= Kairouani calligraphy =

Islamic calligraphy style

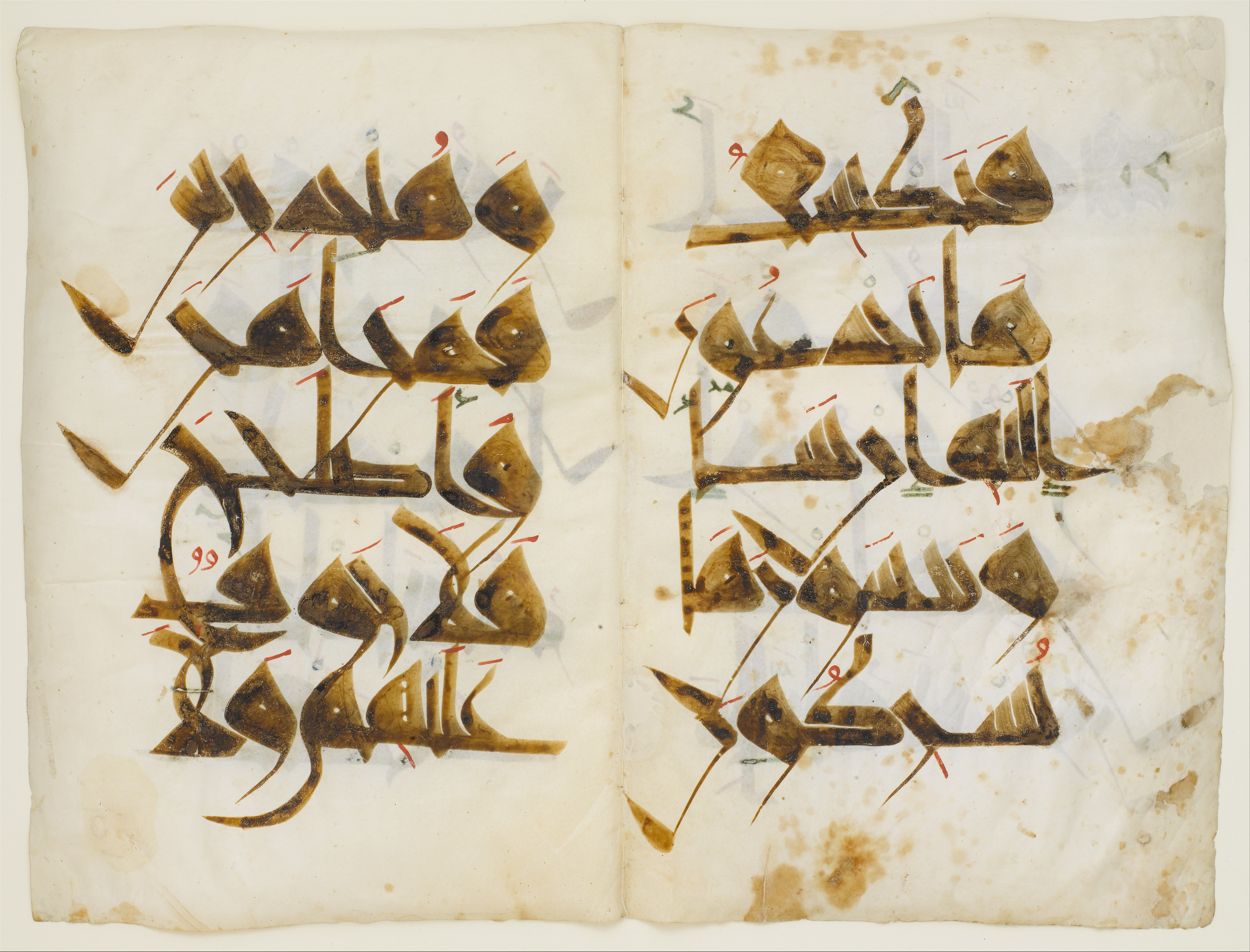
A page from the Nurse's Quran, written in Kairouani style.

Kairouani style (Arabic: الخط القيرواني), or Kairouani Kufi style calligraphy (الخط الكوفي القيرواني), is one style of Islamic calligraphy.

== History ==
=== The Nurse's Quran (Mushaf al-Hadina) ===
Kairouani style was used for the first time in the Nurse's Quran, finished in 1020 during the last decades of Kairouan’s intellectual and political golden era. The manuscript was kept for centuries in the maqsurah of Ibn Badis, a small cell measuring 8x6 meters next to the qibla wall that served as a library, in the main prayer room of the Great Mosque.

The Nurse's Quran was discovered after the publication of an article in an Egyptian journal in 1897 criticizing the conservation of the collections of the Great Mosque of Kairouan. Later in 1948, the French archaeologist Louis Poinsot conducted deeper research on the manuscripts. He disassembled them and took their bindings to the Bardo National Museum leaving the parchments separated, and classified by size and condition.

According to a tahbiss describing the people engaged in the manuscript's creation, the chief of the scriptorium, Ali Ibn Ahmed al-Warraq, and Fatimah Hadhinah, the Zirid prince's nurse, commissioned the creation of the manuscript for the Great Mosque. Additionally, according to some historians, Dora Al Katibah, a second woman was the boss's secretary or a scribe. This Quran was later donated to enrich the library of the great mosque as part of a political strategy endorsed by the Qadi of Kairouan, Abdallah Ben Hachem.

In the Quran of the Fadhel, one of the sentences of a colophon confirms that the book was written by women ‘’she wrote it with her hands”.

Besides this, another trace of the Nurse’s Quran can be found in the mediaeval inventory set in 1294 by a scribe called Al Khalidini. According to this inventory, the manuscript is just an element of a 125 religious manuscripts collection, 65 of which are Qurans. This document gave a legal status to the manuscript as a protected item of the library.

“ And a Khitmah of Qur’an in sixty juz’, of big format, with a Kufic Rayhani script, five lines, on parchment. Each juz’ of it has a gilded opening, surah headings and hizb markers and tenth’s markers. Some of them are gilded in their closing. Vocalizations are in red, green and azure. Some of them are covered in leather on wood, others in silk on leather on wood, and some in silk on wood. All of them have lost their ornamentation. This is how the description of this Khitmah appears in the Sigill cited20, and this is how it appears now, with its bindings destroyed.”

According to the national institute of heritage, the book is divided into 60 hizbs with over 2900 folios of parchment in total. The page measure 44,5x30cm and contain five lines (6 cm high) each. These leaves are currently exposed in different museums of the world such as the Metropolitan Museum in New York, The David Collection in Copenhagen and the Bardo Museum in Tunis. Yet, the most important part is preserved at the Musée national d'art islamique de Raqqada.

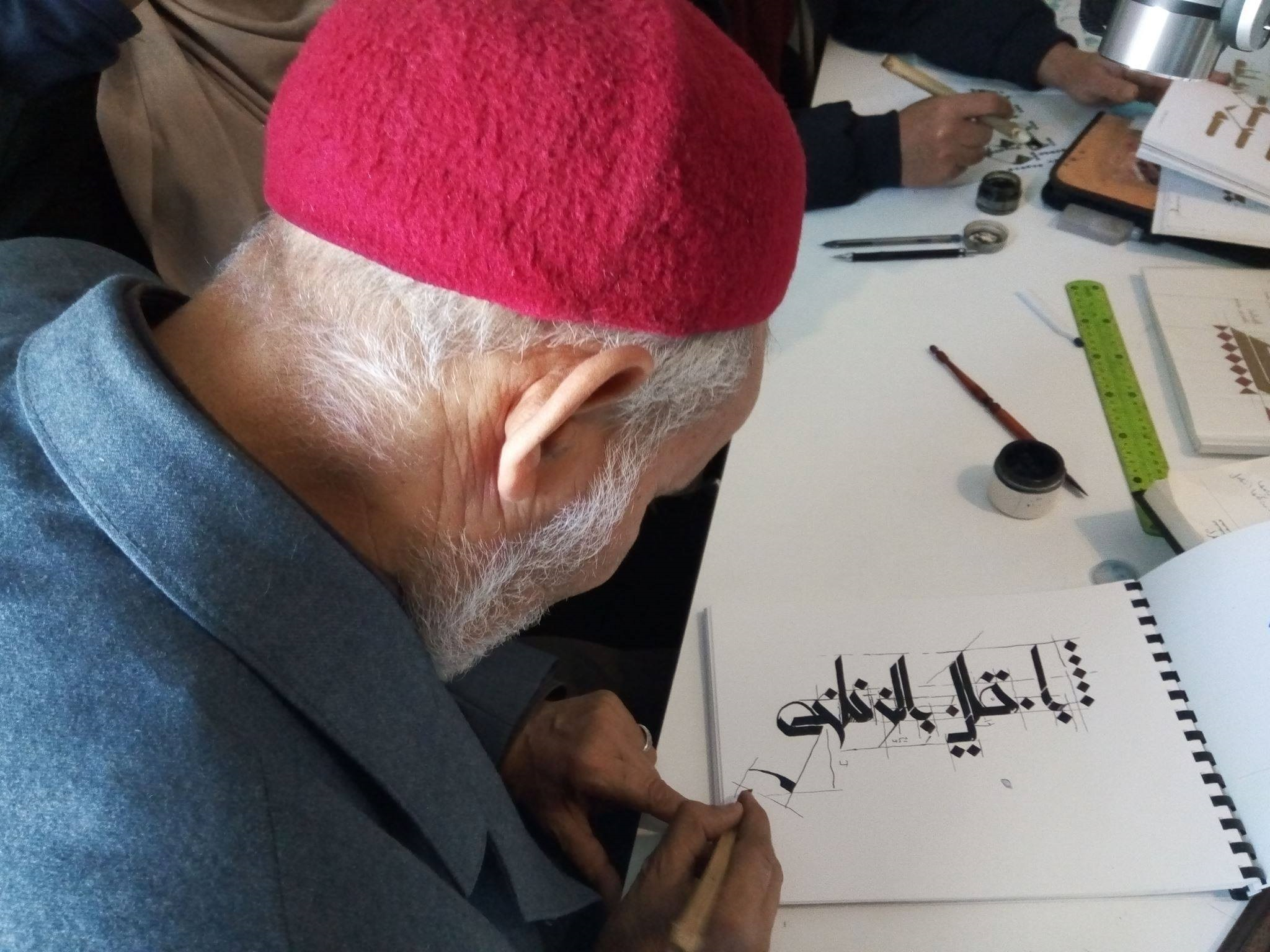
Kairouani calligrapher holding a training session

=== Evolution ===
The Kairouani style remained very discrete and very few examples where it was is used during the same period as Quran of the Nurse were found. Among these examples, we can mention a small travel pocket Quran written on parchment dating from the 10th century.

By the 11th century, the presence of Kairouani calligraphy started to decline with the arrival of the andalu calligraphy. According to Ibn Khaldun, this style remained used only in the Djerid in the south ouest of Tunisia as this region is very far geographically from the influence of andalu culture.

In 2017, The Tunisian Association for the Art of Calligraphy conducted a research on the script and introduced it in its curriculum. In partnership with some other private institutions and associations, the calligraphers gave courses for the local community of the medina and all people interested to learn the basics of Kairouani script.

The fifth edition of Tunisian Calligraphy 2017 was dedicated to the Kairouani style, and as a way to emphasize on its importance, many Tunisian calligraphy masters presented paintings featuring the Kairouani script such as Alhassoumi Zitoun, Najet Ennouri and Zouhour Arfaoui.

In 2018, the script got digitalized and a digital typo that can be used on any Microsoft Word-based processing software became available for download.

== Description ==
In general, the letters in Kairouani style are bold and angular. They are not dotted, and well seated on a horizontal line. Vertical letters like aleph (ا) and lam (ل) are perfectly perpendicular, with the first aleph always distinguished with an extra lower tail finishing horizantally to the right to Kufic styles in general. On the other hand, low letters such as beh (ب) or shin (س), are characterized by their parallel and closely grouped short dents. Finally, for some other letters that have bulbs like the dal (ض) or the kef (ك) a mashq (a second upper horizontal line or a rectangle) is added and stretched horizontally proportionally to the left space and the length of the word to make it first in the line. Final characteristic is that words do not split and verse markers are absent.

== See also ==
- Kufic Calligraphy
- Naskh
