= John C. Marshall (neuropsychologist) =

John Charles Marshall
- Born: 1939
- Died: 2007 (aged 67–68)
- Known for: Modeling of language disorders and dyslexia
- Scientific career
- Fields: Cognitive neuropsychology
- Workplaces: University of Oxford

John Charles Marshall (1939 – 2007) was a British cognitive neuropsychologist, who played a pioneering role in the establishment of cognitive neuropsychology as a discipline, and in modeling of language disorders and dyslexia. He emphasized the role of representation in understanding the mind, stating, for instance, that "the primary goal of neurolinguistics can be simply stated: the discipline seeks to understand the form of representation of language in the human brain" (1977 p. 127).

He pioneered cognitive models of the understanding of neuropsychiatric disorders.
