= Right to Read inquiry report =

2022 report on Ontario public inquiry into reading

On January 27, 2022, the Ontario Human Rights Commission (OHRC) released a report on its public inquiry entitled Right to Read inquiry report (R2R), compiled with the assistance of Linda Siegel and Jamie Metsala. It followed the unanimous decision of the Supreme Court of Canada, on November 9, 2012, recognizing that learning to read is not a privilege, but a basic and essential human right.

The R2R inquiry found that Ontario's education system is not fulfilling its obligations to meet students' right to read. Only about 5% of students should be reading below grade level if they are taught with science-based approaches and receive early screening and intervention. However, in 2018–2019, 26% of all Ontario Grade 3 students and 53% students with special education needs, were not meeting the provincial standard. In the Grade 3 English language system, 47% of First Nations, 39% of Métis, and 52% of Inuit students did not meet the provincial standard. Students in the French-language system fared better.

In addition, the Toronto District School Board reported that some groups of students experience significantly lower achievement in reading (e.g., from "low socioeconomic status; Black, Latin American and Middle Eastern; the English-speaking Caribbean; with special education needs; male; and not sure of or questioning their sexual orientation").

The Ontario curriculum, at the time of the inquiry, encouraged the use of the three-cueing system and balanced literacy, which are ineffective because they teach children to "guess" the meaning of a word rather than sound it out. (Note: Sources:) (Note: Sources:) In the opinion of the report, what is required is evidence-based curriculum and instruction. (Note: Sources:)

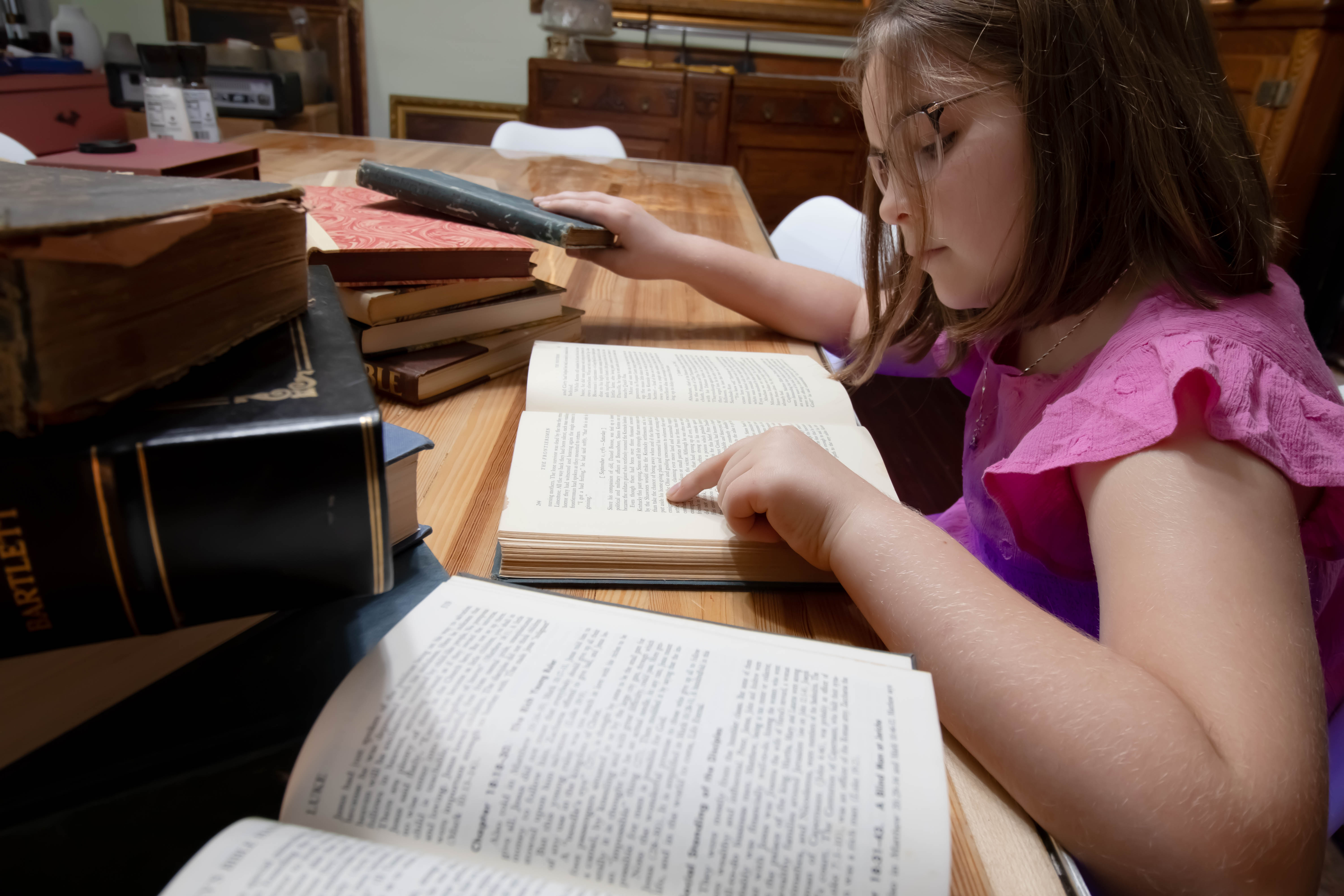
Reading for life

== Overview ==
Reading disabilities, such as Dyslexia, are the most common disabilities in schools. (Note: Sources:) They may affect academic achievement, employment, family finances, homelessness, involvement in crime, substance abuse, mental and physical health (Note: Sources:), and more. Yet, these disabilities can be prevented for almost all students if the education system is functioning as it should. (Note: Sources:)

Teaching students foundational word-reading skills requires attention to early screening, professional assessments, curriculum and instruction, reading interventions, and appropriate accommodations.

== Notable mentions ==
The Ontario Human Rights Commission Right to Read inquiry report has been reviewed in the following journals:

- Journal of Teaching and Learning
- The Canadian Journal of Disability Studies
- Education Sciences
- Paediatrics & Child Health

== Contents ==
The report has conclusions and recommendations in the following areas:

=== Curriculum and instruction ===
The report says that the most effective way to teach all students to read words is through direct, explicit, and systematic instruction in "foundational word-reading skills", including phonemic awareness and phonics. The Ontario school system, at the time of the report, did not offer this; instead, it includes methods such as the three-cueing system and balanced literacy. The report says that teachers need to be trained in evidence-based instruction methods. It concludes that Structured literacy is the most effective way to teach early reading. A meta analysis in 2024 reported that "Structured literacy programs, were especially superior over the long term, compared to balanced literacy, with a mean difference in effect sizes of .28". (Note: Sources:)

=== Early screening ===
The report recommends standardized evidence-based screening on foundational skills, focusing on word-reading accuracy and fluency. (Note: Sources:)

=== Reading interventions ===
The report recommends that the education system should provide early and tiered, evidence-based interventions in kindergarten and the first or second grade, and these interventions need to be monitored and evaluated.

=== Accommodations ===
According to the report, "Schools must provide accommodations alongside evidence-based curriculum and intervention strategies." When instruction is systematic and explicit, and supplemented with evidence-based interventions, fewer students will need accommodations. However, when required, accommodations should be timely, effective, and supported.

=== Assessments ===
The report concluded that, with effective instruction, fewer students will require professional assessments. Furthermore, school boards should have clear, transparent, written criteria and processes for referring students with suspected reading disabilities, and these processes should be implemented in a timely manner. Professional assessments should also be available for all students, regardless of their parents' ability to pay.

=== Systemic issues ===
The report recommends that the Ministry of Education and school boards set standards and ensure consistency, monitoring, and accountability in the education system generally, and for students with disabilities.

The report contains 157 recommendations.

== Reception ==
- The Minister of Education for Ontario responded to this report by saying the government is taking immediate action to create a plan that includes "revising the elementary Language curriculum and the Grade 9 English course with scientific, evidence-based approaches that emphasize direct, explicit and systematic instruction, and removing references to unscientific discovery and inquiry-based learning, including the three-cueing system, by 2023." The province's curriculum refers to the report. It specifies that the curriculum employs "evidence-based approaches" to systematically and explicitly teach students how to read.
- Some academics, such as Shelley Stagg Peterson of the University of Toronto, say "the inquiry's recommendations are limited to narrow, rigidly defined perspectives of reading and ways to support students with reading disabilities", and that "widespread generalizing of the recommendations to the diverse classrooms across Ontario will be problematic".
- CBC News reported that some parents are eager to see changes.
- CBC's radio program, The Current, reported that some provinces may change their curriculum as a result of the report.
- The Ontario Psychological Association (OPA) responded to the report on April 30, 2022. It agrees with the emphasis on providing scientific, evidence-based tier 1 and tier 2 reading instruction as this will prevent reading difficulties in later years, and may lead to a decrease in wait-time for those students who need an assessment. However, it raises some concerns about the suggestion that the Guidelines for Diagnosis and Assessment of Learning Disabilities be updated to align with DSM-5.
- Several District School Boards responded by stating their intention to implement the report's recommendations.
- The Queen's University Gazette published their results of an interview with Pamela Beach, a professor in Queen’s Faculty of Education, about the OHRC report.
- The University of Western Ontario (Western University) appears to gave a mixed review of the report. One unsigned response states, "the vast majority of children in Ontario are well-served by public education". It also states that there is no single, agreed-upon approach to support children who struggle with reading and that "systematic phonics should be one part of a repertoire of strategies." Furthermore, it objects to the removal of all references to "cueing systems" and suggests that a "balance of approaches" is the most effective way to teach reading. Nonetheless, it supports the inclusion of instruction in systematic phonics, together with instruction in oral language, reading comprehension, and writing. It also agrees with the report's recommendation to "set up an assessment and intervention infrastructure". In another posting from the Journal of Teaching and Learning, Dr. Perry Klein, PhD states that the criticism of the report is "misdirected." It goes on to say "The R2R Report moves Ontario into the 21st century by introducing a strong emphasis on research, a developmentally informed conception of learning disabilities, a focused approach to intervention, a valid and timely approach to assessment, and a contemporary framework for organizing inclusive literacy education". Subsequently, Jim Cummins gave a rebuttal to that comment on June 16, 2023. In yet another response, four members of The Western University's Centre for the Science of Learning, University of Western Ontario, offered its support of all the recommendations in the report and states "we urge Ontario's Ministry of Education to move quickly to implement the OHRC Right to Reading recommendations".
- The Learning Disabilities Association of Ontario responded to the report, stating that it supports the majority of the recommendations on early reading and all of its recommendations on equity in the current system.
- PooranLaw, in Ontario, Canada, released a review of the report and its recommendations on April 12, 2022.
- The Manitoba Council of Reading Clinicians gave its response to the report on JULY 4, 2023.
- A 2023 article in the Journal of Teaching and Learning (JTL) says that, in the view of its authors, the Right to Read Inquiry report "recommends a narrow course for reading interventions in Ontario" and considers current interventions, such as Reading Recovery, to be unscientific and ineffective. The two authors of the JTL article are former Reading Recovery teachers and are affiliated with the Canadian Institute of Reading Recovery in Ontario, Canada. They suggest that school leadership should consider the strengths of various approaches instead of narrowing the choice of effective literacy interventions. The authors then describe Reading Recovery and present their evidence of its efficacy.
- The Ontario teachers' perceptions of implementing the report's recommendations were revealed in an article in the journal Education Sciences. The discussion points involved professional development, barriers, facilitators, and ease of implementation. In particular, some teachers felt "overwhelmed and betrayed by the education sector" because they were trained in delivering a balanced literacy approach and their materials and curriculum are aligned to that approach. As a result, some are concerned about the professional development they will need to make the transition and the new resources required. There was also a perceived barrier in some teachers' beliefs; specifically, a "reluctance to change and not seeing the value of a structured literacy approach". Another significant concern was the number of current students who require extra support, which has "overwhelmed the system."
- The Canadian Journal of Disability Studies published two articles about the report. One of them, by Christine Caughill, attempts "to question the dominant narrative about dyslexia and disability ... and to question the power of science and medicine as the definitive perspectives on dyslexia and disability". The other one, by Natalie D.Riediger PhD, attempts to address the "misinterpretations made by Caughill" and to give more context to the discussion.
- As a result of the R2R report, the Ministry of Education, Government of Ontario, published Policy/Program Memorandum 168 on July 28, 2023, which provides direction to school boards of publicly funded schools to complete annual early reading screenings for all students in Year 2 of Kindergarten through Grade 2.
- The Paediatrics & Child Health journal published an article on December 30, 2024, entitled Literacy in school-aged children: A paediatric approach to advocacy and assessment. It mentions the inquiry report's 157 recommendations "to address inequities related to reading instruction in Ontario".
- The article was featured in educhatter on October 29, 2025.
- The Physicians of Ontario Neurodevelopmental Advocacy (PONDA) referenced the study in an article in 2025.

== Progress since the release of the report ==
The OHRC released a 2-Year Update. It reviews the status of recommendations and rates them on a scale of 1-10 according to the following:

Benchmark 1: Curriculum and Instruction, Benchmark 2: Universal Screening, Benchmark 3: Reading Interventions, Benchmark 4: Accommodations, Benchmark 5: Professional Assessments, and Addressing Systemic Issues

The Ontario Department of Education posted an online guide for 2020-2025 entitled Effective early reading instruction: a guide for teachers that includes examples of systematic and explicit instructional strategies in the areas of phonological awareness, phonemic awareness, alphabet knowledge, phonics, and word study.

== See also ==
- Evidence-based education
- Independent review of the teaching of early reading (Rose Report 2006)
- National Reading Panel
- Phonics
- Primary education
- Reading
- Reading comprehension
- Reading disability
- Reading for special needs
- Science of reading
- Simple view of reading
- Structured literacy
- Synthetic phonics
- Systematic phonics
