= Structured literacy =

System of teaching reading

Structured literacy (SL), according to the International Dyslexia Association (which coined the term), is the systematic teaching of reading that focuses on the following elements: (Note: Sources:)

- Phonology: the study of sounds in a particular language, and Phonemic awareness (the ability to recognize, segment, blend, and manipulate sounds)
- Sound-symbol association (also Phonics): using the Alphabetic principle to connect sounds (phonemes) to letters (graphemes)
- Syllables: a single unit of speech, in English usually containing a vowel (e.g., The word reading has two syllables, "read" and "ing".)
- Morphology: the study of the form of words and phrases, including morphemes, the smallest unit of meaning in a language (e.g., The word unbreakable has three morphemes, "un", "break", and "able".)
- Syntax: the grammatical arrangement of words in a sentence
- Semantics: the study of meaning in language

SL is taught using the following principles:

- Systematic: begin with the basic and easiest concepts and elements, and progress to the more difficult and complex
- Cumulative: each step builds on a previous step
- Explicit: direct teaching and continuous teacher-student interaction
- Multisensory: using different senses (e.g., visual, auditory, kinesthetic, and tactile) to enhance attention and memory
- Diagnostic: using informal and formal assessments to individualize instruction

The International Dyslexia Association provides a detailed outline of its Key Performance Standards of its Knowledge and Practice Standards for Teachers of Reading.

There is general agreement that SL is beneficial for all early literacy learners, especially those with reading disabilities such as dyslexia. (Note: Sources:) However, according to professor Mark Seidenberg, while SL is necessary for students with special needs (e.g., to overcome dyslexia), it may not be required for the general student population beyond the early literacy years. He suggests that teachers strike a balance between implicit instruction and explicit instruction, with explicit instruction for all students at the start, followed by implicit instruction for all students except dyslexics (who continue to receive explicit instruction as required). On the other hand, others worry that this approach could prompt educators "to abandon research-tested practices that are only just now securing a foothold in districts". And, still others suggest that one solution to differentiated instruction might be to utilize the "walk to read" approach.

Another example of using a structured approach to teach reading is the foundational-skills curriculum, UFLI Foundations, developed by researchers at the University of Florida Literacy Institute, part of the university's College of Education. Using this program, kindergarten and 1st-grade students progressed much faster in reading skills than students receiving business-as-usual instruction.

Dr. Jamie Metsala, co-author of the Right to Read inquiry report, believes that Structured Literacy may have an important impact on how literacy will be taught in Canada. In 2025-2026, schools in the provinces of Ontario, Nova Scotia, Alberta, and New Brunswick had plans to implement structured literacy. However, they may face many obstacles, including reluctant school boards and ministries of education, inadequate assessment tools, overlap with previous ineffective curricula, and a lack of training, support, and resources for teachers.

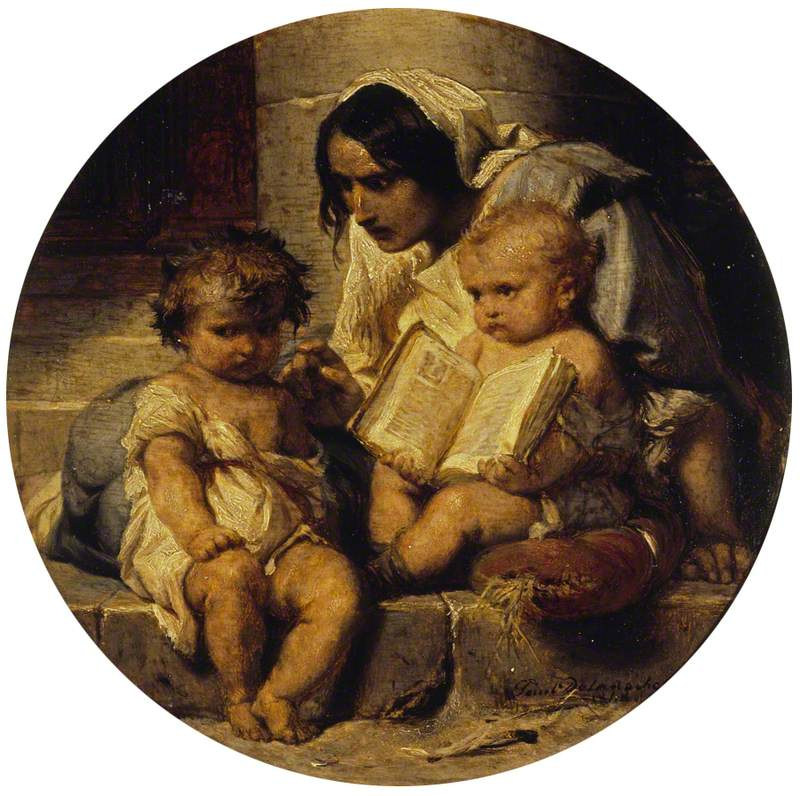
A Child Learning to Read, Paul Delaroche (1797–1856)

== Structured literacy vs. Balanced literacy ==
SL has many of the elements of systematic phonics and few of the elements of balanced literacy. The following is an explanation of how Structured literacy is different from Balanced literacy:

Feature	Structured literacy	Balanced literacy
Basis	Science of reading	Whole language
Areas covered	Phonology, phonemic awareness, sound-symbol association (phonics), syllables, morphology, syntax, and semantics	Learn from exposure, reading, instruction, and support in multiple environments
Teaching method	Direct, explicit, systematic, cumulative, and multisensory Mostly teacher-led (e.g., The teacher leads the students through decoding activities.) Lessons involve phonics and word reading, from easier to more difficult Corrective feedback: students are asked to "sound-out" the word	Implicit, constructivist, and less structured Often student-directed (e.g., independent learning, students choose reading material, etc.) Lessons relate to comprehension of books or literature themes. Corrective feedback: students are asked "does that make sense", and are told to check the cues (e.g., pictures, first letter, etc.)
Phonics	Taught via the alphabetic principle, systematically, including the most frequent phonemes (sounds) and graphemes (letters), beginning with the easiest and progressing to the more complex	Taught as needed via mini-lessons, or not at all
Text for reading instruction	Decodable text until grade 2	Leveled text, but not corresponding to phonics taught
Reading	decoding and sounding out words	read the whole word using cues (context, word analogies, and pictures) to guess the word
Effectiveness	a mean unweighted effect size of .47, and a fixed weighted mean effect size of .44. Structured literacy approaches "tend to yield larger positive effects on student learning compared to balanced literacy approaches". (meta-analysis 2024)	a mean unweighted effect size of .21, and a weighted mean effect size of .33.

== See also ==
- Evidence-based education
- Phonics
- Primary education
- Reading
- Reading comprehension
- Reading for special needs
- Right to Read inquiry report
- Science of reading
- Simple view of reading
- Systematic phonics
