= Reading disability =

Type of learning disability in which reading is impaired

A reading disability is a condition in which a person displays difficulty reading. Examples of reading disabilities include developmental dyslexia and alexia (acquired dyslexia).

== Definition ==
The National Institute of Neurological Disorders and Stroke defines reading disability or dyslexia as follows: "Dyslexia is a brain-based type of learning disability that specifically impairs a person's ability to read. These individuals typically read at levels significantly lower than expected despite having normal intelligence. Although the disorder varies from person to person, common characteristics among people with dyslexia are difficulty with spelling, phonological processing (the manipulation of sounds), and rapid visual-verbal responding. In adults, dyslexia usually occurs after a brain injury or in the context of dementia. It can also be inherited in some families, and recent studies have identified a number of genes that may predispose an individual to developing dyslexia." The NINDS definition is not in keeping with the bulk of scientific studies that conclude that there is no evidence to suggest that dyslexia and intelligence are related. Definition is more in keeping with modern research and debunked discrepancy model of dyslexia diagnosis:

- Dyslexia is a learning difficulty that primarily affects the skills involved in accurate and fluent word reading and spelling.
- Characteristic features of dyslexia are difficulties in phonological awareness, verbal memory and verbal processing speed.
- Dyslexia occurs across the range of intellectual abilities.
- It is best thought of as a continuum, not a distinct category, and there are no clear cut-off points.
- Co-occurring difficulties may be seen in aspects of language, motor coordination, mental calculation, concentration and personal organisation, but these are not, by themselves, markers of dyslexia.
- A good indication of the severity and persistence of dyslexic difficulties can be gained by examining how the individual responds or has responded to well-founded intervention.

== Types ==
=== Dyslexia ===
Dyslexia is a learning disability that manifests itself as a difficulty with word decoding and reading fluency. Comprehension may be affected as a result of difficulties with decoding, but is not a primary feature of dyslexia. It is separate and distinct from reading difficulties resulting from other causes, such as a non-neurological deficiency with vision or hearing, or from poor or inadequate reading instruction. It is estimated that dyslexia affects between 5–17% of the population. Dyslexia has been proposed to have three cognitive subtypes (auditory, visual and attentional), although individual cases of dyslexia are better explained by the underlying neuropsychological deficits and co-occurring learning disabilities (e.g. attention-deficit/hyperactivity disorder, math disability, etc.). Although not an intellectual disability, it is considered both a learning disability and a reading disability. Dyslexia and IQ are not interrelated, since reading and cognition develop independently in individuals who have dyslexia. "Nerve problems can cause damage to the control of eye muscles which can also cause diplopia."

Students with dyslexia require a tailored approach in writing courses due to the impact of their neurological condition on their reading, writing, and spelling abilities. This approach is intended to aid their learning and maximize their potential. The incorporation of inclusive writing practices within the curriculum allows students with dyslexia to achieve a parallel education as their peers who do not have dyslexia or other reading disabilities. These practices provide effective strategies for writing courses to cater to the unique needs of students with dyslexia. For instance, John Corrigan, a graduate student with dyslexia, indicates that "the best method is one-on-one [assistance]" from professors or teachers in order to elevate the students' comprehension and strengthen their abilities in the classroom. Additionally, Corrigan states that the incorporation of audible text options are beneficial to students who are developing their writing skills. Corrigan's claim also implies that recorded lectures or self-recording class materials would serve a student with dyslexia. Sioned Exley's study concluded that an alternative approach to implementing inclusive writing practices is through kinesthetic teaching. Exley argues that a student with dyslexia may understand material through visual learning opposed to auditory engagement, as auditory processing tends to be a compromised ability in many people with dyslexia. Implementing inclusive writing practices in the education system, specifically targeting youth education, will pave a route for increased higher-level educational opportunities for individuals with dyslexia in their adult years.

=== Hyperlexia ===
Hyperlexic children are characterized by word-reading ability well above what would be expected given their ages and IQs. Hyperlexia can be viewed as a superability in which word recognition ability goes far above expected levels of skill. However, in spite of few problems with decoding, comprehension is poor. Some hyperlexics also have trouble understanding speech. Most children with hyperlexia lie on the autism spectrum. Between 5–10% of autistic children have been estimated to be hyperlexic.

== Remediation ==
Remediation includes both appropriate remedial instruction and classroom accommodations.

== Related concepts ==
=== Reading rate ===
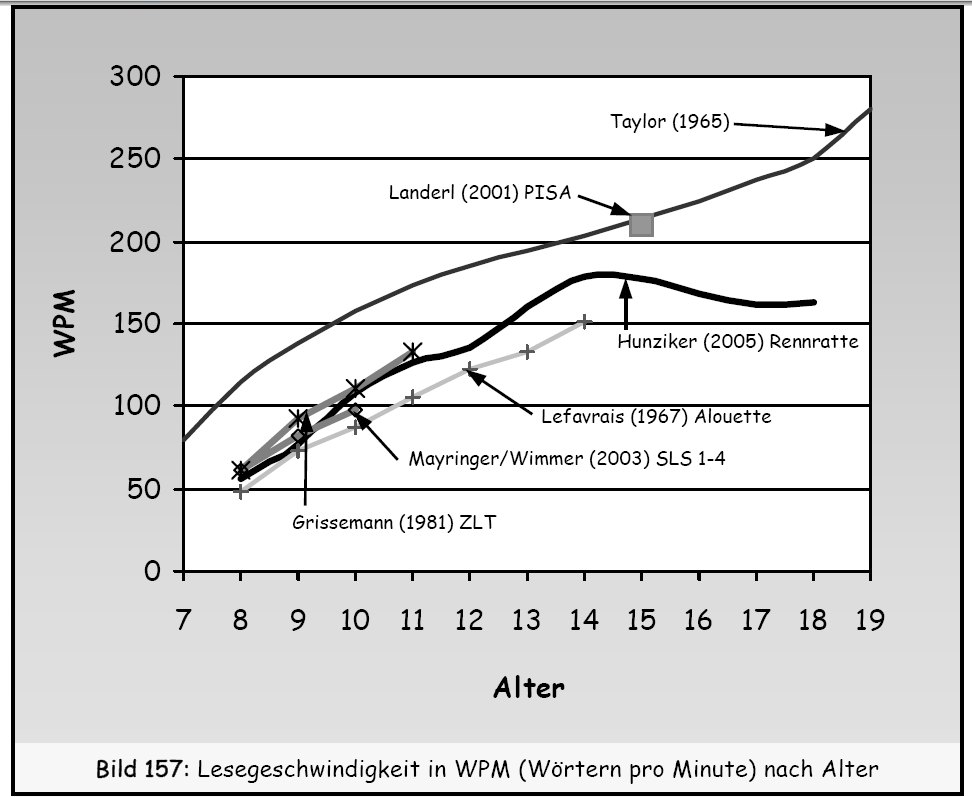
Average reading rate in words per minute (wpm) depending on age and measured with different tests in English, French and German

Individuals with reading rate difficulties tend to have accurate word recognition and normal comprehension abilities, but their reading speed is below grade level. Strategies such as guided reading (guided, repeated oral-reading instruction), may help improve a reader's reading rate.

Many studies show that increasing reading speed improves comprehension. Reading speed requires a long time to reach adult levels. According to Carver (1990), children's reading speed increases throughout the school years. On average, from grade 2 to college, the reading rate increases 14 standard-length words per minute each year (where one standard-length word is defined as six characters in text, including punctuation and spaces).

Scientific studies have demonstrated that speed reading – defined here as capturing and decoding words faster than 900 wpm – is not feasible given the limits set by the anatomy of the eye.

=== Reading fluency ===
Individuals with reading fluency difficulties fail to maintain a fluid, smooth pace when reading. Strategies used for overcoming reading rate difficulties are also useful in addressing reading fluency issues.

=== Reading comprehension ===
Individuals with reading comprehension difficulties are commonly described as poor comprehenders. They have normal decoding skills as well as a fluid rate of reading, but have difficulty comprehending text when reading. The simple view of reading holds that reading comprehension requires both decoding skills and oral language comprehension ability.

Increasing vocabulary knowledge, listening skills, and teaching basic comprehension techniques may help facilitate better reading comprehension. It is suggested that students receive brief, explicit instruction in reading comprehension strategies in the areas of vocabulary, noticing understanding, and connecting ideas.

Scarborough's Reading Rope and The active view of reading model also outline some of the essential ingredients of reading comprehension.

=== Radio reading service ===
In some countries, a radio reading service provides a service for blind people and others who choose to hear newspapers, books, and other printed material read aloud, typically by volunteers. An example is Australia's Radio Print Handicapped Network with stations in capital cities and some other areas.

== See also ==
- Attention deficit hyperactivity disorder
- Aphasia
- Auditory processing disorder
- Developmental coordination disorder
- Dyscalculia
- Dysgraphia
- Orthography
- Reading
- Reading for special needs
- Scotopic sensitivity syndrome (also called Irlen Syndrome)
- Specific language impairment
