= Reading =

Taking in the meaning of letters or symbols

Reading is the process of taking in the sense or meaning of the symbols of written language, by means of sight (or, in some cases, touch). The ability to read (and write) is called literacy.

For educators and researchers, reading is a multifaceted process involving such areas as word recognition, orthography (spelling), punctuation, alphabetics, phonics, phonemic awareness, vocabulary, comprehension, fluency, and motivation.

Other types of reading and writing, such as pictograms (e.g., a hazard symbol or an emoji), are not based on speech-based writing systems. The common link is the interpretation of symbols to extract the meaning from the visual notations or tactile signals (e.g., braille).

There is a growing body of evidence which illustrates the importance of reading for pleasure for both educational purposes as well as personal development.

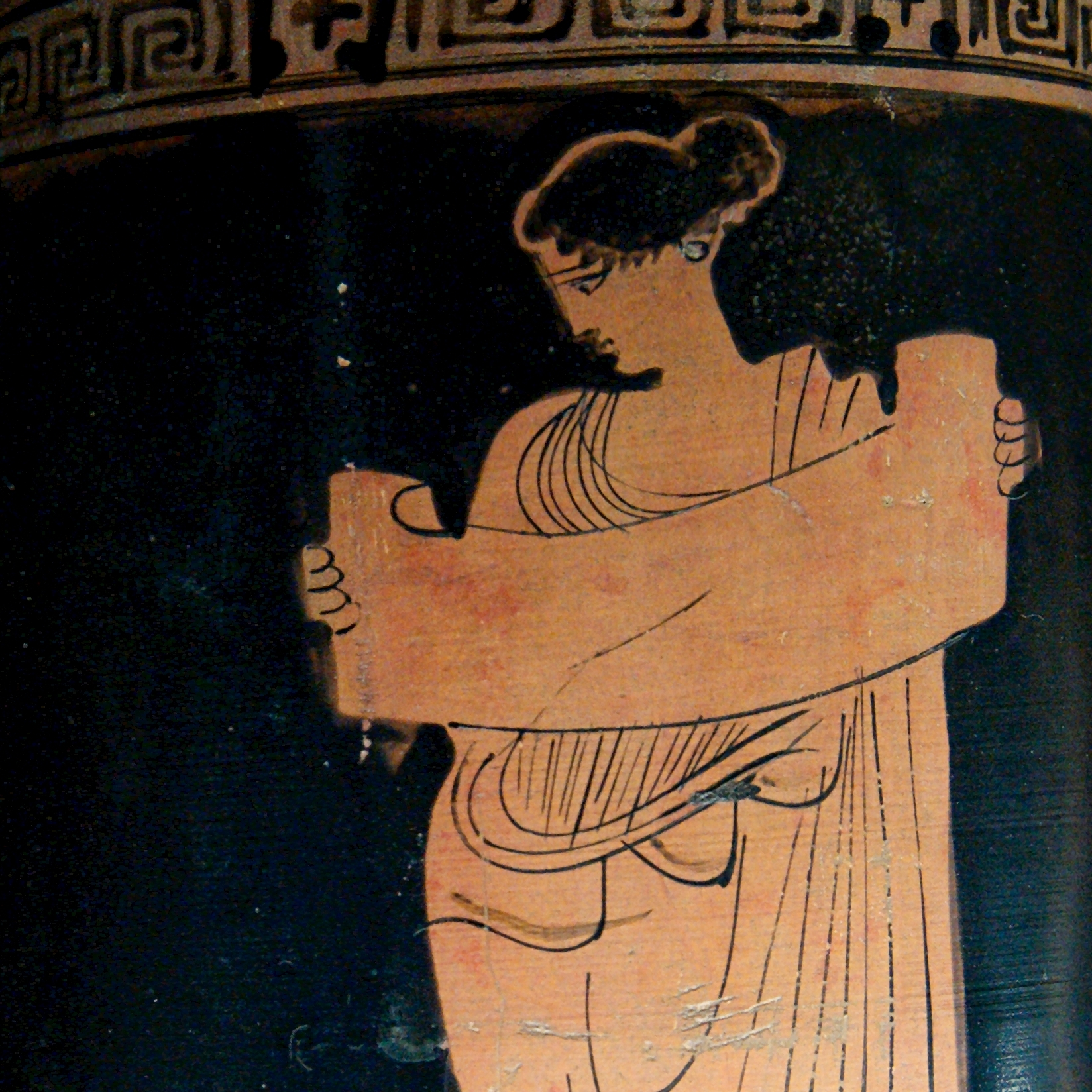
A reading muse

== Overview ==
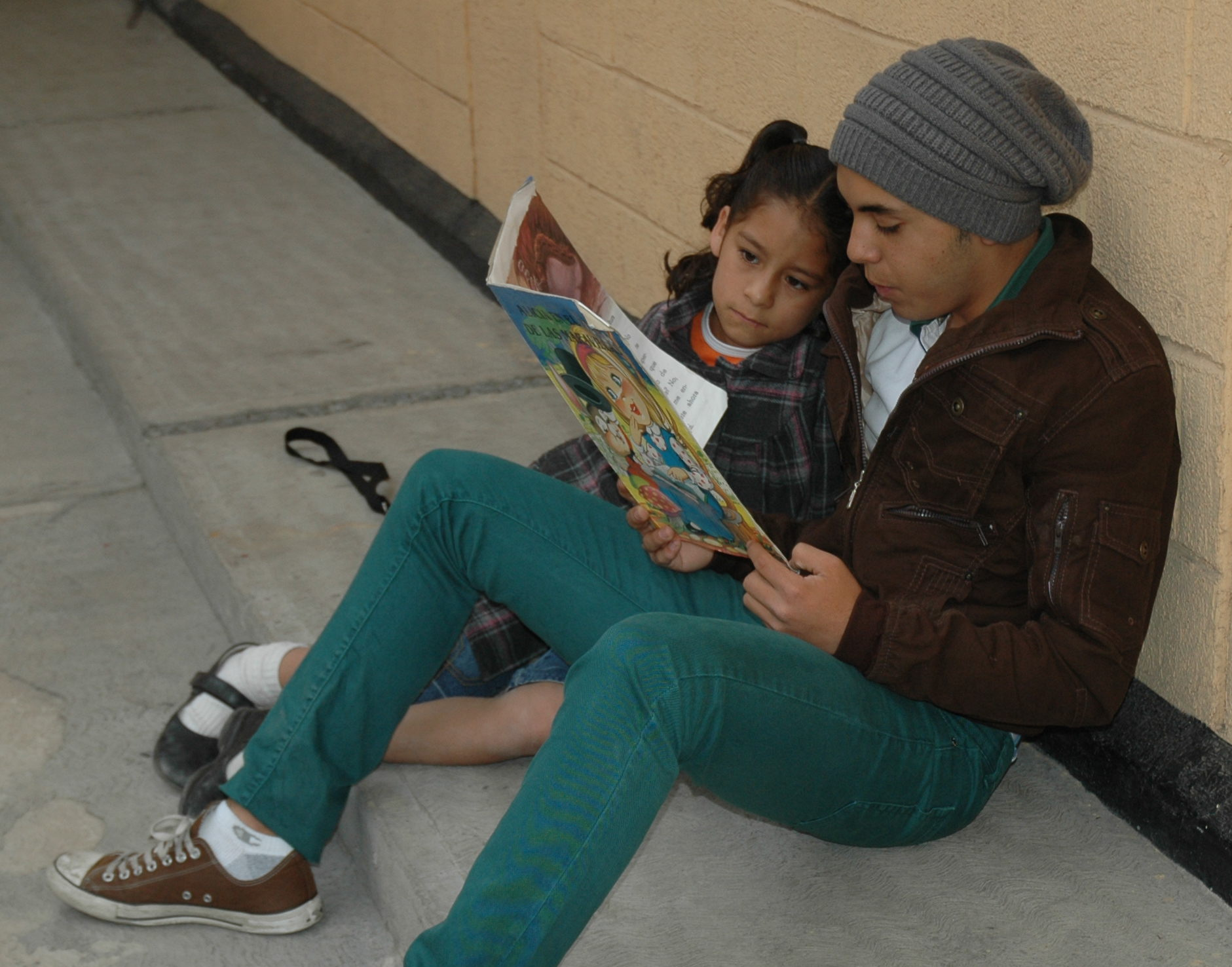
Volunteer reads to a girl at the Casa Hogar de las Niñas in Mexico City.

Reading is generally an individual activity, done silently, although on occasion a person reads out loud for other listeners, or reads aloud for one's own use (e.g., for better comprehension). Before the reintroduction of separated text (spaces between words) in the late Middle Ages, the ability to read silently was considered rather remarkable.

Major predictors of an individual's ability to read both alphabetic and non-alphabetic scripts are oral language skills, phonological awareness, rapid automatized naming and verbal IQ.

As a leisure activity, children and adults read for enjoyment and interest. In the US, it was reported in 2022 that less than half of adults reported reading a book in the past 12 months. Furthermore, only 38 percent reported reading fiction or short stories, a rate that has fallen 17 percent over the past ten years. About 5% read more than 50 books per year. Americans read more if they: have more education, read fluently and easily, are female, live in cities, and have higher socioeconomic status. Children become better readers when they know more about the world in general, and when they perceive reading as fun rather than as a chore to be performed.

=== Writing systems ===
In order to understand a text, it is usually necessary to understand the spoken language associated with that text. In this way, writing systems are distinguished from many other symbolic communication systems. Once established, writing systems on the whole change more slowly than their spoken counterparts, and often preserve features and expressions which are no longer current in the spoken language. The great benefit of writing systems is their ability to maintain a persistent record of information expressed in a language, which can be retrieved independently of the initial act of formulation.

=== Cognitive benefits ===
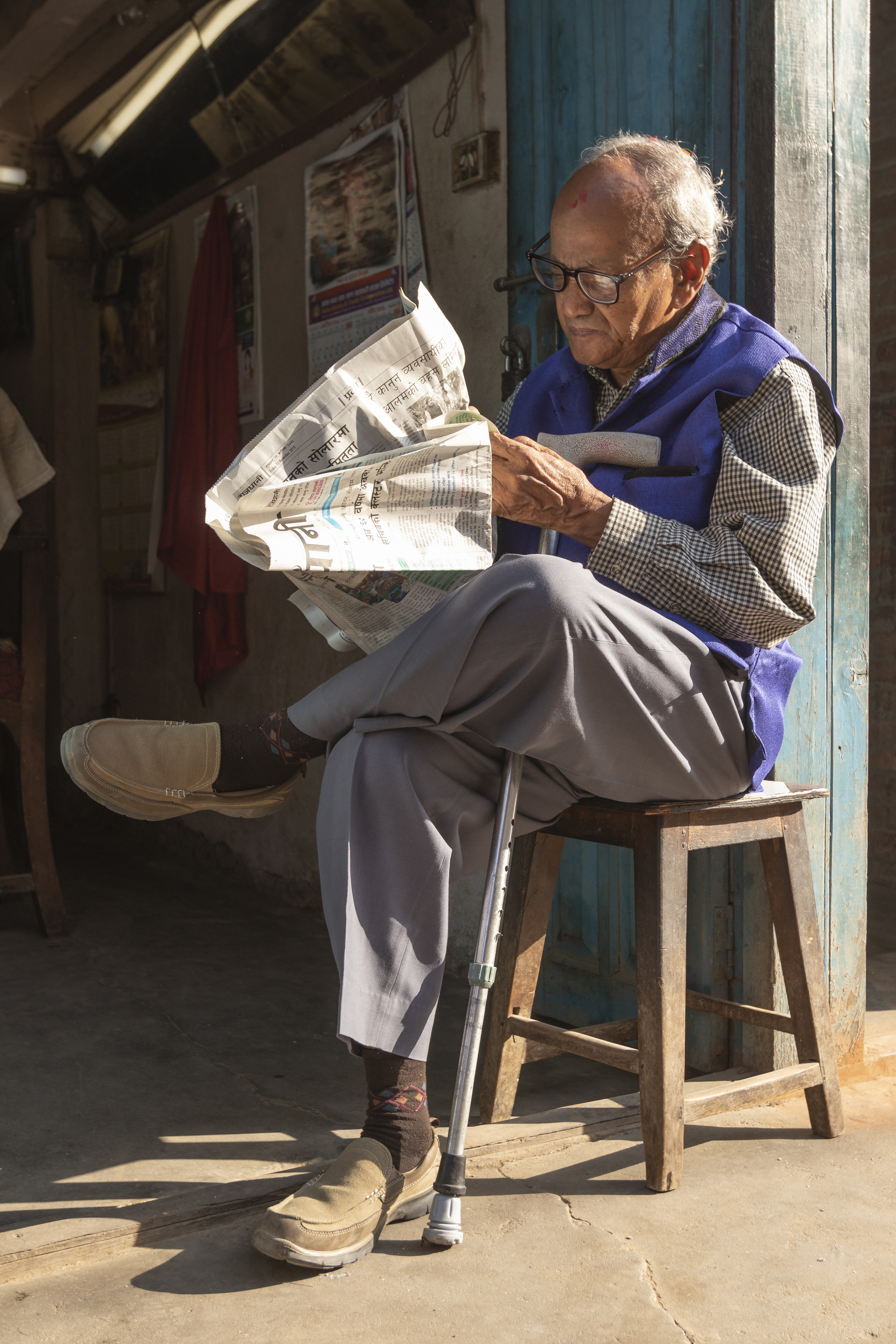
Senior reading a newspaper in Nepal

Reading for pleasure has been linked to increased cognitive progress in vocabulary and mathematics during adolescence. Sustained high volume lifetime reading has been associated with high levels of academic attainment.

The cognitive benefits of reading continue into mid-life and the senior years.

Research suggests that reading books and writing are among the brain-stimulating activities that can slow down cognitive decline in seniors.

=== The right to read ===
On April 23, 1968, when speaking on the occasion of the International Conference on Human Rights organized by the United Nations, the Director-General of UNESCO, Mr. René Maheu, said "One must first be able to read". The following year, James Allen, the then U.S. Commissioner of Education, declared, "There is no higher nationwide priority in the field of education than the provision of the right to read for all." At that time, UNESCO estimated there are 750 million people around the world who cannot read and write. The International Literacy Association reported that, according to UNESCO (2017), 250 million children around the world lack basic literacy skills, saying "it's an issue of social justice". The right to read and write has been addressed by a variety of organizations, such as the South African Human Rights Commission.

A unanimous decision of the Supreme Court of Canada, on November 9, 2012, recognized that learning to read is not a privilege, but a basic and essential human right. This was followed by the Right to Read inquiry report in Ontario, Canada.

== Learning to read ==
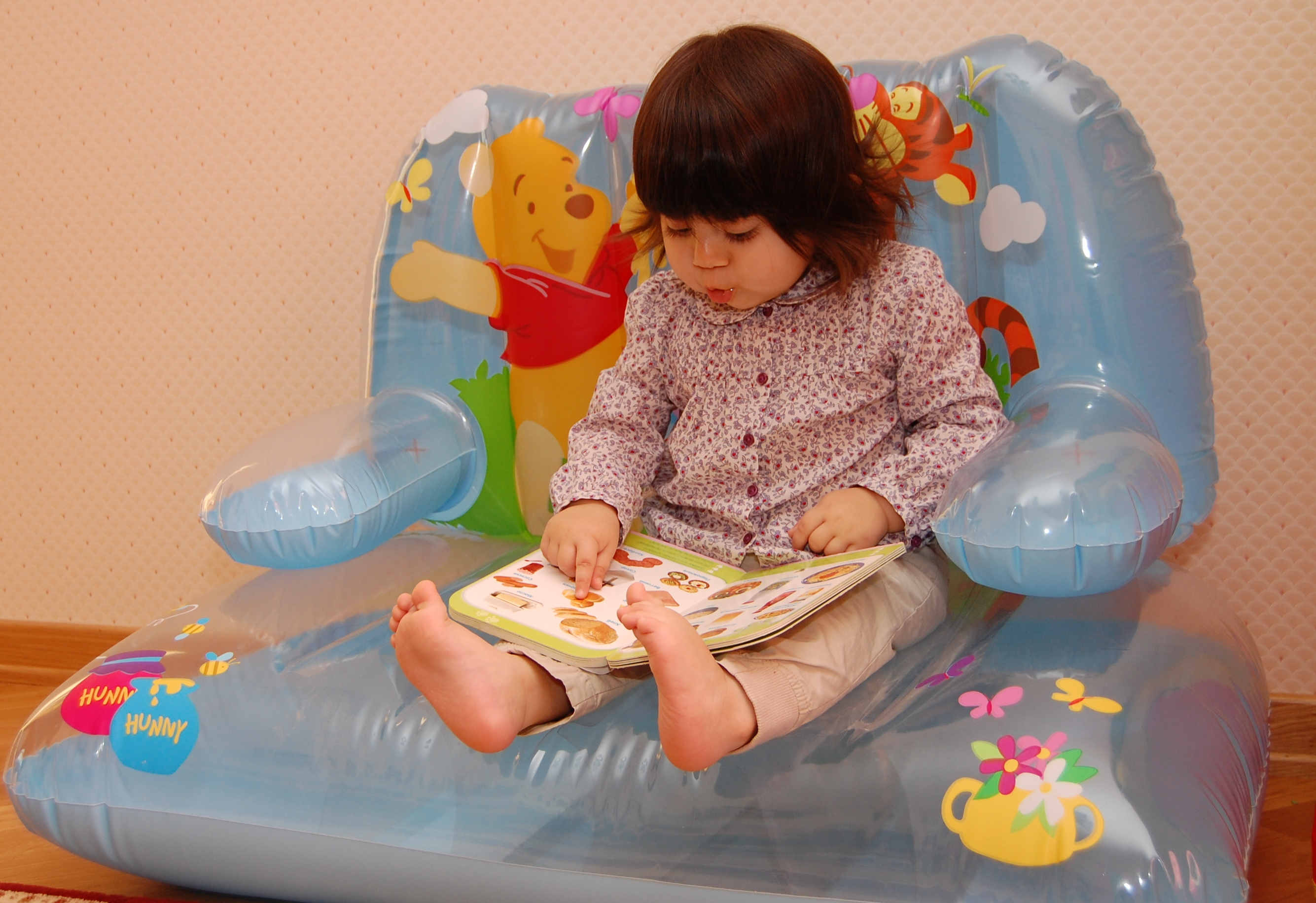
Researchers have concluded that approximately 95% of students can be taught to read by the end of the first or second year of school, yet in many countries 20% or more do not meet that expectation.

Learning to read or reading skills acquisition is the acquisition and practice of the skills necessary to understand the meaning behind printed words. For a skilled reader, the act of reading feels simple, effortless, and automatic. However, the process of learning to read is complex and builds on cognitive, linguistic, and social skills developed from a very early age. As one of the four core language skills (listening, speaking, reading and writing), reading is vital to gaining a command of written language.

== Science of reading ==
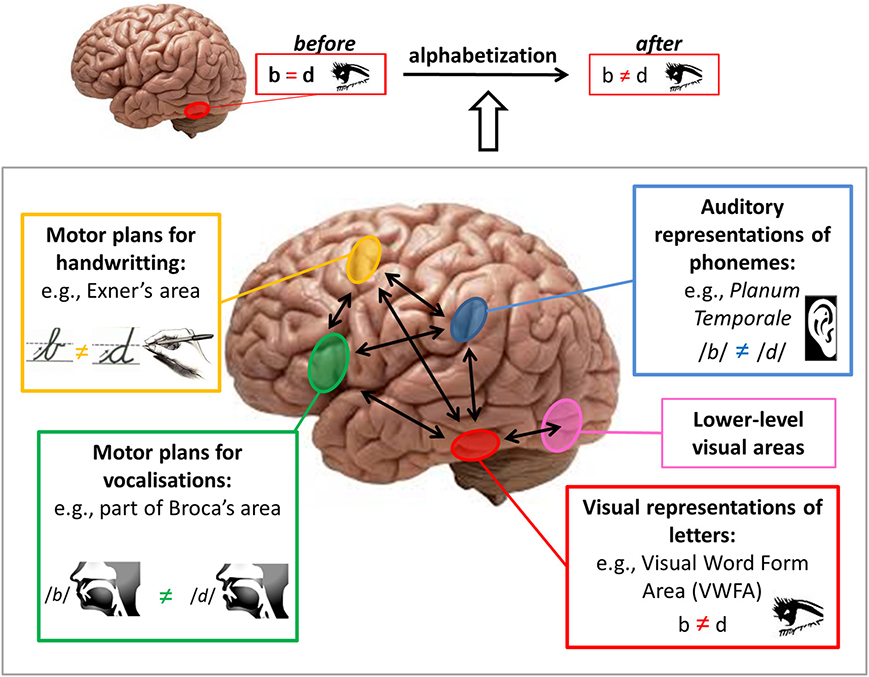
Writing is only about 5,500 years old, unlike human speech which is thought to be from 50,000 years to 2 million years old. So, unlike speech, the brain did not evolve to read naturally. As a result, the brain adapts to the challenge of reading. The process of reading involves most of the brain, especially an interconnection between visual areas and language areas; but also neural systems related to action, emotion, decision-making, and memory.

The science of reading (SoR) is the discipline that studies the objective investigation and accumulation of reliable evidence about how humans learn to read and how reading should be taught. It draws on many fields, including cognitive science, developmental psychology, education, educational psychology, special education, and more.

This article is mainly about the teaching of reading in the United States.

Foundational skills such as phonics, decoding, and phonemic awareness are considered to be important parts of the science of reading, but they are not the only ingredients. SoR also includes areas such as oral reading fluency, vocabulary, morphology, reading comprehension, and more.

In addition, some educators feel that SoR should include digital literacy; background knowledge; content-rich instruction; infrastructure such as curriculum; adaptive teaching; bi-literacy development; and, social justice.

Some researchers suggest there is a need for more studies on the relationship between theory and practice. They say "We know more about the science of reading than about the science of teaching based on the science of reading", and "there are many layers between basic science findings and teacher implementation that must be traversed". Furthermore, the determination of policy or practice should "depend on studies that directly evaluate the effectiveness of a practice or policy" using empirical evidence, rather than basic research alone.

Research in cognitive science and neuroscience has made significant progress in reading. Yet, one researcher asks "if the science is so advanced, why do so many people read so poorly?".

Regarding reading levels, in the United States, the 2019 Nation's Report Card reported that 34% of grade-four public school students performed at or above the NAEP proficient level and 65% performed at or above the basic level. As reported in the PIRLS study, the United States ranked 15th out of 50 countries, for reading comprehension levels of fourth-graders. In addition, according to the 2011–2018 PIAAC study, out of 39 countries the United States ranked 19th for literacy levels of adults 16 to 65; and 16.9% of adults in the United States read at or below level one.

As to why reading levels are low, neuroscientist Mark Seidenberg suggests it may be the result of three factors:

1. the English language has a deep alphabetic orthography
2. linguistic variability contributes to the "Black-White achievement gap"
3. how reading is taught.

With respect to #3, many researchers point to three areas:

- Contemporary reading science has had very little impact on educational practice—mainly because of a "two-cultures problem separating science and education".
- Teaching practices in the 2000s and 2010s rest on outdated assumptions that make learning to read harder than it needs to be.
- Connecting evidence-based practice to educational practice would be beneficial, but is extremely difficult to achieve due to a lack of adequate training of many teachers in the cognitive science relating to reading.

== Teaching reading ==
Teaching reading has significant differences between teaching reading for alphabetic languages and for logographic languages.

== Requirements for proficient reading ==
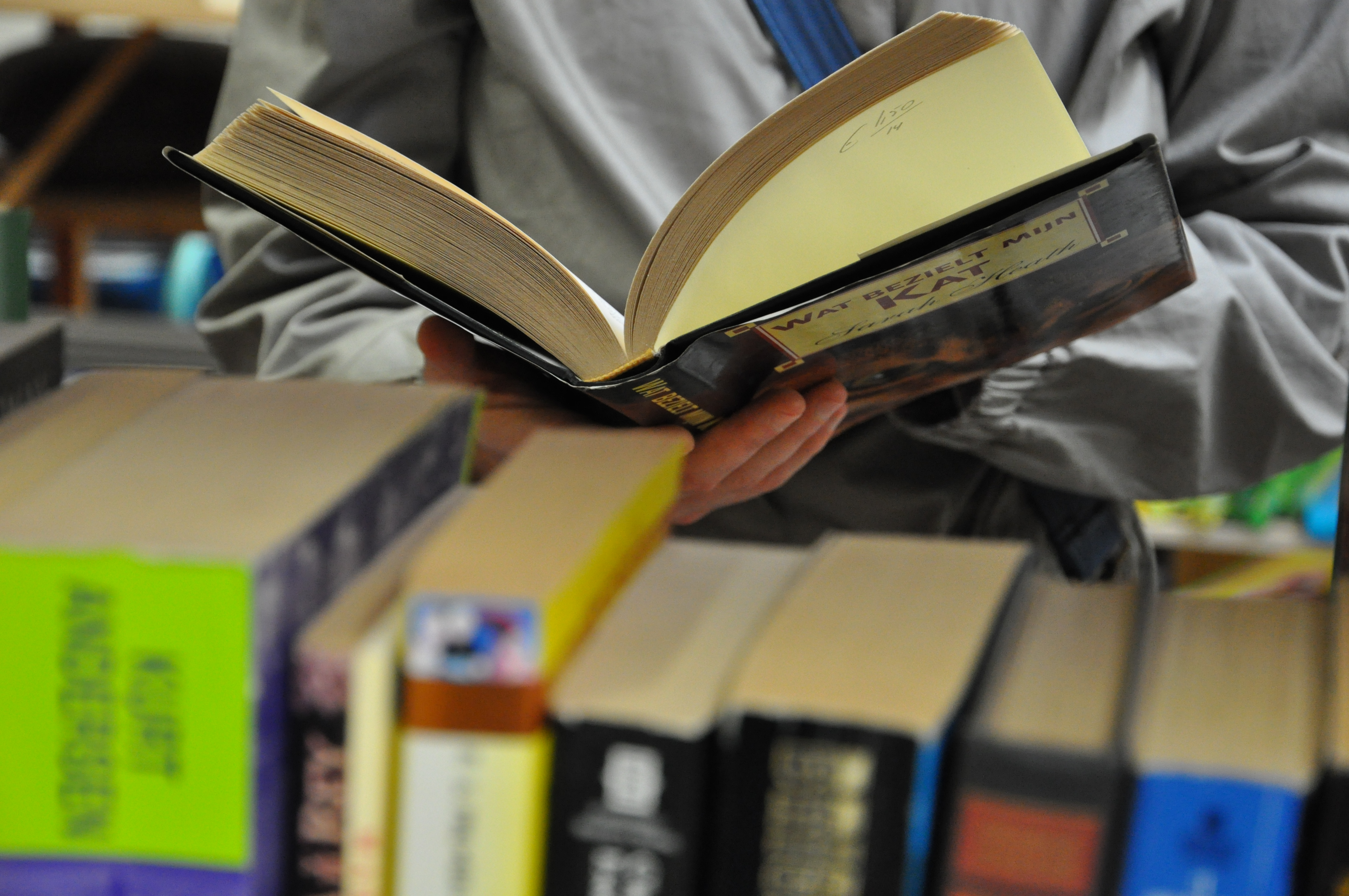
A person reading a book, in a second-hand store.

According to the report by the US National Reading Panel (NRP) in 2000, the elements required for proficient reading of alphabetic languages are phonemic awareness, phonics, fluency, vocabulary, and text comprehension. In non-Latin languages, proficient reading does not necessarily require phonemic awareness, but rather an awareness of the individual parts of speech, which may also include the whole word (as in Chinese characters) or syllables (as in Japanese) as well as others depending on the writing system being employed.

The Rose Report, from the Department for Education in England makes it clear that, in their view, systematic phonics, specifically synthetic phonics, is the best way to ensure that children learn to read; such that it is now the law. In 2005 the government of Australia published a report stating "The evidence is clear ... that direct systematic instruction in phonics during the early years of schooling is an essential foundation for teaching children to read". Phonics has been gaining acceptance in many other countries as can be seen from this page Practices by country or region.

Other important elements are: rapid automatized naming (RAN), a general understanding of the orthography of the language, and practice.

- Rapid automatized naming, the ability to say quickly the names of letters, objects and colors, predicts an individual's ability to read. This might be linked to the importance of quick retrieval of phonological representations from long-term memory in reading and the importance of object-naming circuits in the left cerebral hemisphere that are recruited to underpin a learner's word-recognition abilities.
- Orthography describes or defines the set of symbols used in a language, and the rules about how to write these symbols (i.e., the conventional spelling system of a language). Orthographic Development proceeds in increasing complexity as a person learns to read. Some of the first things to be learnt are the orthographic conventions such as the direction of reading and that there are differing typefaces and capitalization for each symbol. In general, this means that to read proficiently, the reader has to understand the elements of a written language. In the United States, a limited amount of spelling is taught up to grade four, and beyond that "we gain orthographic expertise by reading"; so the amount and variety of texts that children read is important.
- Practice: Repeated exposure to print improves many aspects of learning to read and most importantly the knowledge of individual words. It increases the speed at which high-frequency words are recognized which allows for increased fluency in reading. It also supports orthographic development, reading comprehension and vocabulary development. Research suggests there is value in reading words both in isolation and in context. Reading words in isolation promotes faster reading times and better memory for spellings; whereas, reading words in context improves semantic knowledge and comprehension.

== Reading disability ==
A reading disability is a condition in which a person displays difficulty reading. Examples of reading disabilities include developmental dyslexia and alexia (acquired dyslexia).

== History ==
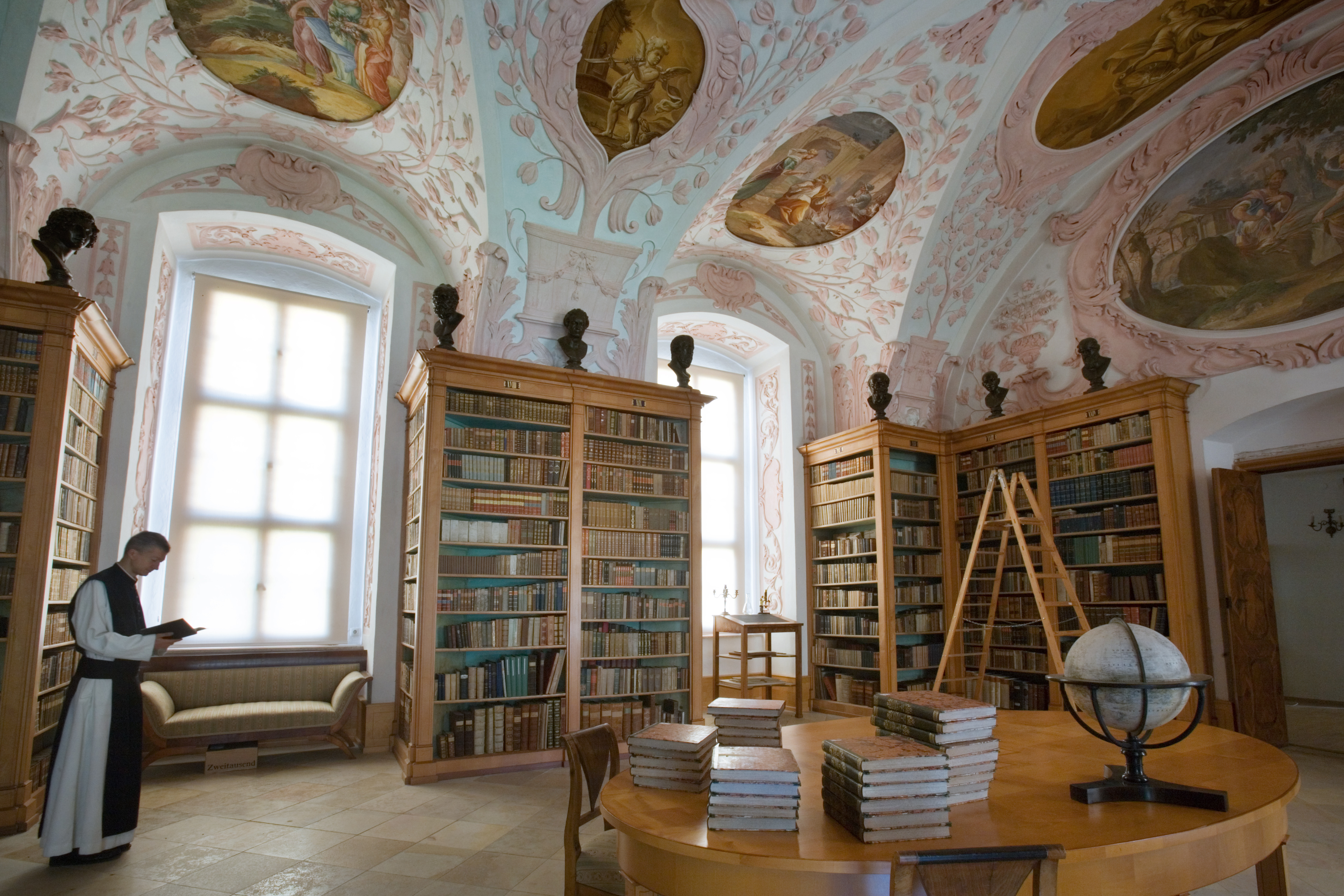
A Catholic monk reading in a monastery library

The history of reading dates back to the invention of writing during the 4th millennium BC. Although reading print text is now an important way for the general population to access information, this has not always been the case. With some exceptions, only a small percentage of the population in many countries was considered literate before the Industrial Revolution. Some of the pre-modern societies with generally high literacy rates included classical Athens and the Islamic caliphate.

Scholars assume that reading aloud (Latin clare legere) was the more common practice in antiquity, and that reading silently (legere tacite or legere sibi) was unusual. In his Confessions (c. 400), Saint Augustine remarks on Saint Ambrose's unusual habit of reading in silence.

Michel de Certeau argued that while the Age of Enlightenment initially promoted the virtue of reading, writing was still considered a superior activity, due to a belief among social elites that writing was constructive and a sign of social initiative, while reading was straightforward consumption of what had already made; as such, readers were passive citizens.

Before the mid-18th century, children's books in England usually focused on instruction or religious themes. Over time, a greater number of books were written with the intent of delighting children; for example, children's novels became increasingly popular over the 18th century. By 1800, the area of children's literature was flourishing, with perhaps as many as 50 books being printed every year in major cities.

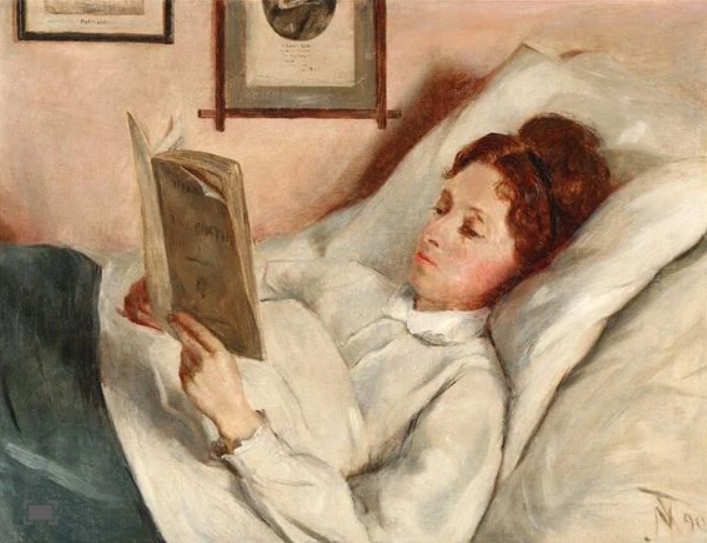
Nicoline Tuxen - Portrait of a woman reading in bed

In 18th-century Europe, some considered the then-new practice of reading alone in bed to be dangerous and immoral, for a time. As reading became a less communal, largely silent activity, some raised concerns that reading in bed presented various dangers, such as fires caused by bedside candles of people reading before sleep. Some modern critics speculate that these concerns were rooted partially in fear that readers – especially women readers – would shirk their obligations to their family and community, and even transgress moral boundaries via the private fantasy afforded by books. Also during the 18th century in England, reading novels was often criticized as a time-wasting pastime, when contrasted with the cultural seriousness carried by reading history, classical literature or poetry.

Chapbooks were small, cheap forms of literature for children and adults that were sold on the streets, and covered a range of subjects such as ghost stories, crime, fantasy, politics, and disaster updates. They provided simple reading matter and were commonplace across England from the 17th to the 19th century. They are known to have been passed down through the generations. Their readership would have been largely among the poor, and among children of the middle class.

Reading became even more pronounced in the 19th century with public notes, broadsides, catchpennies, and printed songs becoming common street literature, it informed and entertained the public before newspapers became readily available. Advertisements and local news, such as offers of rewards for catching criminals or for the return of stolen goods, appeared on public notices and handbills, while cheaply printed sheets – broadsheets and ballads – covered political or criminal news such as murders, trials, executions, disasters, and rescues.

Technological improvements during the Industrial Revolution in printing and paper production; and new distribution networks enabled by improved roads and rail helped push an increased demand for printed (reading) matter. Besides this, social and educational changes (such as wider schooling rates) along with increasing literacy rates, particularly among the middle and working classes, helped boost a new mass market for printed material. The arrival of gas and electric lighting in private homes meant that reading after dark no longer had to take place by oil lamp or candlelight.

In 19th-century Russia, reading practices were highly varied, as people from a wide range of social statuses read Russian and foreign-language texts ranging from high literature to the peasant lubok. Provincial readers such as Andrei Chikhachev give evidence of the omnivorous appetite for fiction and non-fiction alike among middling landowners.

In the 20th and 21st centuries, the use of audiobooks for reading has become increasingly popular. Although some contest the validity of audiobook usage as actual reading since it does not generally involve direct contact with written word but rather uses a mediating narrator, audiobooks are seen by many as a continuation of oral tradition as well as an accessibility measure for the visually impaired. The popularity of audiobooks in the 21st century in the US is possibly due to technological advances that make such materials widely available for download, often through public libraries.

== Other terms ==
Subvocalization

The sense that a reader is combining silent reading with internal sounding of the words. Advocates of speed reading claim it can be a bad habit that slows reading and comprehension, but some researchers say this is a fallacy since there is no actual speaking involved. Instead, it may help skilled readers to read since they are using the phonological code to understand words (e.g., the difference between PERmit and perMIT).

Speed reading

Techniques claimed to increase reading speed without experiencing an unacceptable reduction in comprehension or retention. Purported techniques include chunking of words in a body of text, skimming, and others. However, cognitive neuroscientists such as Stanislas Dehaene and Mark Seidenberg say that claims of reading up to 1,000 words per minute are impossible and 'must be viewed with skepticism'. For most adults, the English reading speed falls between 175 and 320 words per minute.

Proofreading

A kind of reading for the purpose of detecting typographical errors. It is not reading in the usual sense, as the proofreader may largely suspend comprehension while doing so.

Rereading

Reading a book more than once. "One cannot read a book: one can only reread it," Vladimir Nabokov once said.

Analytical reading

Popularized by Mortimer Adler in How to Read a Book, analytical reading is mainly for non-fiction works, in which one analyzes a writing according to three dimensions: 1) the structure and purpose of the work, 2) the logical propositions made, and 3) evaluation of the merits of the arguments and conclusions. This method involves suspending judgment of the work or its arguments until they are fully understood.

The Survey-question-read-recite-review (SQ3R) method

Often taught in public schools, this involves reading so as to be able to teach what is read, and is appropriate for instructors preparing to teach material without referring to notes.

Rapid serial visual presentation (RSVP) reading

Involves presenting the words in a sentence one word at a time at the same location on the display screen, at a specified eccentricity; for studying the timing of vision.

In-depth reading or exploratory reading

A method that is used to gain deeper meaning and comprehension of a text, research detailed information for this assignment, and read very difficult sections of a text. Five strategies include the RAP strategy, the RIDA strategy, the Five S method, and SQ3R. Exploratory reading allows multiple people a narrower purpose, to understand the concepts or arguments of a text.

== Gallery ==
=== Paintings ===
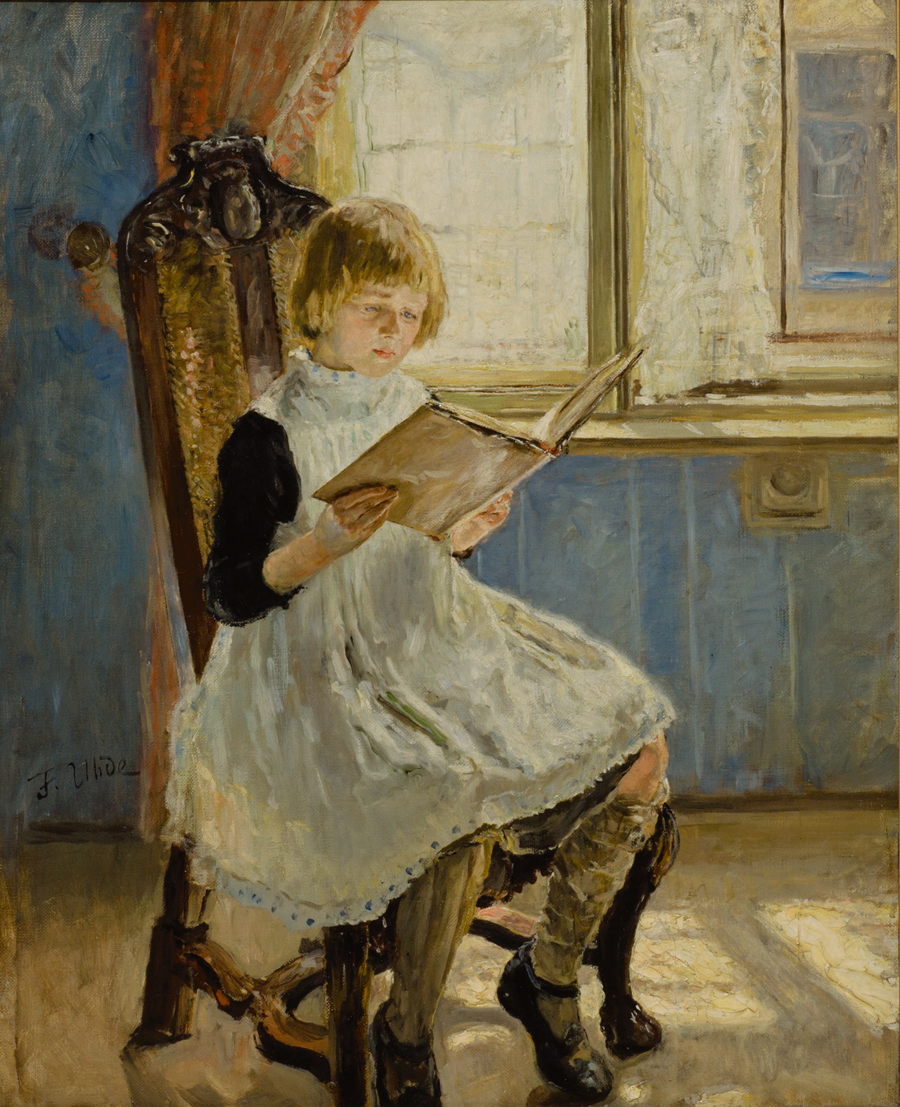
Girl Reading (1889), by Fritz von Uhde. Oil paint on canvas.

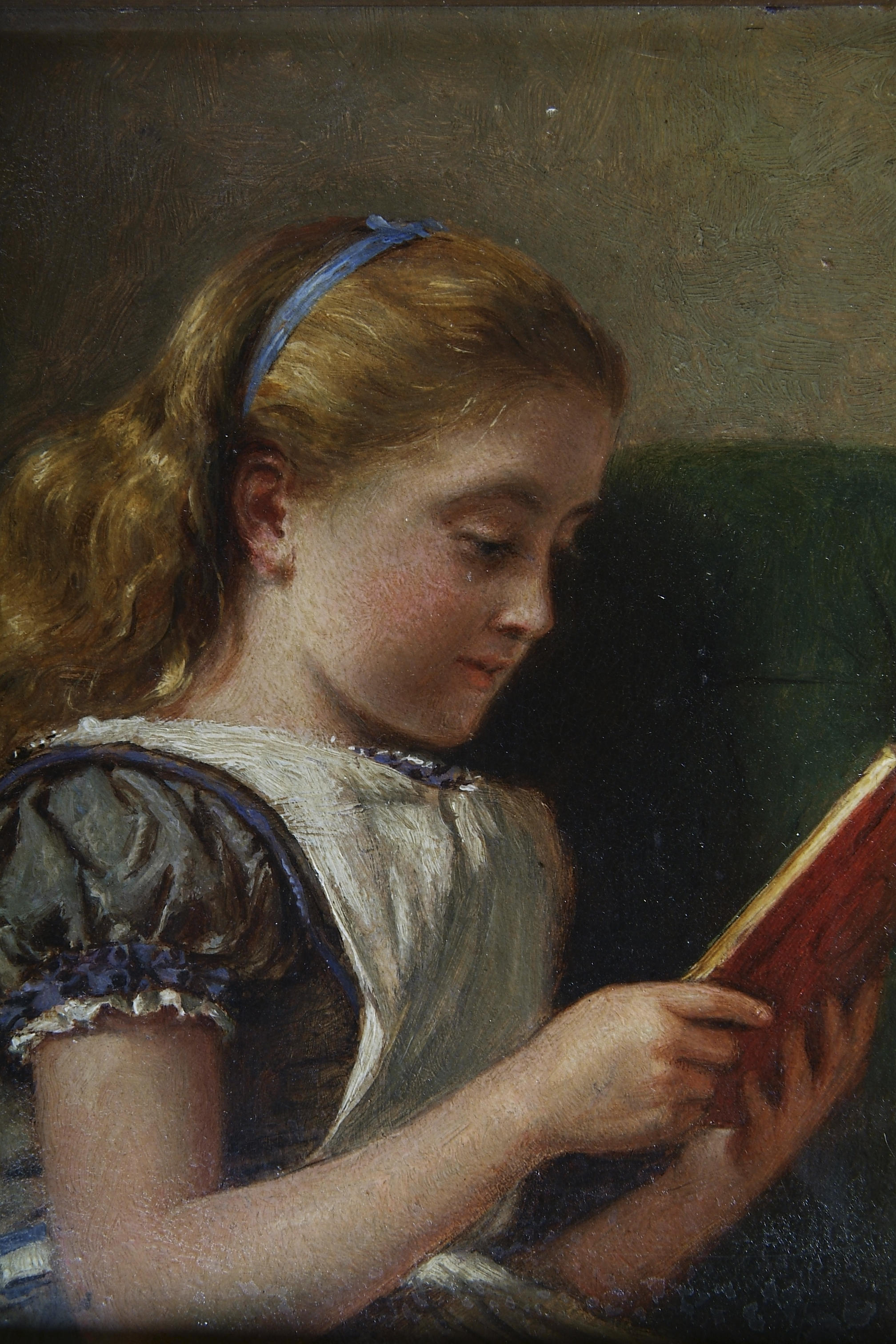
Young Girl Reading (1924) by George Goodwin Kilburne

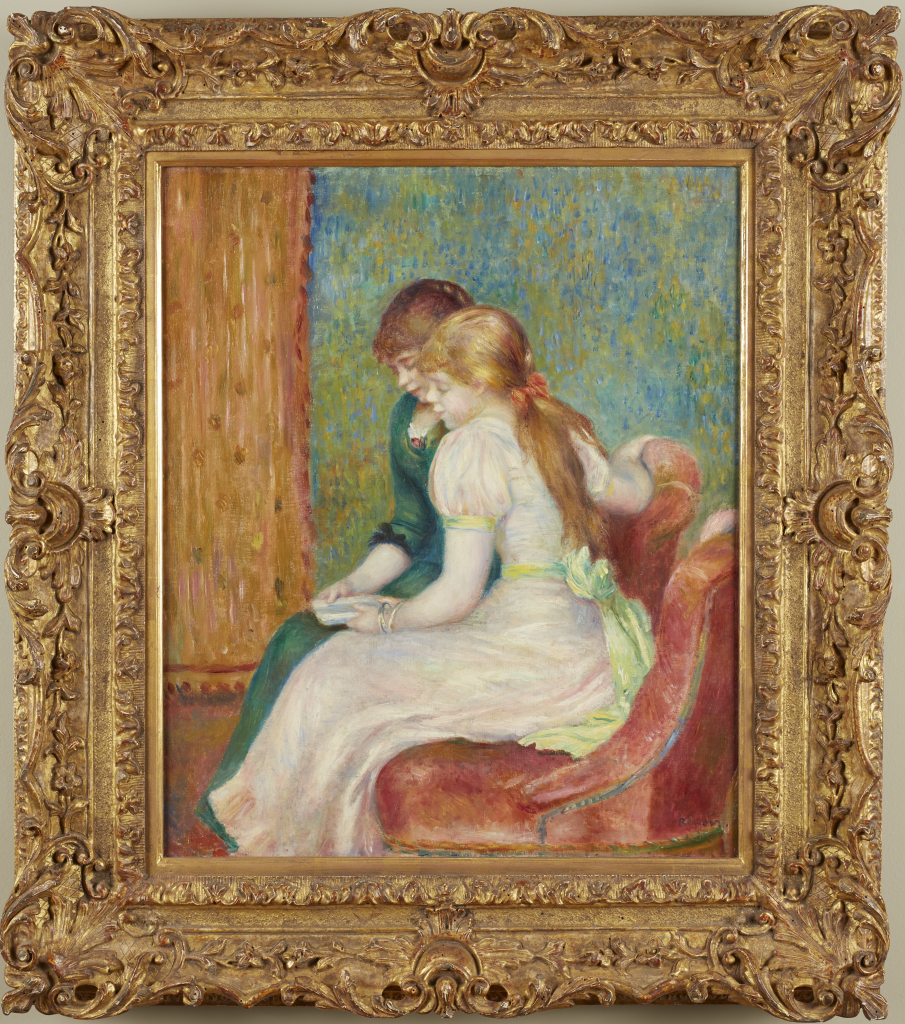
Young Girls Reading (1891) by Auguste Renoir

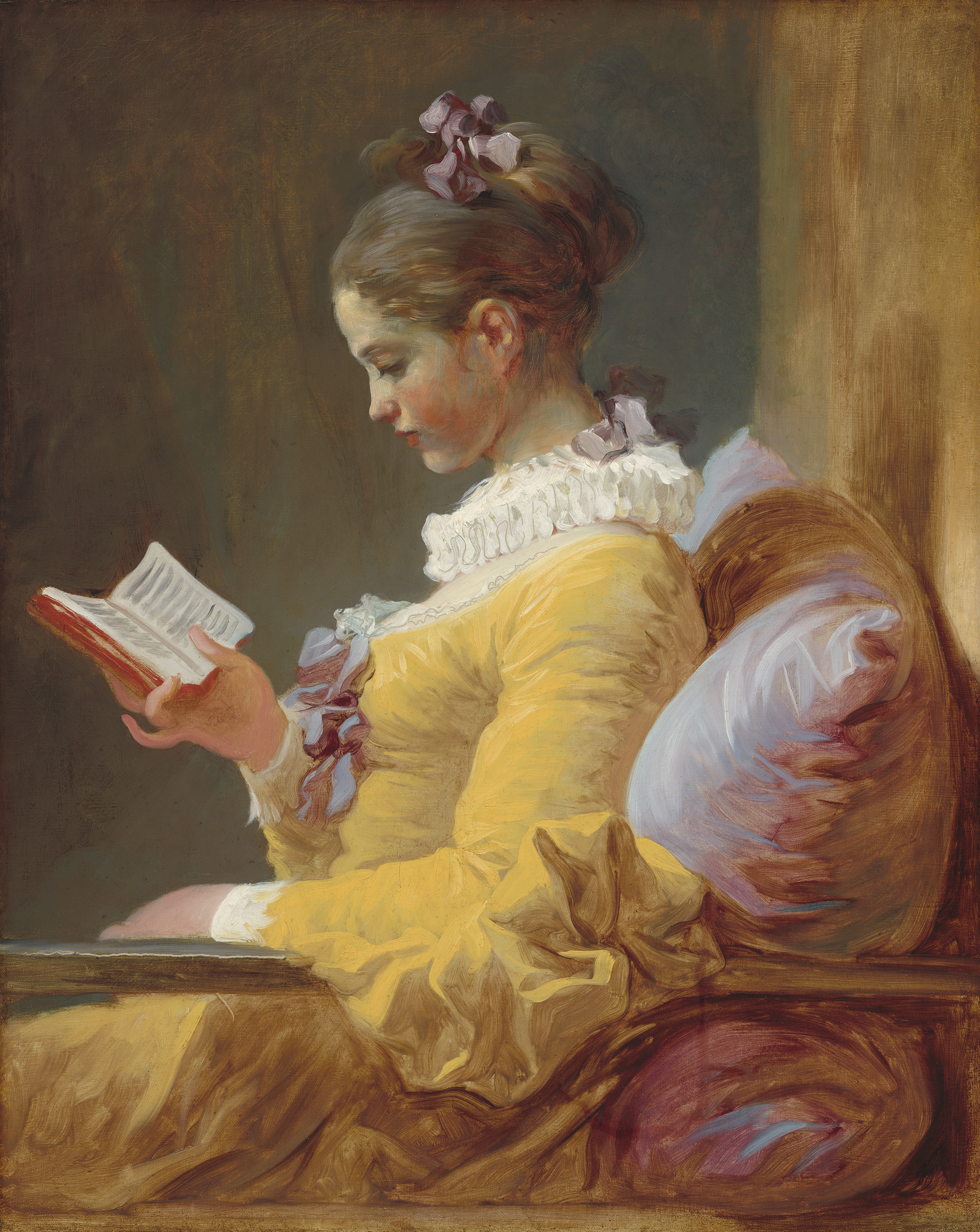
A Young Girl Reading (c. 1770), oil painting by Jean-Honoré Fragonard

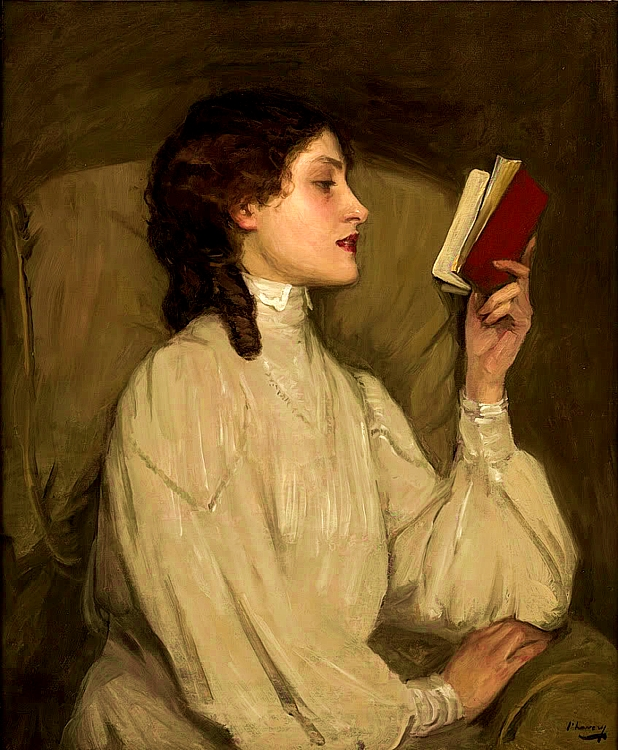
Miss Auras, by John Lavery, depicts a woman reading a book.

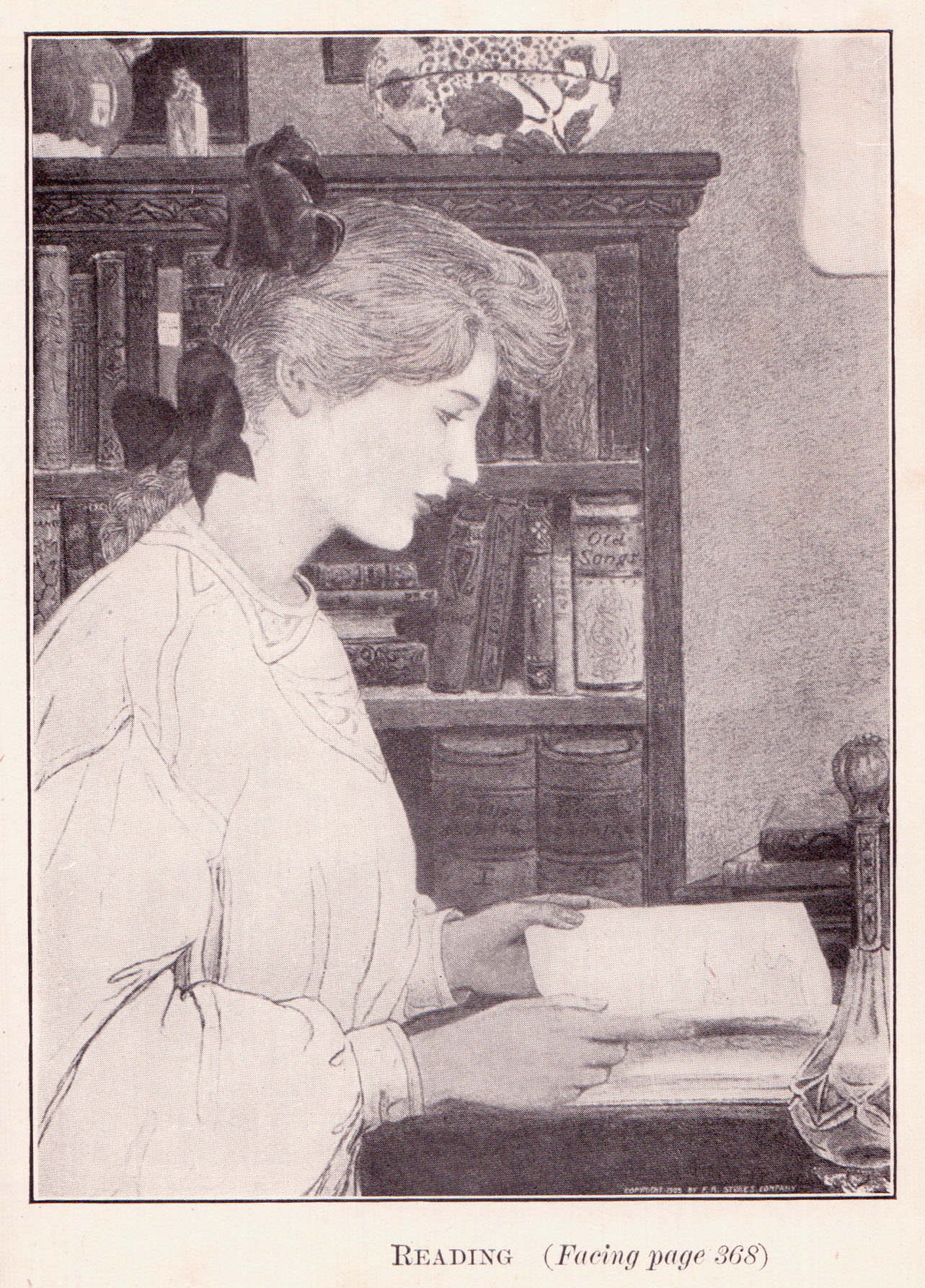
A girl reading from the public domain image book, "What Shall We Do?" "Five Hundred Games and Pastimes" by Dorothy Canfield published in 1907 by Frederick A Stokes Company of New York

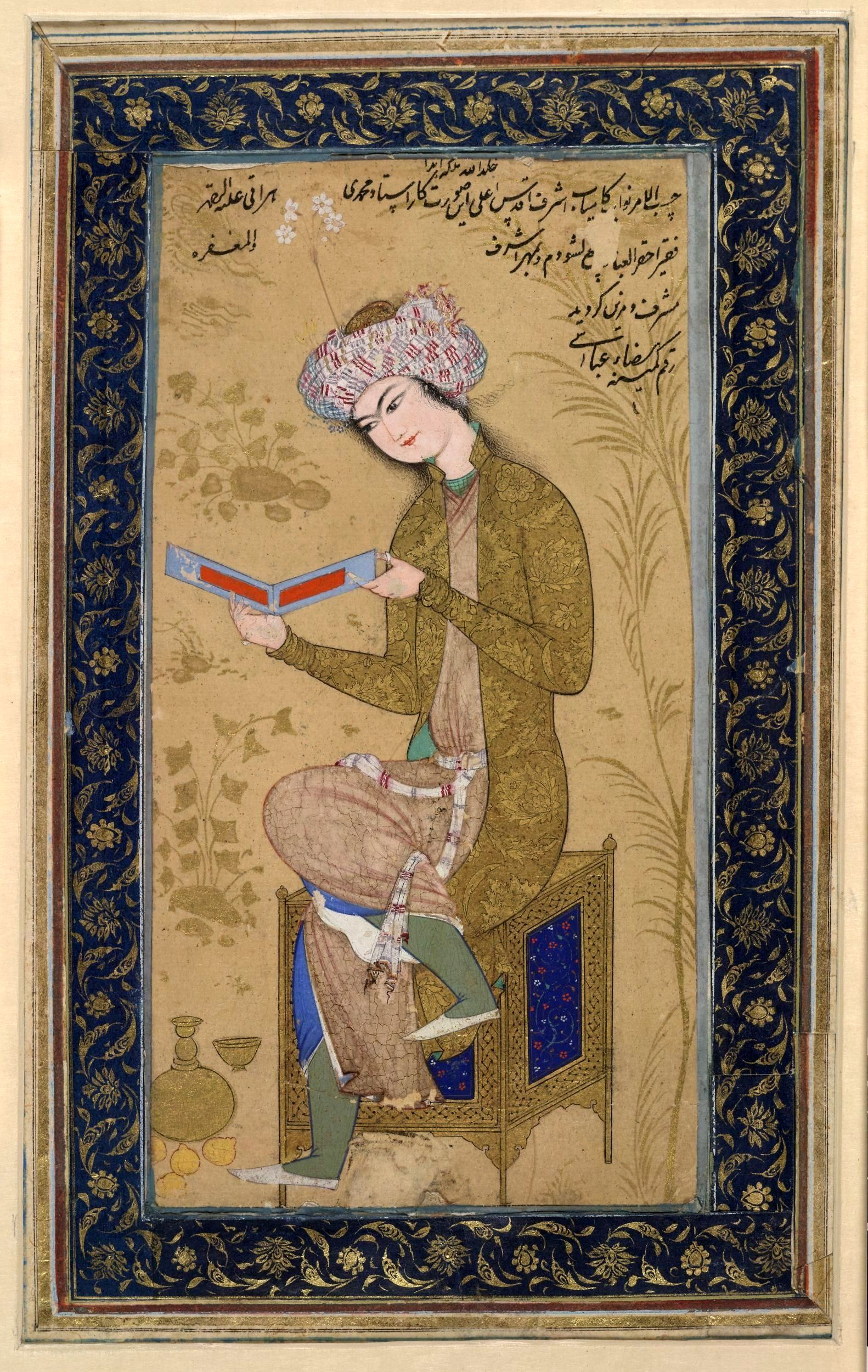
Youth reading, Persian miniature by Reza Abbasi (1625–26)

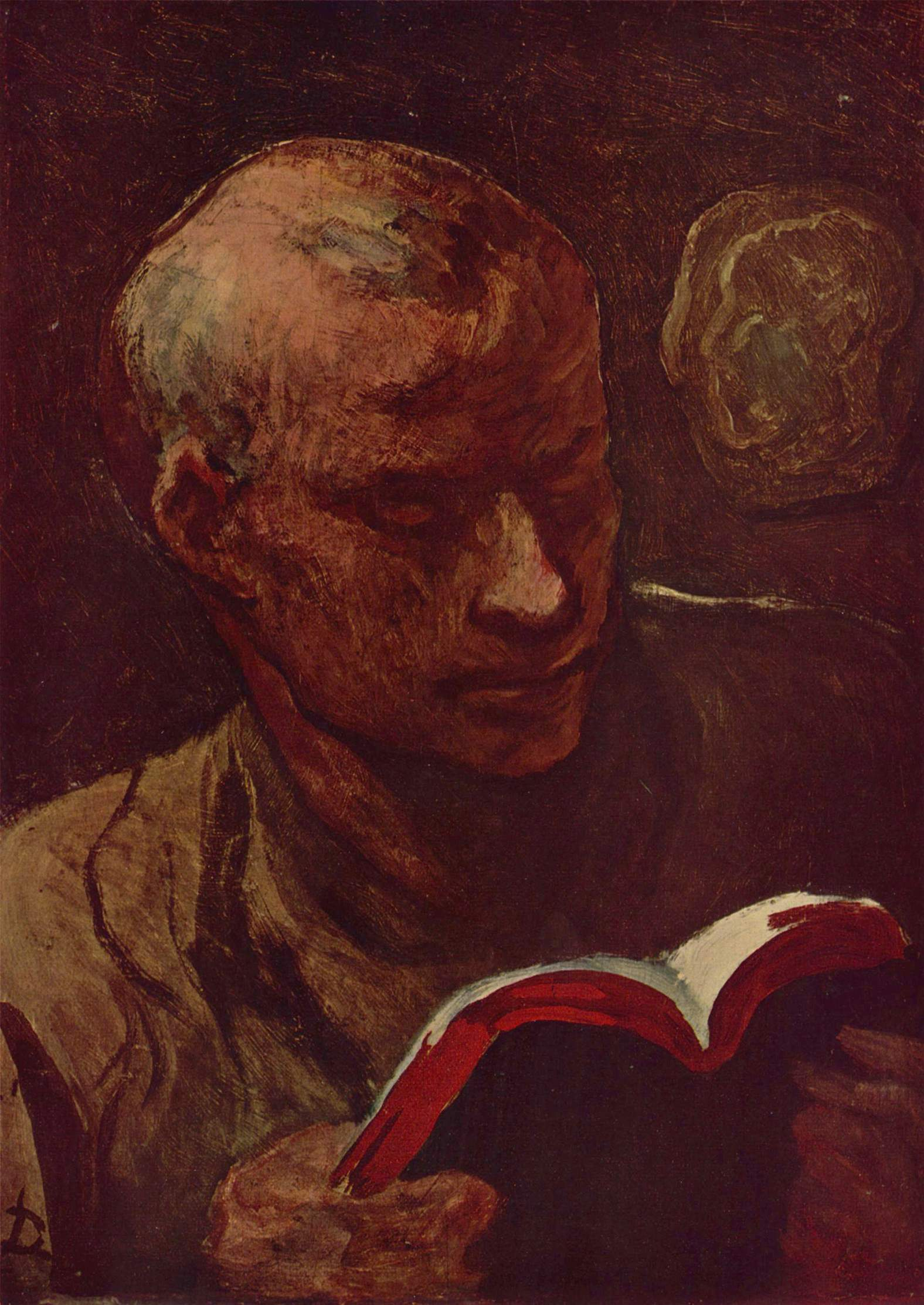
Reader, a painting by Honoré Daumier

=== Photographs ===
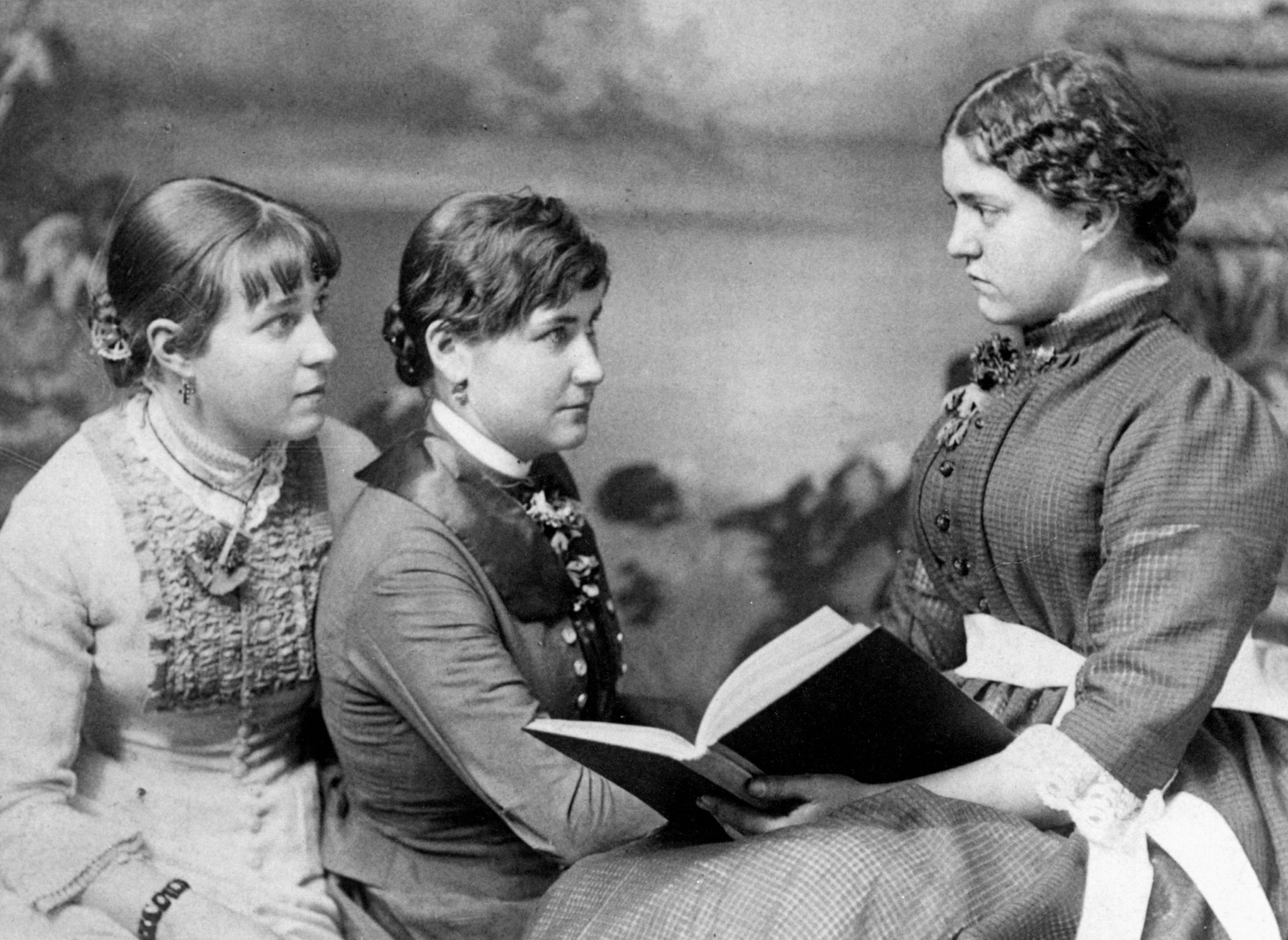
Three girls reading (1880)

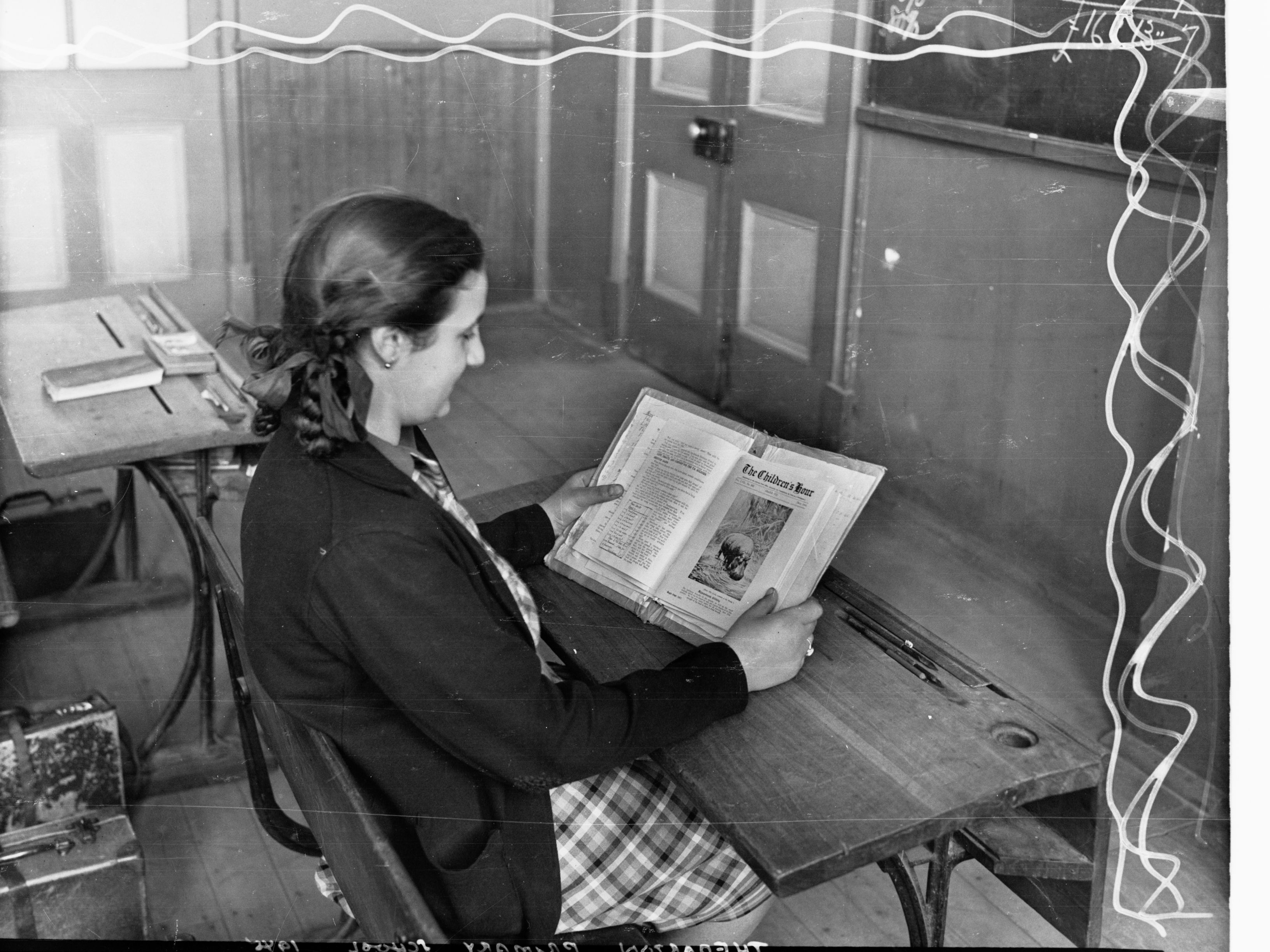
Girl reading a book featuring the title "The Children's Hour" and a photograph of a Hippopotamus in Thebarton Primary School, South Australia (1945)

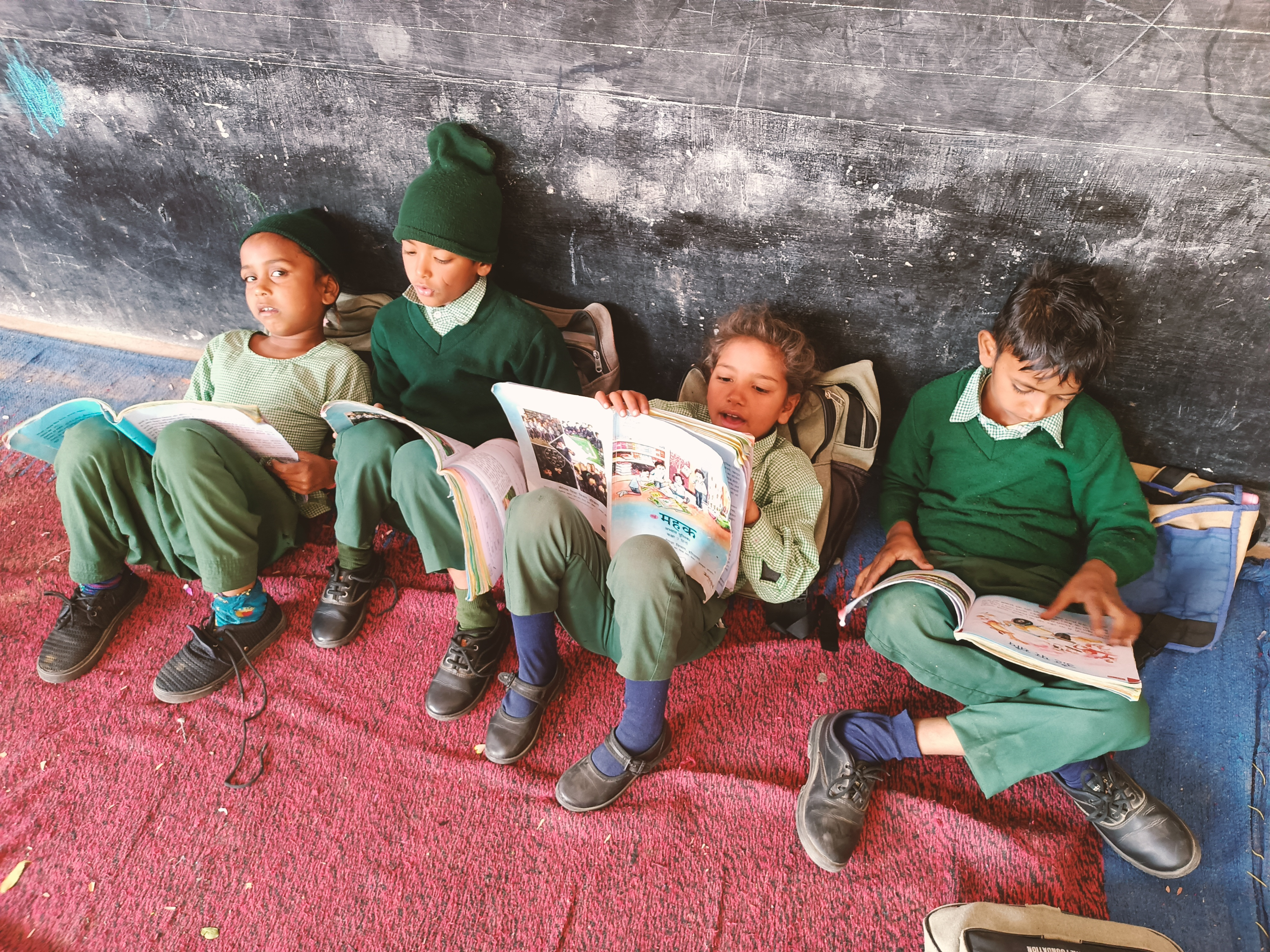
Students reading in leisure time at Government Primary school Asir, Sirsa, Haryana province of India

== See also ==
- Baseball Study
- Educational software
- Evidence-based education
- Mississippi Miracle
- Phonics
- Primary education
- Reading comprehension
- Reading disability
- Reading for special needs
- Simple view of reading
- Structured literacy
- Synthetic phonics
- Systematic phonics
- Women reading in art
- Writing
