= Irlen syndrome =

Proposed vision disorder

Irlen syndrome (or scotopic sensitivity syndrome) is a purported medical condition defined by disordered visual processing. It is proposed that it can be treated by wearing colored lenses. The ideas of Irlen syndrome are not supported by scientific evidence, and psychologists and medical professionals have described its treatment as a health fraud.

== Scientific assessment ==
Some psychologists and medical professionals say that the ideas of Irlen syndrome are pseudoscientific and not supported by scientific evidence. Others say that the treatment of Irlen syndrome is a form of health fraud that takes advantage of vulnerable people.

Medical organisations that don't recognise Irlen Syndrome include the World Health Organization, American Academy of Ophthalmology, and the American Academy of Pediatrics.

The Royal Australian and New Zealand College of Ophthalmologists (RANZCO) released a statement in 2018, stating that there is no scientific evidence that Irlen Syndrome exists, or that the supposed treatments help people who struggle with reading difficulties.

== History ==
The condition was proposed in the 1980s, by Helen Irlen, an educational psychologist. Irlen said that certain children and adults who had reading difficulties improved upon overlaying coloured acetate sheets on top of the text that was being read. Irlen defines the syndrome as a light-based visual processing problem. She theorizes that the brain is unable to process light and visual stimuli efficiently, leading to visual stress and poor reading comprehension. The symptoms of Irlen Syndrome can include behavioural difficulties, reading difficulties, headaches, fatigue, and light sensitivity.

The diagnostic test for Irlen Syndrome was developed by Irlen, and consists of a questionnaire of 32 questions, a series of visual tasks, and an assessment where coloured lenses are presented to the patient to see if there is any reading improvement when using them. Irlen has not provided any data related to the diagnostic test or released a comprehensive diagnostic criteria.

In 1985 Irlen submitted a patent for coloured lenses, to be used in glasses frames, for dyslexics and people with Irlen syndrome.

The Irlen method uses tinted lenses. The method is intended to reduce visual distortions, eye strain, and fatigue.

== See also ==
- Dyslexia – Learning disability affecting reading
