= Women reading in art =

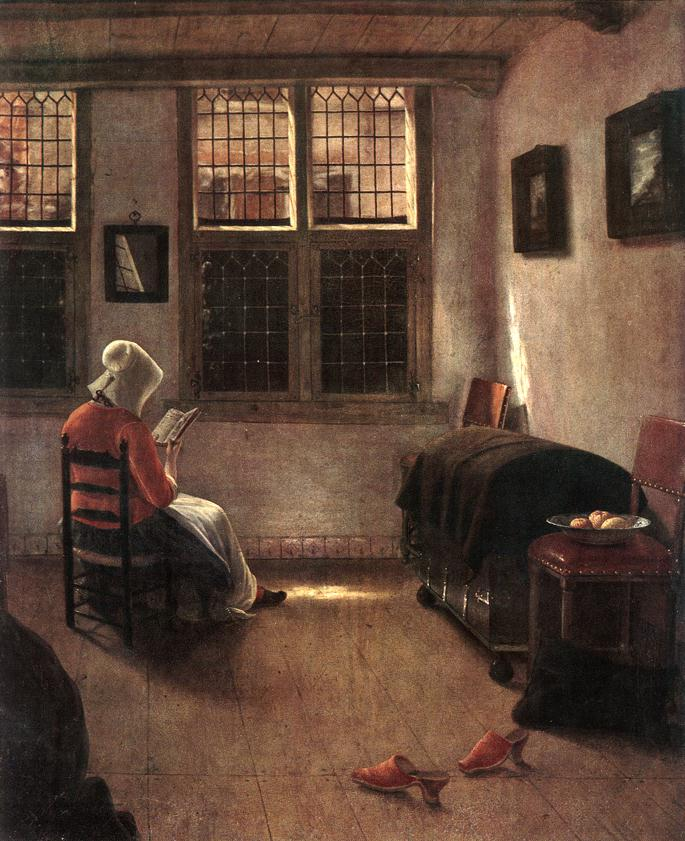
Elinga, Reading Woman, c. 1660

Women reading in art refers to any artistic work representing one or more women in the act of reading. This subject matter is quite common, with images appearing as early as the 14th century. Viewers are often exposed to a private, personal moment through these works. Reading Woman (c.1660) by Pieter Janssans Elinga portrays reading as an intimate and introspective activity.

Beyond the exchange of ideas between author and reader, scholar James Conlon, describes reading as an intimate and erotic subject, through the captivating book that touches and holds the reader's attention, and offers tactile pleasure in weight. As a result, the image of a woman reading becomes one of sexual subversion, and a source of fear for the male viewer or artist. In Western, patriarchal societies, Conlon argues, the act of reading takes a woman out of subservient role and into a context where personal pleasure, knowledge, and enjoyment is literally in her hands.

== Depictions of women readers ==
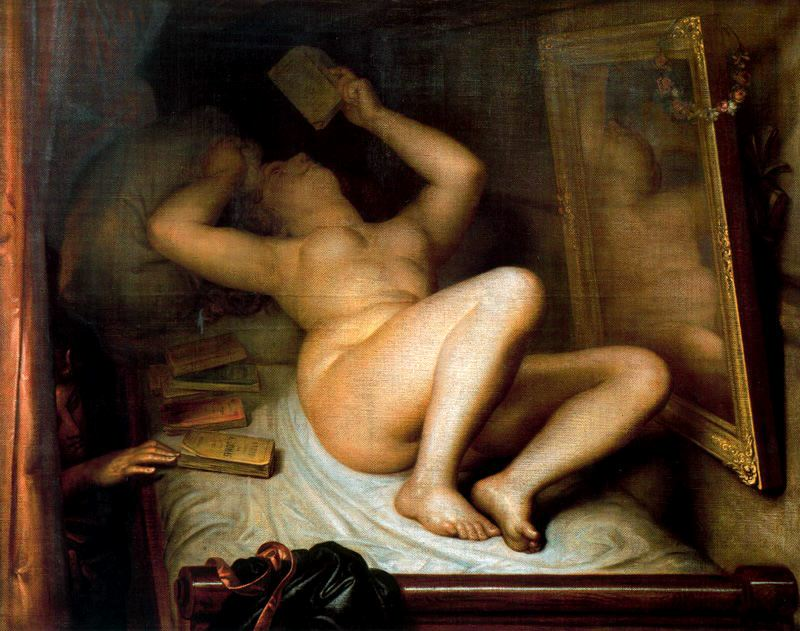
Antoine Wiertz, The Reader of Novels, c. 1853

During the 19th century, amidst a golden age for reading, concerns emerged about women's reading as jeopardizing marital and familial structures. Drawings and illustrations of the time reflected this fear that women would be seduced by books and neglect their domestic duties. Other images implied the danger in tempting women with books as explicitly linked to their sexuality, like in Antoine Wiertz's The Reader of Novels (c.1853), where the figure of the devil literally supplies the female subject with pleasurable reading material. It was also used to showcase how the general population of women were interested in reading during the 19th century.

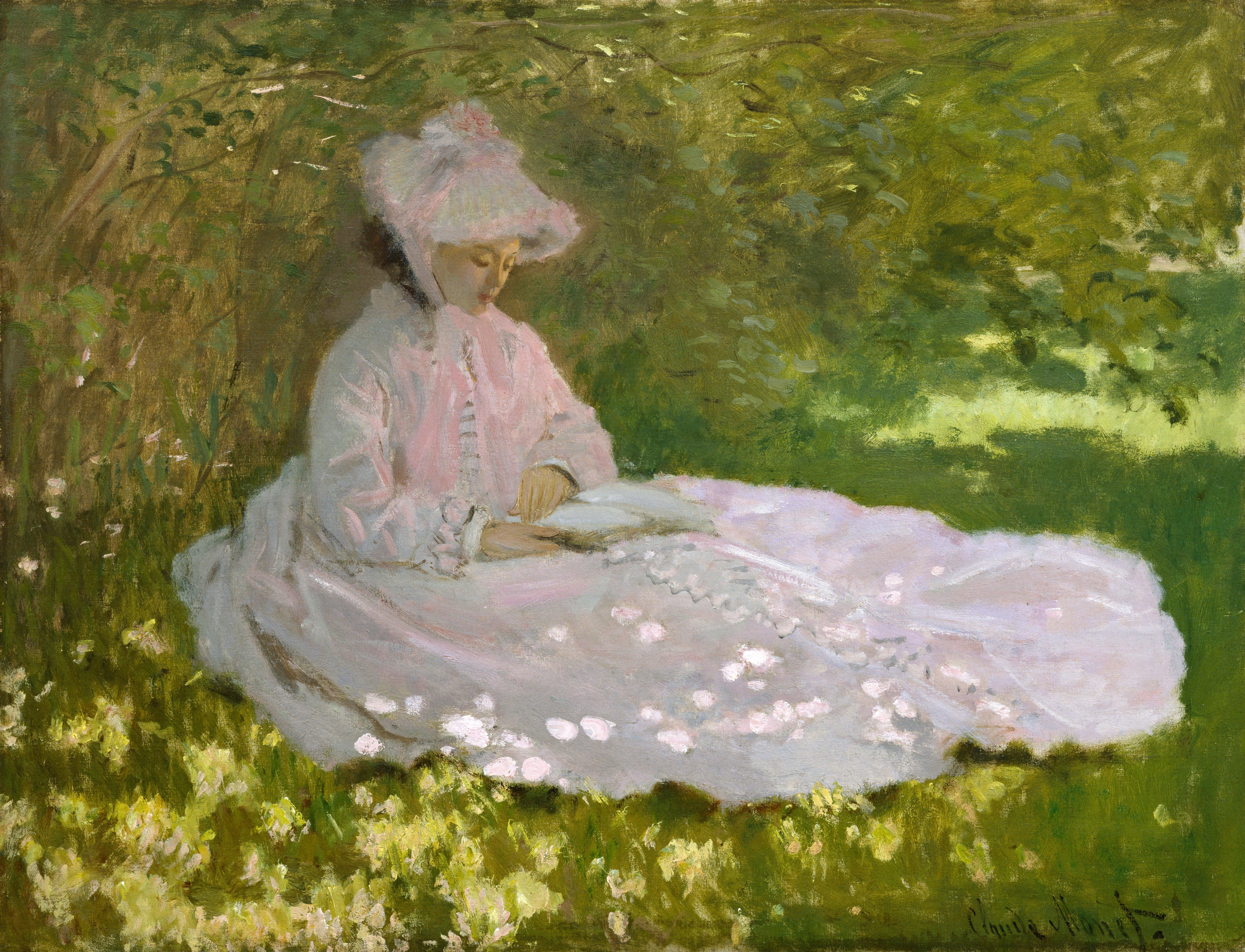
Claude Monet, Springtime, c. 1872

In Dutch Golden Age painting, female readers were depicted as part of the genre of the everyday, often engaged with letters. Johannes Vermeer, for example, created numerous works around this subject, including A Woman in Blue Reading a Letter and Girl Reading a Letter at an Open Window. Despite this apparent acceptance of women readers, scholars have determined that the letters including in Dutch painting were almost exclusively love letters. As Conlon argues, the self-reflective act of reading becomes conflated in these depictions with distraction and longing for someone - presumably a male lover - ultimately undermining the subjectivity of the woman reader.

Male artists have also depicted women readers within pastoral settings, like in Claude Monet's Springtime, perhaps in an attempt to tame or domesticate the otherwise wild act of reading.

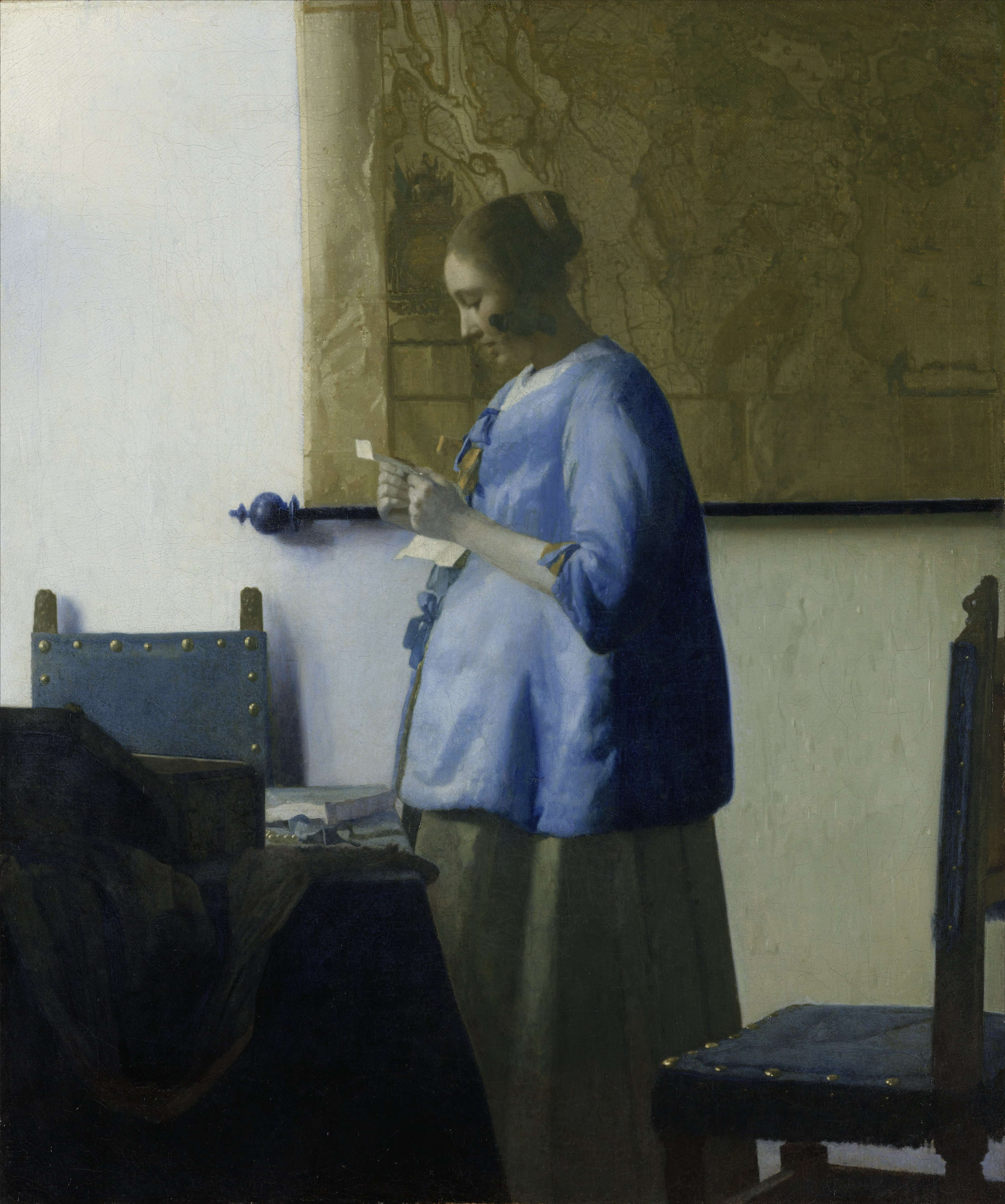
Woman in Blue Reading a Letter, ca. 1662-1663, Johannes Vermeer

== Female artists and the subject of reading ==
Female artists have also been drawn to the subject of women readers. These artists' depictions of reading often differ from their male counterparts, demonstrating the complexity of the topic. Mary Cassatt's Family Group Reading is a powerful representation of women readers who demonstrate subjectivity and serious literary engagement. All three are fixated on the text, and Cassatt may be emphasizing that reading comes just as naturally to women as motherhood, by painting the young girl encircled by the woman's arms and drawn literally into the book.

== See also ==
- Madonna of the Book, c.1480, Sandro Botticelli
- The Reading, 1877, by Henri Fantin-Latour
- A Young Girl Reading, c. 1776, Jean-Honoré Fragonard
- Category:Books in art
