= Reading for special needs =

Area of special education

Reading for special needs has become an area of interest as the understanding of reading has improved. Teaching children with special needs how to read was not historically pursued under the assumption of the reading readiness model that a reader must learn to read in a hierarchical manner such that one skill must be mastered before learning the next skill (e.g. a child might be expected to learn the names of the letters in the alphabet in the correct order before being taught how to read their name). This approach often led to teaching sub-skills of reading in a decontextualized manner, preventing students with special needs from progressing to more advanced literacy lessons and subjecting them to repeated age-inappropriate instruction (e.g. singing the alphabet song).

During the 1970s, the education system shifted to targeting functional skills that were age-appropriate for people with special needs. This led to teaching sight words that were viewed as necessary for participation in the school and community (e.g. exit, danger, poison, go). This approach was an improvement upon previous practices, but it limited the range of literacy skills that people with special needs developed.

A newer model for reading development, the "emergent literacy" or "early literacy" model, purports that children begin reading from birth and that learning to read is an interactive process based on children's exposure to literate activities. It is under this new model that children with developmental disabilities and special needs have been considered to be able to learn to read.

== Populations at increased risk ==
Children with language difficulties that fall below expectations for their chronological age are at increased risk for reading disorders or difficulties that can occur early in preschool and continue throughout development. Children with other disabilities, such as developmental disability, autism spectrum disorder, Down syndrome, fragile X syndrome, and cerebral palsy, can also have language impairments that raise the risk of developing reading problems.

=== Down syndrome ===
It has been found true for children with intellectual disabilities, such as children with Down syndrome, that phonological awareness skills are often deficient and require targeted teaching. For example, studies have found that children with Down syndrome show deficits in phonological awareness, and though they can develop such skills, often rely on sight word vocabulary knowledge rather than phonological awareness skills to decode words. Given this, it is recommended that phonological awareness skills be taught in a systematic manner with explicit instruction of how to use these skills when reading.

=== Autism ===
Children with autism spectrum disorder (ASD) have been identified as having particular difficulties with reading comprehension despite normal decoding abilities. Historically, those individuals who are especially good at decoding but have poor comprehension are considered to have hyperlexia. Not all individuals with autism, however, are poor comprehenders as there is a wide range of abilities in children on the spectrum. Despite the type of reader an individual with autism might be, individuals should be given the opportunity to learn to read. Very few studies have examined the effectiveness of interventions for reading for individuals with ASD. Using computer-assisted instruction to implement programs for individuals with ASD that target skills in decoding could be an effective way to help improve these skills in these individuals. Procedural facilitation tasks such as prereading questions, anaphoric cuing, or a cloze task helped to improve reading comprehension with the anaphoric cuing task being the most effective task.

=== Cerebral palsy ===
Children with cerebral palsy (CP) may or may not have motor speech impairments and/or language impairments, which can lead to reading difficulties. Often children with CP can be classified as having severe speech and physical impairments (SSPI), but children with other disorders can fall into this category as well. Children with SSPI can be at increased risk for reading difficulties not only because they may have language impairments, but also because they can have limited literary experiences and limited reading instruction. Additionally, parents and teachers may have low expectations of the child's ability to become a reader, which may influence experiences with text and impact literacy instruction. Assistive technology (also Alternative and Augmentative Communication devices; AAC) can be used to overcome physical barriers to manipulating books, and to augment speech motor and language difficulties (e.g., type, or select symbols to identify rhyming words), and cognitive impairments (to provide needed support required for target skill acquisition) (Copeland & Keef, 2007, see chapter 9). Of course, access to assistive devices is not sufficient for reading development. Appropriate reading instruction is required (e.g., instruction in phonological awareness skills, phonemic awareness skills, phonics, fluency, vocabulary, text comprehension, and book conventions), regularly conducted story reading sessions, constructive AT/AAC use to target literacy skills, high expectations of student literacy achievement, and text-rich environments have been found to be important for developing literacy skills in children with CP.

== Interventions ==
Classroom teachers are expected to provide the primary source of reading instruction for most students. Special education teachers may supplement the classroom instruction in reading and writing skills based on the independent performance of their students. Other professionals including a reading specialist, a speech-language pathologist, an educational or school psychologist, and an occupational therapist may also provide reading and writing support to individuals with reading and writing difficulties.

People with severe speech difficulties can use augmentative and alternative communication (AAC) devices. AAC proponents insist that AAC enables such individuals to express needs, wants, and ideas. Evidence indicates that few AAC users are able to progress to a second grade literacy level and many do not become conventionally "literate" at all.

== See also ==
- Reading
- Right to Read inquiry report
- Structured literacy
