= Simple view of reading =

Scientific theory of Reading Comprehension

The simple view of reading is that reading is the product of decoding and language comprehension.

In this context,

- “reading” refers to “reading comprehension”,
- “decoding” is simply recognition of written words
- and “language comprehension” means understanding language, whether spoken or written.

Decoding (D) x (Oral) Language Comprehension (LC) = Reading Comprehension (RC)

The parts of the equation are:

(D) Decoding: Converting written words into spoken language

(LC) Language (listening) comprehension: understanding the meaning of the words in context (as if they had been spoken out loud).

(RC) Reading comprehension: understanding the meaning of the written words in context.

To be clear, all of this can be done while doing silent reading.

The equation asserts the following:

- If a reader can decode the words in a text accurately and understands the meaning of those words in context, they will be able to understand the text (i.e. reading comprehension).
- If a reader can decode the words accurately, but does not understand the meaning of the words in context, they will not have reading comprehension. (e.g. A reader who can decode the word “etymology” but does not know what it means, will not achieve reading comprehension.)
- If a reader cannot decode the words accurately, yet understands the meaning of those words in context, they will not have reading comprehension. (e.g. A reader who knows what a tyrannosaurus rex is, but cannot decode the words, will not achieve reading comprehension.)

The simple view of reading was originally described by psychologists Philip Gough and William Tunmer in 1986 and modified by Wesley Hoover and Philip Gough in 1990; and has led to significant advancements in our understanding of reading comprehension.

== Research basis ==
=== First publication ===
The simple view was first described by Gough and Tunmer in the feature article of the first 1986 issue of the journal Remedial and Special Education. Their aim was to set out a falsifiable theory that would settle the debate about the relationship between decoding skill and reading ability. They define decoding as the ability to read isolated words “quickly, accurately, and silently” and dependent fundamentally on the knowledge of the correspondence between letters and their sounds.

In setting out the simple view, Gough and Tunmer were responding to an ongoing dispute among psychologists, researchers and educationalists about the contribution of decoding to reading comprehension. Some, such as Ken Goodman (credited with creating the theory of Whole Language) had downplayed the role of decoding in skilled reading. He believed it was only one of several cues used by proficient readers in a “psycholinguistic guessing game.” He viewed decoding as, at best, a by-product of skilled reading and not at the core of skilled reading as maintained by Gough and Tunmer.

This dispute was one front of what came to be known as the reading wars, a protracted and often heated series of debates about aspects of reading research, instruction and policy during the twentieth century. In proposing the simple view, Gough and Tunmer hoped that the use of the scientific method would resolve the debate about the connection between decoding and comprehension.

Apart from providing a focus for the debate over decoding, the authors felt the simple view had important insights into reading disability. If reading ability results only from the product of decoding and listening comprehension, reading disability could result in three different ways: an inability to decode (dyslexia), an inability to comprehend (hyperlexia), or both (which they term “garden variety reading disability”).

=== Empirical support ===
The original empirical support for the simple view came from multiple regression studies showing the independent contributions of decoding and linguistic comprehension to silent reading comprehension. Since first publication, the theory has been tested in over 100 studies in several languages with learners having various disabilities.

In their 2018 review of the science of learning to read, psychologists Anne Castles, Kathleen Rastle and Kate Nation write that "The logical case for the Simple View is clear and compelling: Decoding and linguistic comprehension are both necessary, and neither is sufficient alone. A child who can decode print but cannot comprehend is not reading; likewise, regardless of the level of linguistic comprehension, reading cannot happen without decoding." Further, studies show that decoding and linguistic comprehension together account for almost all the variance in reading comprehension and its development.

== Visualizations ==
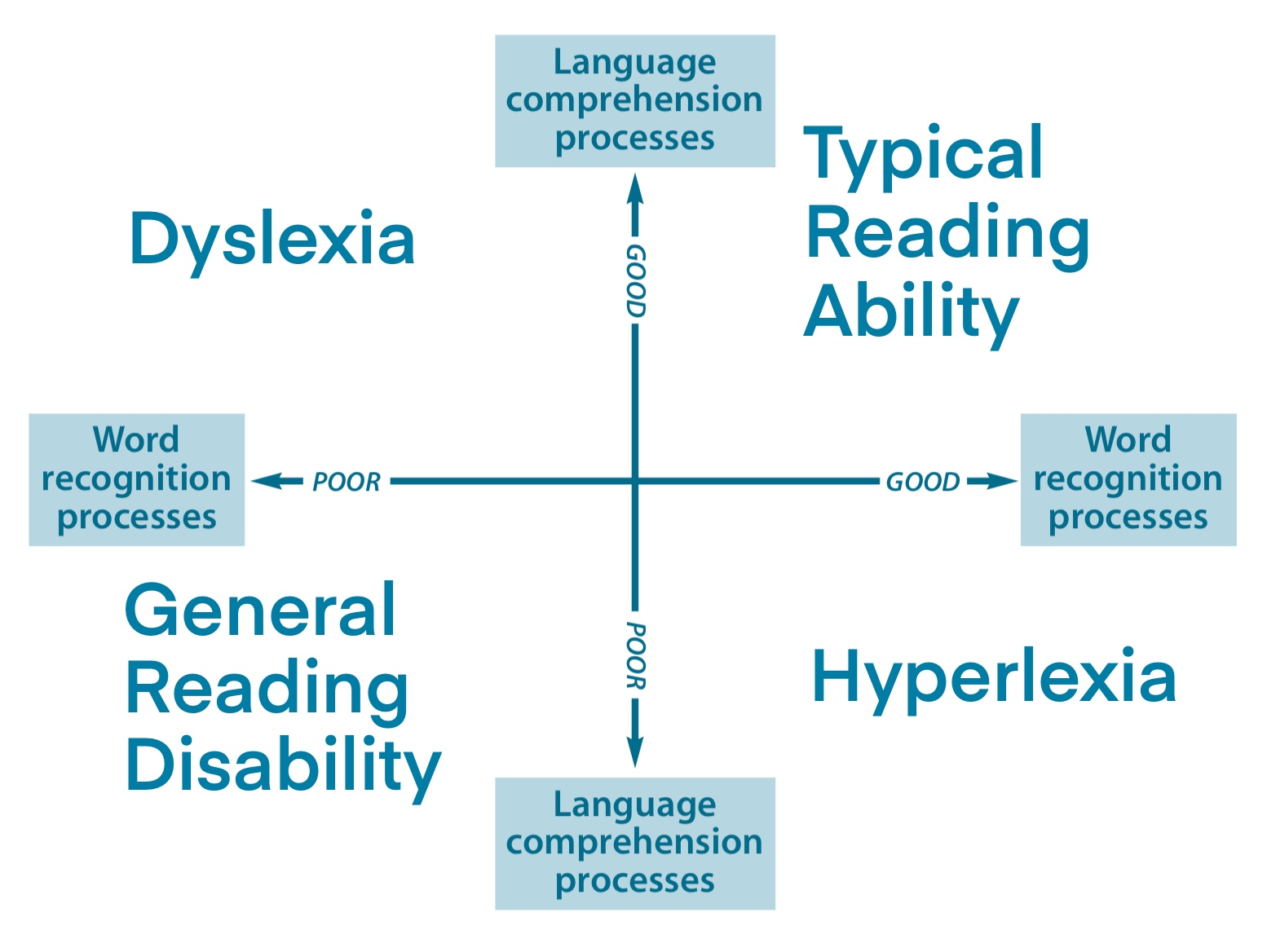
The Simple View of Reading proposes four broad categories of developing readers: typical readers; poor readers; dyslexics; and hyperlexics.

=== Quadrants ===
By placing the two cognitive processes on intersecting axes, the theory predicts four categories of readers:

- Readers with poor decoding skills but relatively preserved listening comprehension skills would be considered 'poor decoders', or dyslexic;
- Readers with poor listening comprehension skills are referred to as 'poor comprehenders';
- Readers with poor decoding skills and poor listening comprehension skills are considered 'poor readers', or sometimes referred to as 'garden-variety poor readers'; and
- Readers who have good decoding and listening comprehension skills are considered 'typical readers'.

=== The reading rope ===
The reading rope is a visualization of the simple view published by psychologist Hollis Scarborough in 2001, showing the interactivity of decoding and language comprehension (and their sub-components) in producing fluent reading comprehension. By depicting strands winding together to form 'the rope' of skilled reading, the visualization expands the simple view to include the cognitive sub-components (Language Comprehension and Word Recognition) as integral to the process of skilled reading.

== In education ==
Psychologist David A. Kilpatrick writes that the simple view of reading is not just for researchers. It is also helpful to school psychologists, teachers, and curriculum coordinators in understanding the reading process, identifying the source of reading difficulties, and developing lesson plans." Others have noted that, by distinguishing the two components of reading comprehension, the simple view assists teachers by showing that their students may differ in their abilities in the two components and therefore require different teaching strategies to support their reading development.

=== England ===
In 2006, the Independent Review of the Teaching of Early Reading (the Rose Report) recommended that the simple view be adopted as the underlying conceptual framework informing early reading instruction in England for practitioners and researchers." The review recommended that the Simple View be used to "reconstruct" the searchlights (or cueing) model that had informed the 1998 National Literacy Strategy for England, saying it should incorporate both word recognition and language comprehension as "distinct processes related one to the other."

== Limitations ==
In 2018, Castles, Rastle and Nation noted the following limitations of the simple view of reading:

Although the Simple View is a useful framework, it can only take us so far. First, it is not a model: It does not tell us how decoding and linguistic comprehension operate or how they develop. Second, in testing predictions of the Simple View, the field has been inconsistent in how the key constructs are defined and measured. In relation to decoding, as Gough and Tunmer (1986) themselves noted, it can refer to the overt “sounding out” of a word or to skilled word recognition, and measures vary accordingly. In relation to linguistic comprehension, measures used have ranged from vocabulary to story retell, inference making, and verbal short-term memory. To fully understand reading development, we need more precise models that detail the cognitive processes operating within the decoding and linguistic comprehension components of the Simple View.

== See also ==
- Dual-route hypothesis to reading aloud
- Dyslexia
- Hyperlexia
- Learning to read
- Reading
- Science of reading
