= Teaching Reading, National Inquiry into the Teaching of Literacy =

2005 National Inquiry into the Teaching of Literacy (Australia)

Teaching Reading, National Inquiry into the Teaching of Literacy, published in December 2005, is a review of practices in the literacy acquisition of Australian school children.

A key objective of the Australian government is to achieve sustained improvements in the literacy and numeracy skills of Australian children. For more than 40 years, a feature of literacy teaching in English-speaking countries had been the disagreements among scholars about how beginning readers should be taught. Some educators advocated for whole-language approaches, whereas many cognitive scientists argued for explicit, systematic instruction in phonics.

A letter from 26 Australian psychologists and reading researchers maintained that the predominant whole-language approach to teaching reading is not based on evidence-based practices and is "ineffective and inappropriate". They argued that effective initial reading instruction would substantially reduce the need for costly remedial programs for underachieving children.

As a result, the Australian Government Minister for Education, Science, and Training formed a committee to inquire into current teaching practices. The committee was chaired by Ken Rowe, research director at the Australian Council for Educational Research (ACER). It was instructed to inquire about the following:

- teaching of reading in Australian schools,
- assessment of reading proficiency, including the identification of children with reading difficulties, and
- teacher education and whether it prepares teachers adequately for reading instruction.

== Notable mentions ==
Teaching Reading, National Inquiry into the Teaching of Literacy has been reviewed in the following:

- Department of Education, Science and Training, Australia
- The Australian Council for Educational Research (ACER)
- The Australian Journal of Learning Disabilities.
- The International Journal of Progressive Education.
- Centre for Education Statistics and Evaluation, NSW Department of Education
- Department of Education, University of Tasmania, Australia
- The academy for the science of instruction
- Academia
- APM Reports, At a Loss for Words
- World Economic Forum

== Conclusions ==
The inquiry reached the following conclusions:

- "The evidence is clear", from research and good practice, that "direct systematic instruction in phonics during the early years of schooling is an essential foundation for teaching children to read".
- All students learn best when teachers adopt an integrated approach to reading that "explicitly teaches phonemic awareness, phonics, fluency, vocabulary knowledge, and comprehension".
- A whole-language approach to the teaching of reading "on its own is not in the best interests of children, particularly those experiencing reading difficulties".
- "Where there is unsystematic or no phonics instruction, children’s literacy progress is significantly impeded".

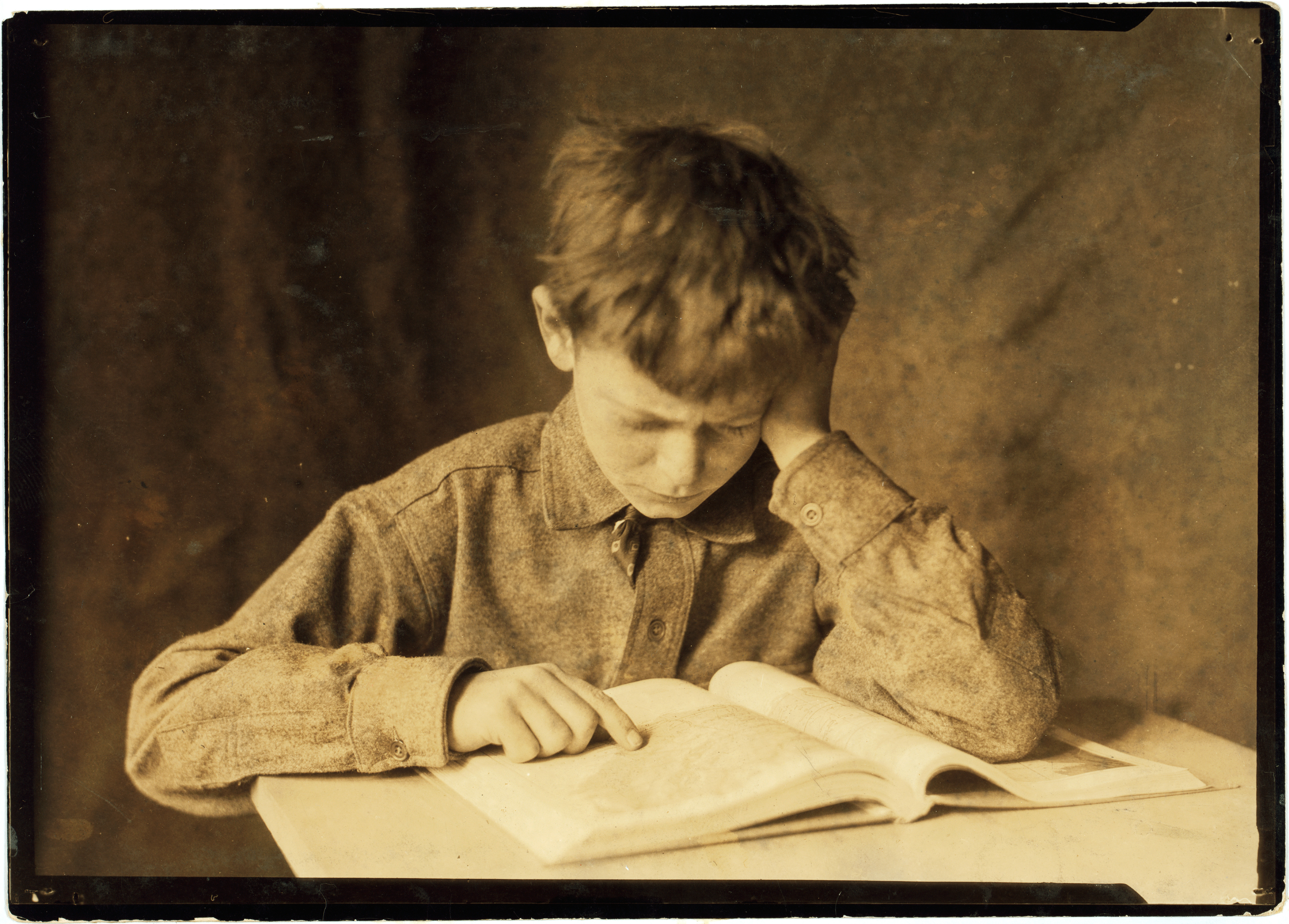
Boy studying

== Recommendations ==
The report has the following 20 recommendations:

1) Teachers use teaching strategies that are based on rigorous, evidence-based research that are effective in enhancing the literacy development of all children.

2) Teachers provide systematic, direct, and explicit phonics instruction so that children master the essential alphabetic code-breaking skills for proficient reading. In addition, teachers should support the development of oral language, vocabulary, grammar, reading fluency, comprehension, and the literacies of new technologies.

3) Literacy teaching should be taught from kindergarten to grade 12, in all areas of the curriculum, to meet the needs of children from diverse backgrounds and locations.

4) Parents and carers receive programs, guides, and workshops to provide support for their children's literacy development.

5) School leaders put in place an explicit, whole-school literacy planning, monitoring, and reviewing process.

6) All schools identify a highly trained specialist literacy teacher to be responsible for supporting school staff.

7) Higher education providers offer specialist postgraduate studies in literacy (especially in teaching reading).

8) Teaching Australia, in consultation with others, develops and implements national standards for literacy, teaching, and initial teacher registration.

9) Every child receives comprehensive, diagnostic, and developmentally appropriate assessments.

10) A confidential mechanism should be established to monitor children's progress throughout schooling.

11) The key objective of primary teacher education courses is to prepare student teachers to teach reading, using evidence-based findings on how to teach phonemic awareness, phonics, fluency, vocabulary knowledge, and text comprehension, and child and adolescent development.

12) Secondary teachers are trained to continue the literacy development of their students in all areas of the curriculum.

13) Pre-service teachers are prepared to teach literacy, and especially reading, to diverse groups of children.

14) The Committee recommends that teacher graduates from all primary and secondary teacher education programs demonstrate the ability to teach literacy within the framework of their employment/teaching program.

15) Teachers are provided with ongoing opportunities for evidence-based professional learning about effective literacy teaching.

16) A national program should be established to provide teachers with training in evidence-based practices.

17) The Australian, State, and Territory governments’ approaches to literacy improvement should be aligned.

18) The Australian Government, State and Territory governments, and non-government education authorities jointly support the proposed national program for literacy action.

19) The Australian Government Minister for Education, Science and Training will raise these recommendations as issues for attention and action by those who will be responsible for implementing the recommendations.

20) The Progress in implementing these recommendations, and on the state of literacy in Australia, should be reported every two years.

== Reception ==
- The Australian Council for Educational Research (ACER) published a review of the report.
- The Australian Journal of Learning Disabilities published an article about the report.
- Literacy Teaching and Learning published an article entitled Extreme(s) Makeover: Countering False Dichotomies of Literacy Education in the Australian Context
- The Academy for the Science of Instruction (Australia) lists Teaching Reading, National Inquiry into the Teaching of Literacy as a "key report".
- The ACT Alliance for Evidence-Based Education lists Teaching Reading, National Inquiry into the Teaching of Literacy as a "Critical report".
- The Educator (Australia) reviewed Teaching Reading, National Inquiry into the Teaching of Literacy, on their website.
- The Reading Recovery Council of North America published an article that addresses the conclusion by some, based on the National Inquiry into the Teaching of Literacy, that teachers in Australia do not teach phonics.
- The Centre for Education Statistics and Evaluation, NSW Department of Education, published a review of the National Inquiry into the Teaching of Literacy.
- ABC news published an opinion paper about the National Inquiry into the Teaching of Literacy, on September 3, 2013.
- The International Journal of Progressive Education published a report entitled Whole language and moral panic in Australia, in which it refers to the National Inquiry into the Teaching of Literacy.
- The government of the State of Victoria, Australia, refers to the National Inquiry into the Teaching of Literacy in its Literacy teaching toolkit for early childhood.

== See also ==
- Evidence-based education
- Independent review of the teaching of early reading (Rose Report 2006)
- National Reading Panel
- Phonics
- Primary education
- Reading
- Reading comprehension
- Reading disability
- Reading for special needs
- Right to Read inquiry report
- Simple view of reading
- Structured literacy
- Synthetic phonics
