= Phonological deficit hypothesis =

Hypothesis for the cognitive cause of dyslexia

The phonological deficit hypothesis is a prevalent cognitive-level explanation for the cause of reading difficulties and dyslexia. The hypothesis is based on evidence that individuals with dyslexia tend to do poorly on tests which measure their ability to decode nonsense words using conventional phonetic rules, and that there is a high correlation between difficulties in connecting the sounds of language to letters (phonemic awareness) and reading delays or failure in children.

== Overview ==
The basic hypothesis is that reading failure or dyslexia stems from a functional or structural deficit in left hemispheric brain areas associated with processing the sounds of language. Some researchers have studied the structure and function of neural pathways in the language areas of the brain. Others have focused on the perception of short or rapidly varying sounds of language, positing that the core deficit is one of timing rather than of overall function.

Since the 1990s, the phonological deficit hypothesis has been the dominant explanation favored by researchers as to the probable cause of dyslexia, but it is only one of several competing theories. Critics of the phonological hypothesis point out that it fails to account for symptoms of dyslexia unrelated to phonetic decoding difficulties, such as problems with short-term memory, visual processing issues, or difficulties with balance and small motor coordination that are common to many dyslexic children and adults. They also argue that much of the evidence for the theory is based on circular reasoning, in that phonological weakness is seen as both a defining symptom of dyslexia and as its underlying cause.

== See also ==
- Auditory processing disorder
- Phoneme
- Phonemic awareness
- Phonics
- Phonology
- Pseudoword
- Reading
- Synthetic phonics
