= Phonological awareness =

Awareness of the sound structure of words

Phonological awareness is an individual's awareness of the phonological structure, or sound structure, of words. Phonological awareness is an important and reliable predictor of later reading ability and therefore has been the focus of much research.

== Overview ==
Phonological awareness involves the detection and manipulation of sounds at three levels of sound structure: (1) syllables, (2) onsets and rimes, and (3) phonemes. Awareness of these sounds is demonstrated through a variety of tasks (see below). Available published tests of phonological awareness (for example PhAB2) are often used by teachers, psychologists and speech therapists to help understand difficulties in this aspect of language and literacy. Although the tasks vary, they share the basic requirement that some operation (e.g., identifying, comparing, separating, combining, generating) be performed on the sounds. It is assumed that the individual performing these tasks must have awareness of the units of sound in order to perform the operation.

Phonological awareness is one component of a larger phonological processing system used for speaking and listening. Phonological awareness is different from other phonological abilities in that it is a metalinguistic skill, requiring conscious awareness and reflection on the structure of language. Other phonological abilities such as attending to speech, discriminating between sounds, and holding sounds in memory, can be performed without conscious reflection. However, these other phonological abilities are prerequisites to the development of phonological awareness. Therefore, general listening skills are often among those included in phonological awareness instruction.

The terms phonemic awareness and phonics are often used interchangeably with phonological awareness. However, these terms have different meanings. Phonemic awareness is a subset of phonological awareness that focuses specifically on recognizing and manipulating phonemes, the smallest units of sound. Phonics requires students to know and match letters or letter patterns with sounds, learn the rules of spelling, and use this information to decode (read) and encode (write) words. Phonemic awareness relates only to speech sounds, not to alphabet letters or sound-spellings, so it is not necessary for students to have alphabet knowledge in order to develop a basic phonemic awareness of language.

Phonological awareness tasks (adapted from Virginia Department of Education (1998): and Gillon (2004)

Listening skills

The ability to attend to and distinguish environmental and speech sounds from one another

- Alertness: Awareness and localization of sounds
- Discrimination: Recognize same/different sounds
- Memory: Recollection of sounds and sound patterns
- Sequencing: Identify order of what was heard
- Figure-ground: Isolate one sound from background of other sounds
- Perception: Comprehension of sounds heard

Syllable-structure awareness tasks

- Syllable segmentation: e.g., "How many syllables (or parts) are in the word coffee?"
- Syllable completion: e.g., "Here is a picture of a rabbit. I'll say the first part of the word. Can you finish the word ra_____?"
- Syllable identity: e.g., "Which part of complete and compare sound the same?"
- Syllable deletion: e.g., "Say finish. Now say it again without the fin"

Onset-rime awareness tasks

- Spoken word recognition: e.g., "Do these words rhyme: shell bell?"
- Spoken rhyme detection or rhyme oddity task: e.g., "Which word does not rhyme: fish, dish, hook?"
- Spoken rhyme generation: e.g., "Tell me words that rhyme with bell."
- Onset-rime blending

Phonemic awareness tasks

- Alliteration awareness (a.k.a. phoneme detection and sound or phoneme categorization): e.g., "Which word has a different first sound: bed, bus, chair, ball?"
- Phoneme matching: e.g., "Which word begins with the same sound as bat: horn, bed, cup?"
- Phoneme isolation: e.g., "Tell me the sound you hear at the beginning of the word food"
- Phoneme completion: e.g., "Here is a picture of a watch. Finish the word for me: wa_____ "
- Phoneme blending with words or non-words: e.g., "What word do these sounds make: m...oo...n?"
- Phoneme deletion, also referred to as phoneme elision: e.g., "Say coat. Now say it again but don't say /k/"
- Phoneme segmentation with words or non-words: e.g., "How many sounds can you hear in the word it?
- Phoneme reversal: e.g., "Say na (as in nap). Now say na backwards"
- Phoneme manipulation: e.g., "Say dash. Now say it again, but instead of /æ/ say /I/"
- Spoonerism: e.g., felt made becomes melt fade

== Development ==
Although some two-year-old children demonstrate phonological awareness, for most children, phonological awareness appears in the third year, with accelerating growth through the fourth and fifth years. Phonological awareness skills develop in a predictable pattern similar across languages progressing from larger to smaller units of sound (that is, from words to syllables to onsets and syllable rimes to phonemes). Tasks used to demonstrate awareness of these sounds have their own developmental sequence. For example, tasks involving the detection of similar or dissimilar sounds (e.g., oddity tasks) are mastered before tasks requiring the manipulation of sounds (e.g., deletion tasks), and blending tasks are mastered before segmenting tasks. The acquisition of phonological awareness skills does not progress in a linear sequence; rather, children continue to refine skills they have acquired while they learn new skills.

The development of phonological awareness is closely tied to overall language and speech development. Vocabulary size, as well as other measures of receptive and expressive semantics, syntax, and morphology, are consistent concurrent and longitudinal predictors of phonological awareness. Consistent with this finding, children with communication disorders often have poor phonological awareness.

Phonological development and articulatory accuracy is often correlated to phonological awareness skills, both for children with typical speech and those with disordered speech. In addition to milestones of speech and language development, speech and language processing abilities are also related to phonological awareness: both speech perception and verbal short-term memory have been concurrently and predicatively correlated with phonological awareness abilities.

== Phonological awareness and reading ==
Phonological awareness is an important determiner of success in learning to read and spell. For most children, strong readers have strong phonological awareness, and poor readers have poor phonological awareness skills. Phonological awareness skills in the preschool and kindergarten years also strongly predict how well a child will read in the school years. In addition, interventions to improve phonological awareness abilities lead to significantly improved reading abilities. Phonological awareness instruction improves reading and spelling skills, but the reverse is also true: literacy instruction improves phonological awareness skills. The relationship between phonological awareness and reading abilities changes over time. All levels of phonological awareness ability (syllable, onset-rhyme, and phoneme) contribute to reading abilities in the Kindergarten through second grade. However, beyond the second grade, phoneme-level abilities play a stronger role.

Phonological awareness and literacy is often explained by decoding and encoding. In reading, decoding refers to the process of relating a word's written representation to its verbal representation. Especially in the early stages of reading, decoding involves mapping letters in the word to their corresponding sounds, and then combining those sounds to form a verbal word. Encoding: a process used in spelling: is similar, although the process goes in the opposite direction, with the word's verbal representation is encoded in a written form. Again, especially in the early stages of reading, encoding involves determining the sounds in a verbal word, and then mapping those sounds onto a letter sequence in order to spell out the written word. In both encoding and decoding, phonological awareness is needed because the child must know the sounds in the words in order to relate them to the letter sounds.

== Intervention ==
Phonological awareness is an auditory skill that is developed through a variety of activities that expose students to the sound structure of the language and teach them to recognize, identify and manipulate it. Listening skills are an important foundation for the development of phonological awareness and they generally develop first. Therefore, the scope and sequence of instruction in early childhood literacy curriculum typically begins with a focus on listening, as teachers instruct children to attend to and distinguish sounds, including environmental sounds and the sounds of speech. Early phonological awareness instruction also involves the use of songs, nursery rhymes and games to help students to become alert to speech sounds and rhythms, rather than meanings, including rhyme, alliteration, onomatopoeia, and prosody. While exposure to different sound patterns in songs and rhymes is a start towards developing phonological awareness, exposure in itself is not enough, because the traditional actions that go along with songs and nursery rhymes typically focus on helping students to understand the meanings of words, not attend to the sounds. Therefore, different strategies must be implemented to aid students in becoming alert to sounds instead. Specific activities that involve students in attending to and demonstrating recognition of the sounds of language include waving hands when rhymes are heard, stomping feet along with alliterations, clapping the syllables in names, and slowly stretching out arms when segmenting words. Phonological awareness is technically only about sounds and students do not need to know the letters of the alphabet to be able to develop phonological awareness.

Students in primary education sometimes learn phonological awareness in the context of literacy activities, particularly phonemic awareness. Some research demonstrates that, at least for older children, there may be utility to extending the development of phonological awareness skills in the context of activities that involve letters and spelling. A number of scholars have been working on this approach.

== See also ==
- Auditory processing disorder
- Dyslexia
- Phonological deficit hypothesis
