= Joseph Torgesen =

American professor

Joseph Torgesen is an Emeritus Professor of Psychology and Education at Florida State University. At the time of his retirement from the university in 2008, he was the W. Russell and Eugenia Morcom Chair of Psychology and Education and Director of the Florida Center for Reading Research.

== Education and Career ==
Torgesen received his Ph.D. in Developmental and Clinical Psychology from the University of Michigan in 1976, and served on the Psychology faculty at FSU from 1976 until 2008.

Torgesen's early research focused on memory processes in children with learning disabilities, but most of his career was spent investigating and writing about the language difficulties of children with specific developmental reading disabilities (dyslexia).

He is the author or co-author of over 230 books, book chapters, and articles on the psychology of reading, reading disabilities, and reading instruction. His works have been cited over 54,000 times according to Google Scholar. He is also the author, with Richard Wagner and Carol Rashotte, of two of the most widely used diagnostic tests for dyslexia, The Comprehensive Test of Phonological Processes and the Test of Word Reading Efficiency.

In 2002, Torgesen was asked by Governor Jeb Bush of Florida to establish a center for reading research at Florida State University. Since its establishment in 2002, the Florida Center for Reading Research has grown to become one of the leading research centers in reading in the world, with 9 permanent faculty and over 300 current employees.

While serving as director of FCRR, Torgesen also directed the Eastern Regional Reading First Technical Assistance Center (2003–2008) and served as Director of Reading for the National Center on K–12 Instruction in Reading, Math, and Science.

Torgesen has also served on advisory boards for organizations such as the International Dyslexia Association, the National Center for Learning Disabilities, and the Haan Foundation for Children. In 2004, he was appointed by the U.S. Secretary of Education to serve on the U.S. Commission to UNESCO, and from 2004 to 2008 he served as a member of the National Educational Sciences Board (Board of Directors for the Institute for Education Sciences).

== Research ==
Torgesen's early research focused on memory processes in children with learning disabilities, but most of his career was spent investigating and writing about the language difficulties of children with specific developmental reading disabilities (dyslexia).

He is the author or co-author of over 230 books, book chapters, and articles on the psychology of reading, reading disabilities, and reading instruction. His works have been cited over 54,000 times according to Google Scholar. He is also the author, with Richard Wagner and Carol Rashotte, of two of the most widely used diagnostic tests for dyslexia, The Comprehensive Test of Phonological Processes and the Test of Word Reading Efficiency.

Torgesen’s research has helped to shape current scientific understanding of reading acquisition and reading disabilities, particularly dyslexia.

Working extensively on phonological processing, he demonstrated that phonemic awareness, in particular, is a strong predictor of later reading success and plays a causal role in learning to read.

Torgesen emphasized the importance of early identification and intensive intervention, arguing that effective, research-based instruction combining phonemic awareness, phonics, fluency, vocabulary, and comprehension could prevent most reading failures.

His widely cited publications, such as Catch Them Before They Fall and Avoiding the Devastating Downward Spiral, outlined how children who fail to master word recognition early are at risk of compounding deficits in comprehension and academic achievement. Beyond prevention, he investigated remedial interventions for severely impaired readers, including those resistant to typical treatments, and explored the use of technology-based instructional programs. Torgesen also contributed to the development of influential diagnostic assessments, including the Comprehensive Test of Phonological Processing (CTOPP) and the Test of Word Reading Efficiency (TOWRE), which remain standard tools for identifying reading disabilities.

His findings on fluency and automatic word recognition further clarified their role in enabling comprehension by reducing cognitive load during reading. Collectively, his work not only advanced theoretical models of reading development but also influenced national literacy policy, large-scale programs such as Reading First, and practical guidelines for educators and school leaders seeking to implement effective early intervention strategies.

== Honors and recognition ==
- Developing Scholar Award, Florida State University (1980)
- Outstanding Research Award, Florida Association of School Psychologists (1982)
- Distinguished Research Career Award, American Educational Research Association, Special Interest Group for Special Education (1997)
- Sylvia O. Richardson Award for Service to Individuals with Learning Disabilities and Dyslexia (1998)
- Samuel A. Kirk Awards for exemplary research publications, Council for Exceptional Children (2000, 2001)
- The Samuel Torrey Orton Award for Excellence in Research, International Dyslexia Association (2006)
- Vires Torch Award, Florida State University Faculty Senate (2025)

== Select bibliography ==
- Wagner, Richard K.; Torgesen, Joseph K.; Rashotte, Carol A.; Pearson, Nils A. (2013). Comprehensive Test of Phonological Processing: CTOPP2 : Examiner's Manual. PRO-ED. ISBN 978-1-4886-9410-3.
- Torgesen, J.K., Wagner, R.K., & Rashotte, C.A. (2012). Test of Word Reading Efficiency, 2nd Edition. Austin, TX: Pro-ED, Inc.
- Torgesen, J.K., Wagner, R.K., Rashotte, C.A., Herron, J., & Lindamood, P. (2010). Computer-Assisted Instruction to prevent reading difficulties in students at risk for dyslexia: Outcomes from two instructional approaches, Annals of Dyslexia, published online Jan 6, 2010.
- Torgesen, J.K., Houston, D.D., Rissman, L.M., Decker, S.M., Roberts, G., Vaughn, S., Wexler, J., Francis, D.J., Rivera, M.O. (2007). Academic literacy instruction for adolescents: A guidance document from the Center on Instruction. Center on Instruction for K-12 Reading, Math, and Science. Portsmouth, NH
- Torgesen, J.K. & Hudson, R. (2006). Reading fluency: critical issues for struggling readers. In S.J. Samuels and A. Farstrup (Eds.). Reading fluency: The forgotten dimension of reading success. Newark, DE: International Reading Association
- King, R. & Torgesen, J.K. (2006). Improving the effectiveness of reading instruction in one elementary school: A description of the process. In Blaunstein, P. & Lyon, R. (Eds.) It Doesn’t Have to be This Way. Lanham, MD: Scarecrow Press, Inc.
- Torgesen, J.K. (2005). Recent discoveries from research on remedial interventions for children with dyslexia. In M. Snowling and C. Hulme (Eds.). The Science of Reading. (pp. 521–537). Oxford: Blackwell Publishers
- Torgesen, J.K. (2004). Avoiding the devastating downward spiral: The evidence that early intervention prevents reading failure. American Educator, 28, 6-19. Reprinted in the 56th Annual Commemorative Booklet of the International Dyslexia Association, November, 2005.
- Torgesen, J.K. (2004). Lessons Learned From the Last 20 Years of Research on Interventions for Students who Experience Difficulty Learning to Read. In McCardle, P. & Chhabra, V. (Eds.) The voice of evidence in reading research. Baltimore: Brookes Publishing.
- Torgesen, J.K. (2002). Empirical and theoretical support for direct diagnosis of learning disabilities by assessment of intrinsic processing weaknesses. In Bradley, R., Danielson, L., & Hallahan, D. (Eds.) Identification of Learning Disabilities: Research to practice.(pp. 565–613). Mahwah, NJ: Lawrence Erlbaum Associates.
- Torgesen, J.K., Rashotte, C.A., Alexander, A. (2001). Principles of fluency instruction in reading: Relationships with established empirical outcomes. In M. Wolf (Ed. ), Dyslexia, Fluency, and the Brain. pp. 333–355. Parkton, MD: York Press.
