= The Book of Learning and Forgetting =

1998 book by Frank Smith

- Author: Frank Smith
- Publication date: 1998
- ISBN: 080773750X

The Book of Learning and Forgetting (ISBN 080773750X) is a 1998 book in which author Frank Smith investigates the history of learning theories and the events that shaped our current educational structure.

Smith distinguishes between the "classical" and the "official" theories of learning. The classical view holds that people are constantly and effortlessly learning through immersion in a social community and its practices, and that this process of learning is universal. The official view suggests that learning requires effort, and that it only occurs when a student is being presented with the information. Standardized testing is closely associated with the official view.

Smith details the way in which the official view has gained acceptance despite its many negative results.
