= Frank Smith (psycholinguist) =

British psycholinguist (1928–2020)

Frank Smith (b. London, England, 1928–d. Victoria, British Columbia, Canada, 2020) was a British psycholinguist recognized for his contributions in linguistics and cognitive psychology. He was an essential contributor to research on the nature of the reading process together with researchers such as George Armitage Miller, Kenneth S. Goodman, Paul A. Kolers, Jane W. Torrey, Jane Mackworth, Richard Venezky, Robert Calfee, and Julian Hochberg. Smith and Goodman are founders of whole language approach for reading instruction. He was the author of numerous books.

== Life, career and education ==
Frank Smith was born in England in 1928 and lived on Vancouver Island, British Columbia, Canada. He started out as reporter and editor for several media publications in Europe and Australia before commencing undergraduate studies at the University of Western Australia. He received a PhD in Psycholinguistics from Harvard University in 1967.

Smith held positions as professor at the Ontario Institute for Studies in Education for twelve years, professor of language in education at the University of Victoria, British Columbia as well as professor and department head of applied English language studies at the University of the Witwatersrand, South Africa. Before taking the position at the Ontario Institute, Smith briefly worked at the Southwest Regional Laboratory in Los Alamitos, California.

He died on 29 December 2020, in Victoria, B.C.

== Research and work ==
Smith's research made important contributions to the development of reading theory. His book Understanding Reading: A Psycholinguistic Analysis of Reading and Learning to Read, originally published in 1971, is regarded as a fundamental text in the development of the now discredited whole language movement. Amongst others, Smith's research and writings in psycholinguistics inspired cognitive psychologists Keith Stanovich and Richard West's research into the role of context in reading.

Smith's work, in particular Understanding Reading: A Psycholinguistic Analysis of Reading and Learning to Read, is a synthesis of psycholinguistic and cognitive psychology research applied to reading. Working from diverse perspectives, Frank Smith and Kenneth S. Goodman developed the theory of a unified single reading process that comprises an interaction between reader, text and language. On the whole, Smith's writing challenges conventional teaching and diverts from popular assumptions about reading.

Apart from his research in language, his research interests included the psychological, social and cultural consequences of human technology.

=== Ideas ===
Smith advocated the concept that "children learn to read by reading". In 1975 he participated in a television documentary filmed by Stephen Rose for the BBC Horizon TV series while based at the Ontario Institute for Studies in Education. The programme focused on his work with a single 3 1/2-year-old child called Matthew.

He was against the 1970s idea that children should first learn the letters and letter combinations that convey the English language's forty-four sounds (Clymer's 45 phonic generalizations) and then they can read whole words by decoding them from their component phonemes. This "sounding out" words is a phonics, rather than a whole language, technique which is rooted in intellectual independence. The whole-language theory explained reading as a "language experience," where the reader interacts with the text/content and this in turn facilitates the link – "knowledge" – between the text and meaning. The emphasis is on the process or comprehension of the text.

== Books ==
- Smith, Frank (1973). Psycholinguistics and Reading. Thomson Learning. ISBN 978-0-03-091451-5.
- Smith, Frank (1975). Comprehension and Learning: A Conceptual Framework for Teachers. Holt McDougal. ISBN 978-0-03-011011-5.
- Smith, Frank (1985). Reading. Cambridge University Press. ISBN 978-0-521-31285-1.
- Smith, Frank (1986). Insult to Intelligence: The Bureaucratic Invasion of Our Classroom. Arbor House. ISBN 978-0-87795-827-7.
- Smith, Frank (1990). To Think. Teachers College Press. ISBN 978-0-8077-3057-7.
- Smith, Frank (1993). Whose Language? What Power?: A Universal Conflict in a South African Setting. Teachers College Press. ISBN 978-0-8077-3281-6.
- Smith, Frank (1994). Writing and the Writer. Routledge. ISBN 978-0-8058-1421-7.
- Smith, Frank (1994). Understanding Reading (5th ed.). Lawrence Erlbaum Associates. ISBN 978-0-8058-1419-4.
- Smith, Frank (1998). The Book of Learning and Forgetting. Teachers College Press. ISBN 978-0-8077-3750-7.
- Smith, Frank (2002). The Glass Wall: Why Mathematics Can Seem Difficult. Teachers College Press. ISBN 978-0-8077-4241-9.
- Smith, Frank (2003). Unspeakable Acts, Unnatural Practices: Flaws and Fallacies in Scientific Reading Instruction. Heinemann. ISBN 978-0-325-00619-2.
- Smith, Frank (2005). Reading Without Nonsense. Teachers College Press. ISBN 978-0-8077-4686-8.
- Smith, Frank (2006). Ourselves: Why We Are Who We Are. Lawrence Erlbaum Associates. ISBN 978-0-8058-5955-3.
- Smith, Frank (2007). Reading: FAQ. Teachers College Press. ISBN 978-0-8077-4785-8.

== Co-authored books ==
- Smith, Frank; Miller, George A (1968). The Genesis of Language: A Psycholinguistic Approach. MIT Press. ISBN 978-0-262-69022-5.
- Oberg, Antoinette; Goelman, Hillel; Smith, Frank (1984). Awakening to Literacy. Heinnemann Educational Books. ISBN 978-0-435-08207-9.

== Essays ==
- Smith, Frank (1983). Essays into Literacy: Selected Papers and Some Afterthoughts. Heinemann. ISBN 978-0-435-08205-5.
- Smith, Frank (1987). Joining the Literacy Club: Further Essays into Education. Heinemann. ISBN 978-0-435-08456-1.
- Smith, Frank (1995). Between Hope and Havoc: Essays into Human Learning and Education. Heinemann. ISBN 978-0-435-08857-6.
- Smith, Frank (2004). Understanding Reading: A Psycholinguistic Analysis of Reading and Learning to Read. Routledge. ISBN 978-0-8058-4712-3.

== Articles ==
- Smith, Frank (1989). "Overselling Literacy". The Phi Delta Kappan. 70 (5). Bloomington: Phi Delta Kappa International: 352–359.
- Smith, Frank (1992). "Learning to Read: The Never-Ending Debate". The Phi Delta Kappan. 73 (6). Bloomington: Phi Delta Kappa International: 432–441.
- Smith, Frank (1995). "Let's Declare Education a Disaster and Get in with Our Lives". The Phi Delta Kappan. 76 (8). Bloomington: Phi Delta Kappa International: 584–590.
- Smith, Frank (2001). "Just a Matter of Time". The Phi Delta Kappan. 82 (8). Bloomington: Phi Delta Kappa International: 572–576.

== Co-authored articles ==
- Smith, Frank; Lott, Deborah; Cronnell, Bruce (1969). "The Effect of Type Size and Case Alternation on Word Identification". The American Journal of Psychology. 82 (2). Illinois: University of Illinois Press: 248–253. doi:10.2307/1421250. JSTOR 1421250. PMID 5811185.
