= Test of Word Reading Efficiency =

Reading ability test

The Test of Word Reading Efficiency, commonly abbreviated as TOWRE–2 for its second edition, is a kind of reading test developed to test the efficiency of reading ability of children from age 6–24 years. It generally seeks to measure an individual's accuracy and fluency regarding two efficiencies; Sight Word Efficiency (SWE) and Phonemic Decoding Efficiency (PDE). SWE measures ability of pronouncing words that are printed and PDE assesses the quantity of pronouncing phonemically regular non-words. TOWRE–2 is a very simple test which can be administered by teachers and aides, and it only takes five minutes to complete the procedure. It is commonly used in reading research, classroom assessment and clinical practice. This test is both straightforward and easy to use because it does not require a lot of materials (i.e. stopwatch, pencil, and stimulus cards) and can be administered by teachers and aides.

== History ==
Test Of Word Efficiency (TOWRE) was first developed and published by Joseph K Torgesen, Richard Wagner and Carl Rashotte in 1999. After its popularity and acclamation, its second revision version was published in 2012 which is known as Test of Word Efficiency second edition (TOWRE–2). In beginning, Torgesen et al. sampled 1507 children, adolescents and young adults from 30 US states to form the measurement of TOWRE. Their ages ranged from 6 to 24 years. For TOWRE–2, Torgesen et al. sampled 1,700 children ranging from 6–24 years old from 13 states of US. The TOWRE-2 mostly focused on students in elementary school (through grade 5) as this population was expected to have its widest use.

There are few minor differences between TOWRE and TOWRE–2. The first edition of TOWRE had two subtests (A and B), however this second edition has four subtests (A,B,C and D). According to the inventors of this tests, the additional tests will help to monitor the current condition of the students and how well their reading instructions are helping.

== Format ==
Generally, there are two formats of this test which helps to understand the reading accuracy of the children and their ability to do it fluently. The test uses regular and irregular words, common and less common words, vowel digraphs, and orthographic units. The two sections that are used by TOWRE–2 are:

=== Sight Word Efficiency (SWE) ===
It uses vertically printed singlet list of 104 words from one to four syllables. The individual is given 45 seconds to pronounce as many of the words as they can from the list. The level of difficulty gradually increases from single syllables to multi-syllables and the administer measures how well the individual is pronouncing and how fast. This process of reading real words in 45 seconds helps to measure the capability of an individual to pronounce single sight words.

=== Phonemic Decoding Efficiency (PDE) ===
This subtest is more about measuring the ability of children to recognise unfamiliar words, pseudo-words or non-words. It uses 63 pseudo-words of one to three syllables and measures the children's efficiency of reading these words. The scores on this subtests helps researchers to understand the enthusiasm of students' to learn independent reading and spelling skills. It generally starts with non-words that have less syllables and less difficult and gradually increase in both syllables and difficulty.

The combined scores of these two subtests helps researchers to administer the reading abilities or disabilities of the participants. The scores in one or both of these subtests helps to diagnose the reading problems.

== Materials required ==
This test (TOWRE 2) is a highly simplified test which means that it does not require a lot of or classified materials. According to the test booklet, it only requires simple materials like pen/pencil, stopwatch and stimulus card (which is already inside the booklet) to start the test. To dissect the result and formulate the outcome, the examiner will be using examiner's manual which has scoring instructions for all the tests. The book reviews claims that TOWRE 2 is used by educators, school psychologists, speech pathologists, teachers, teacher's aid and researchers.

== Uses of TOWRE–2 ==
TOWRE–2 can be categorised as multipurpose test as it has been used in several variety of researches and used by different category of people, such as teachers, educational researchers, physicians, speech pathologists and school psychologists. However, we can observe three main uses of TOWRE–2 which are as follows:

=== Early identification ===
TOWRE–2 is a screening test which is assumed to take less than 5 minutes to be administered and get the results. Thus it is presumed to be the easiest way to test students and learn their ability to recognise the reading fluency and accuracy from the very early age. Researchers believe that morphological awareness, i.e. ability to identify the structures of the words, develop from as early as 4 years old. Thus, researchers have used TOWRE–2 to identify morphological awareness in children, and also other reading abilities like reading comprehensions and passage reading efficiency. Teachers have used this test to help diagnose the children who are not benefitting from the reading instructions they are receiving.

=== Diagnosis of learning disabilities ===
TOWRE–2 has widely been used by researchers and teachers to examine learning disabilities in children from age 6–24 years and especially the children from elementary school. It is also used in place of standard diagnostic test of phonetic non-word reading ability, which is mostly used to diagnose learning disabilities like dyslexia. When older children and accomplished young children are slow in orally reciting texts, the individual is considered to have learning disability and is referred to correct specialists. Physicians use TOWRE–2 and similar other tests such as CTOPP (Comprehensive Test Of Phonological Processing) and Woodcock Reading Mastery Test, in the clinical setting because children do not need to bring their text book and can still have materials for the diagnosis.

=== Researches ===
TOWRE was first published in 1999. However, after its publication it has been used numerous times in researches related to language, education and learning disabilities. Just like its predecessor, TOWRE–2, the second edition of TOWRE which was published in 2012, has been used by researchers, teachers and physicians. TOWRE–2 has mostly been used to measure the correlation between reading fluency and reading comprehension.

== Scaled scores and percentile ==
Age equivalent, grade equivalent, percentile marks and scaled scores are four of the normative scores of TOWRE–2, however, the authors recommend to use percentile marks and scaled scores to interpret test results rather than age and grade equivalent. The two subtests, Sight Word Efficiency (SWE) and Phonemic Decoding Efficiency (PDE), and the TWRE index score have mean of 100 and the standard deviation of 15. TWRE index integrate performances of both subtests, which is the reason why it is the most reliable test score.

== TOWRE–2 in United States ==
The test was first researched and administered in United States by Torgesen, Wagner and Rashotte in 1999. School children from 30 states in 1999 and 13 states including Washington DC in 2012 (the second edition of TOWRE) were administered the test to research the use, challenges and outcome of the test. In the present, TOWRE–2 is widely used in school setting and clinical assessments to test the learning disabilities and oral difficulties in children.

== TOWRE -2 in Australia ==
Even though most of the children have the ability to fluently read and comprehend what is taught in the school, there are significant number of children who have difficulty to read fluently and accurately. Australian Bureau of Statistics found that there are 52% of children from age 6–19 years who have difficulty achieving a score that is deemed average for everyday work literacy. Researchers have used TOWRE–2 in Australia to test the level of competency in children concerning reading accuracy and comprehension, and also to test the reason behind polarised achievement in children in the context of reading abilities. According to PISA 2000 (Program for International Student Assessment; OECD, 2002), in Australia, there are more than 40% of children who are strong readers and more than 30% of children who are weak readers.

== Tests similar to TOWRE 2 ==
TOWRE 2 uses phonological non-words and simple to difficult syllabus words in order to detect any learning disabilities or just to find out how much the learning materials provided in the classroom are being effective. It has been known to be used by teachers and health professionals in different sectors. However, there are other tests which are similar to TOWRE 2 and has been used to assess the reading fluency and accuracy in children from age 6–24 years. Some of which are:

=== Comprehensive Test Of Phonological Processing Second Edition (CTOPP - 2) ===
CTOPP - 2 is a test which is administered to children as young as 5 years old to children at the age of 24 years. This test uses phonological words to assess the phonological ability of children and how well they are doing in comparison to their peers. This test consists of phonological awareness, phonological memory and rapid reading.

=== Gray Oral Reading Test Fourth Edition (GORT - 4) ===
There are a lot of reading test related to children, however, there are only few which administer the reading fluency and accuracy of adults. Thus GORT - 4 is a test which is used to assess the reading abilities of adults who have reading difficulty or learning disabilities. This test has two form; Form A and Form B, which compromises of passages. The examiner is required to administer the result by assessing how well the participant reads the passage.

=== Woodcock Johnson Third Edition (WJIII) ===
WJIII is mostly used to administer cognitive abilities, reading achievements and oral language use in both children and adults. This test has three subtests which are Form A (Letter Word Identification), Form B (Passage Comprehension) and Form C (Word Attack). These three subtests can be either jointly used or used separately.

=== The Slosson Phonics and Structural Analysis Test (SP-SAT) ===
SP-SAT is mostly used to assess structural writing skill and phonetic awareness in children from age 6 to 9 years. This test has 100 items which is used to analyse the results in 10–15 minutes. Even though this test is easy to use and takes minimum time, it can only be administered by teachers and educators after specialised training.
