= Reading Recovery =

Early literacy intervention

Reading Recovery is a controversial short-term intervention approach designed for English-speaking children aged five or six, who are the lowest achieving in literacy after their first year of school. For instance, a child who is unable to read the simplest of books or write their own name, after a year in school, would be appropriate for a referral to a Reading Recovery program. The intervention involves intensive one-to-one lessons for 30 minutes a day with a teacher trained in the Reading Recovery method, for between 12 and 20 weeks.

Reading Recovery was developed in the 1970s by New Zealand educator Marie Clay. After lengthy observations of early readers, Clay defined reading as a message-getting, problem-solving activity, and writing as a message-sending, problem-solving activity. Clay suggested that both activities involved linking invisible patterns of oral language with visible symbols. The approach has come under increasing scrutiny in the 21st century.

== Reading Recovery use and practice ==
"Reading Recovery" is in use in a number of English-speaking countries. The phrase "Reading Recovery" is a proprietary registered trademark held by the Marie Clay Trust in New Zealand, with Ohio State University in the US and the Institute of Education in the UK. The Marie Clay Trust and the International Reading Recovery Trainers Organization (IRRTO) licenses use of the title Reading Recovery to affiliated entities around the world.

=== Australia ===
In 2015, a report from the New South Wales Department of Education, concluded that Reading Recovery was largely ineffective, and should not be used for most children. As a result, in 2016, Reading Recovery lost its "mandated status" as part of the curriculum in NSW's more than 900 public schools, although individual schools may still opt to use it. A further consequence of this shift in policy is that, in 2017, the NSW Department of Education initiated a hiring program to recruit dozens of new literacy and numeracy experts to support teachers in "evidence-based professional learning", according to NSW Minister for Education, Rob Stokes.

=== New Zealand ===
After Reading Recovery was removed from the curriculum in many Australian schools, its utility has been questioned by researchers and policy makers in New Zealand as well. By 2019, this had led to reduction in use of Reading Recovery in New Zealand's public schools, and toward a greater emphasis on phonics-based instruction. Parent activism has also contributed to a rise in phonics based instruction and a concomitant decrease in three cueing system (meaning, structural, and visual cueing) based instruction in New Zealand schools.

In May 2024, New Zealand education minister Erica Stanford announced that the Sixth National Government of New Zealand would withdraw funding from Reading Recovery with effect from 2025 and divert funds to "structured literacy" approaches. Stanford stated that "Reading Recovery has had tens of millions in taxpayer funding for years and ignored the evidence about the science of how the overwhelming majority of children best learn to read".

=== North America ===
The Reading Recovery Council of North America, Inc. (RRCNA) is a not-for-profit association of Reading Recovery professionals, advocates, and partners. It is an advocate for Reading Recovery throughout North America (United States and Canada). It publishes two journals for this purpose: The Journal of Reading Recovery and Literacy Teaching and Learning.

Reading Recovery and philosophically similar programs are still used in the United States, but there has been significant push back against the approach. Several large school districts have rejected the approach in favor of phonics based instruction. These include Columbus, Ohio, and Bethlehem, Pennsylvania. Following legislation passed by the Ohio General Assembly in 2023 which banned the use of three-cueing in public schools' core curriculum, the RRCNA filed a lawsuit alleging the ban on three-cueing in favor of phonics was unconstitutional.

== Long Term study of Reading Recovery ==
Reading Recovery has twice been confirmed as an effective intervention by The What Works Clearinghouse (WWC), an investment of the Institute of Education Sciences (IES) within the U.S. Department of Education. Its 2023 review, which doubled down on the findings of its 2013 review, found additional positive effects for students of the early literacy intervention. Among the data in the 2023 report, an IES release cited, “…moderate evidence that Reading Recovery® positively impacted student achievement in literacy immediately after the intervention. There is also promising evidence that the program positively impacted writing productivity and receptive communication immediately after the intervention and writing conventions 3 years after the intervention.”

On April 23, 2022, the Center for Research in Education and Social Policy at the University of Delaware presented the results of a study of the long-term effects of Reading Recovery. The conclusion was that the "long-term impact estimates were significant and negative". The study found that children who received Reading Recovery had scores on state reading tests in third and fourth grade that were below the test scores of similar children who did not receive Reading Recovery. It suggests three possible hypotheses for this outcome:

1. While Reading Recovery produces large impacts on early literacy measures, it does not give students the required skills for success in later grades; or,
2. The gains are lost because students do not receive sufficient intervention in later grades; or,
3. The impacts of the early intervention was washed out by subsequent experiences.

Significant limitations of this study were a 75% attrition rate and design flaws with the control group, which the What Works Clearinghouse stated "not eligible for review as regression discontinuity designs" in its 10-year review and confirmation of Reading Recovery's effectiveness.

Conversely, the 10-year follow-up study found that Reading Recovery has significant long-term impacts on academic performance at age 16. Key findings of the study include: 1. Long-term positive gain to GCSE scores 2. Reduction in the attainment gap 3. Reduced need for special support and a cost benefit. A significant limitation of the study was that the comparison group was significantly more economically disadvantaged than the Reading Recovery group.

== See also ==
- List of phonics programs
- Phonics
- Reading
- Synthetic phonics
- Systematic phonics
- Structured literacy
- Whole language
- Why Johnny Can't Read
