= Phonics =

Method of teaching reading and writing

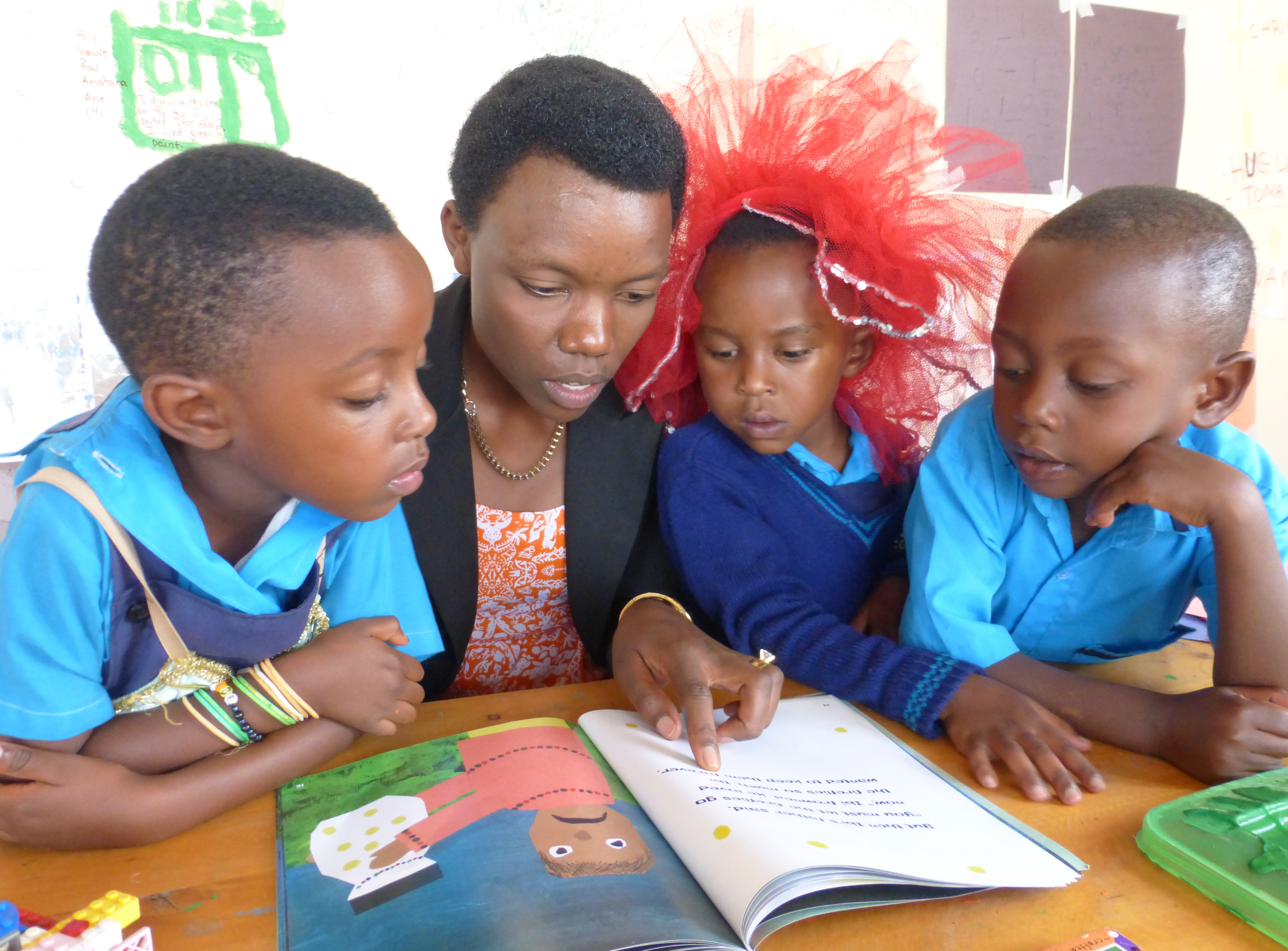
Students learning phonics through a textbook.

Phonics is a method for teaching reading and writing to beginners. To use phonics is to teach the relationship between the sounds of the spoken language (phonemes), and the letters (graphemes) or groups of letters or syllables of the written language. Phonics is also known as the alphabetic principle or the alphabetic code. It can be used with any writing system that is alphabetic, such as that of English, Russian, and most other languages. Phonics is also sometimes used as part of the process of teaching people from China (and other foreign students) to read and write Chinese characters, which are not alphabetic, using pinyin, which is alphabetic.

While the principles of phonics generally apply regardless of the language or region, the examples in this article are from General American English pronunciation. For more about phonics as it applies to British English, see Synthetic phonics, a method by which the student learns the sounds represented by letters and letter combinations, and blends these sounds to pronounce words.

Phonics is taught using a variety of approaches:

- learning individual sounds and their corresponding letters (e.g., the word cat has three letters and three sounds c - a - t, (in IPA: /k/, /æ/, /t/), whereas the word shape has five letters but three sounds: sh - a - p (in IPA: /ʃ/, /eɪ/, /p/)
- learning the sounds of letters or groups of letters, at the word level, such as similar sounds (e.g., cat, can, call), syllables (e.g., pen-cil and al-pha-bet), rhymes, i.e., rhyming syllables (e.g., hat, mat and sat), or consonant blends (also consonant clusters in linguistics, e.g., bl as in black and st as in last)
- having students read books, play games and perform activities that contain the sounds they are learning

== Overview ==
Reading by using phonics is often referred to as decoding words, sounding-out words or using print-to-sound relationships. Since phonics focuses on the sounds and letters within words (i.e. sublexical), it is often contrasted with whole language (a word-level-up philosophy for teaching reading) and a compromise approach called balanced literacy (the attempt to combine whole language and phonics).

Some phonics critics suggest that learning phonics prevents children from reading "real books". However, the Department for Education in England says children should practise phonics by reading books consistent with their developing phonic knowledge and skill; and, at the same time they should hear, share and discuss "a wide range of high-quality books to develop a love of reading and broaden their vocabulary". In addition, researchers say that "the phonological pathway is an essential component of skilled reading" and "for most children it requires instruction, hence phonics". Some recommend 20–30 minutes of daily phonics instruction in grades K–2, about 200 hours.

The National Reading Panel in the United States concluded that systematic phonics instruction is more effective than unsystematic phonics or non-phonics instruction. Some critics suggest that systematic phonics is "skill and drill" with little attention to meaning. However, researchers point out that this impression is false. Teachers can use engaging games or materials to teach letter-sound connections, and it can also be incorporated with the reading of meaningful text.

=== History ===
The term phonics during the 19th century and into the 1970s was used as a synonym of phonetics. The use of the term in reference to the method of teaching is dated to 1901 by the Oxford English Dictionary. The relationship between sounds and letters is the backbone of traditional phonics.

This principle was first presented by John Hart in 1570. Prior to that, children learned to read through the ABC method, by which they recited the letters used in each word, from a familiar piece of text such as Genesis. It was John Hart who first suggested that the focus should be on the relationship between what is now referred to as graphemes and phonemes.

For more information see Practices by country or region (below); and History of learning to read.

=== Phonemic awareness ===
Not to be confused with phonics, phonemic awareness (PA) is the ability to hear, identify, and manipulate the individual spoken sounds of language, independent of writing. Phonemic awareness is part of oral language ability and is critical for learning to read. To assess phonemic awareness, or teach it explicitly, learners are given a variety of exercises, such as adding a sound (e.g., Add the th sound to the beginning of the word ink), changing a sound (e.g., In the word sing, change the ng sound to the t sound), or removing a sound (e.g., In the word park, remove the p sound). Phonemic awareness and the resulting knowledge of spoken language is the most important determinant of a child's early reading success. Phonemic awareness is sometimes taught separately from phonics and at other times it is the result of phonics instruction (i.e. segmenting or blending phonemes with letters). It is that part of phonological awareness that is concerned with phonemes.

In one instance, a 2014 program of advanced phonemic awareness training (without using the corresponding letters) improved the PA but not the word reading. When teaching phonemic awareness, the National Reading Panel found that better results were obtained with focused and explicit instruction of one or two elements, over five or more hours, in small groups, and using the corresponding graphemes (letters).

=== The alphabetic principle/code ===
English spelling is based on the alphabetic principle. In the education field it is also referred to as the alphabetic code. In an alphabetic writing system, letters are used to represent speech sounds, or phonemes. For example, the word cat is spelled with three letters, c, a, and t, each representing a phoneme, respectively, /k/, /æ/, and /t/.

The spelling structures for some alphabetic languages, such as Spanish, Russian and German, are comparatively orthographically transparent, or orthographically shallow, because there is nearly a one-to-one correspondence between sounds and the letter patterns that represent them. English spelling is more complex, a deep orthography, partly because it attempts to represent the 40+ phonemes of the spoken language with an alphabet composed of only 26 letters (and no accent marks or diacritics). As a result, two letters are often used together to represent distinct sounds, referred to as digraphs. For example, t and h placed side by side to represent either /θ/ as in math or /ð/ as in father.

English has absorbed many words from other languages throughout its history, usually without changing the spelling of those words. As a result, the written form of English includes the spelling patterns of many languages (Old English, Old Norse, Norman French, Classical Latin and Greek, as well as numerous modern languages) superimposed upon one another. These overlapping spelling patterns mean that in many cases the same sound can be spelled differently (e.g., tray and break) and the same spelling can represent different sounds (e.g., moon and book). However, the spelling patterns usually follow certain conventions. In addition, the Great Vowel Shift, a historical linguistic process in which the quality of many vowels in English changed while the spelling remained as it was, greatly diminished the transparency of English spelling in relation to pronunciation.

The result is that English spelling patterns vary considerably in the degree to which they follow rules. For example, the letters ee almost always represent /iː/ (e.g., meet), but the sound can also be represented by the letters e, i and y and digraphs ie, ei, or ea (e.g., she, sardine, sunny, chief, seize, eat). Similarly, the letter cluster ough represents /ʌf/ as in enough, /oʊ/ as in though, /uː/ as in through, /ɒf/ as in cough, /aʊ/ as in bough, /ɔː/ as in bought, and /ʌp/ as in hiccough, while in slough and lough, the pronunciation varies.

Although the patterns are inconsistent, when English spelling rules take into account syllable structure, phonetics, etymology, and accents, there are dozens of rules that are 75% or more reliable. This level of reliability can only be achieved by extending the rules far outside the domain of phonics, which deals with letter-sound correspondences, and into the morphophonemic and morphological domains.

== Alternative spellings of the sounds ==
The following are a selection of the alternative spellings of the 40+ sounds of the English language based on General American English pronunciation, recognizing there are many regional variations. Teachers of synthetic phonics emphasize the letter sounds instead of the letter names (i.e. "mmm" not "em", "sss" not "ess", "fff" not "ef"). It is usually recommended that teachers of English-reading introduce the "most frequent sounds" and the "common spellings" first and save the more infrequent sounds and complex spellings for later. (e.g., the sounds /s/ and /t/ before /v/ and /w/; and the spellings cake before eight and cat before duck).

For a more complete list of alternative spellings of the sounds, see English orthography § Sound-to-spelling correspondences.

Short vowels:
a - mat, plaid, have, half, laugh
e - bed, many, head, said, friend, guest
i - fish, gym, busy, pretty, lynch, give
o - on, father, saw, faucet, chalk, caught
u - up, onion, touch, love, does, blood
oo - look, push, should, wolf,

Long vowels:
a - cake, play, maid, break, eight, veil
e - bee, eat, funny, she, scene, key
i - bike, find, night, my, tie, island
o - pony, rope, bow, boat, toe, dough
u - cube, uniform, few, hue, feud, beauty
oo - room, flu, suit, soup, groove, two
ow - house, clown, plough
oy - toy, oil, noise, gargoyle, turquoise

R-controlled vowels:
air - chair, care, very, wary, carry, pear, where
ar - art, heart, guardian, bazaar, are, sergeant
ear - fear, steer, here
er - butter, word, bird, color, turkey, earth
or - sort, roar, floor, core, four, quart
ure - cure, tourist

Simple consonants:
b - ball, rabbit
c/k - camera, kitten, school, truck, occur, antique
d - drive, rained, ladder
f - first, photograph, stiff, laugh, calf, sapphire
g - girl, egg, ghost, league, guard
h - home, who
j - jam, page, gym, fridge, soldier, adjust, region
l - light, bell, people
m - man, welcome, hammer, crumb, palm, column, phlegm
n - new, sunny, know, gnat, pneumatic, mnemonic, handsome
p - piano, puppy
r - river, sorrow, wrist, colonel, corps, mortgage, rhythm
s - smile, grass, sauce, mouse, city, scene
t - travel, butter, slipped, debt, yacht, receipt
v - van, glove
w - wall, white
y - yellow, onion
z - zoo, fries, cheese, breeze, puzzle, scissors

Complex consonants and digraphs:

ch - chair, watch, cello, righteous, question, structure
k+s^{1} - box, books, ducks, lakes
k+w^{1} - queen
-ul - table, animal, camel
ng - spring
sh - show, lotion, sure, chef, mission, ocean, special,
th - think
th - them
g+z^{1} - exam, exist
z-h - vision, treasure, azure, equation, garage, regime

^{1} Clearly, "k+s", "k+w" and "g+z" each have two sounds that are blended together. However, they are often taught in this fashion to make it easier for the learner to understand the sounds of "x" and "qu".

One researcher suggests that students be taught 120 graphemes as follows: the first 30 in kindergarten, the next 60 in grade 1, and the final 30 in grade 2.

== Vowel and consonant phonics patterns ==
The following is an explanation of many of the phonics patterns.

=== Vowel phonics patterns ===
- Short vowels are the five single letter vowels, a, e, i, o, and u, when they produce the sounds /æ/ as in cat, /ɛ/ as in bet, /ɪ/ as in sit, /ɒ/ as in hot, and /ʌ/ as in cup. The term "short vowel" is historical, and meant that at one time (in Middle English) these vowels were pronounced for a particularly short period of time; currently, it means just that they are not diphthongs like the long vowels.
- Long vowels have the same sound as the names of the vowels, such as /eɪ/ in bay, /iː/ in bee, /aɪ/ in mine, /oʊ/ in no, and /juː/ in use. The way that educators use the term "long vowels" differs from the way in which linguists use this term. Careful educators use the term "long vowel letters" or "long vowels", not "long vowel sounds", since four of the five long vowels (long vowel letters) in fact represent combinations of sounds (a, i, o, and u, that is /eɪ/ in bay, /aɪ/ in mine, /oʊ/ in no, and /juː/ in use) and only one consists of a single vowel sound that is long (/iː/ in bee), which is how linguists use the term. In classrooms, long vowels are taught as having "the same sounds as the names of the letters". Teachers teach the children that a long vowel "says its name".
- Schwa is the third sound that most of the single vowel spellings can represent. It is the indistinct sound of many a vowel in an unstressed syllable, and is represented by the linguistic symbol /ə/; it is the sound of the o in lesson, of the a in sofa. Although it is the most common vowel sound in spoken English, schwa is not always taught to elementary school students because some find it difficult to understand. However, some educators make the argument that schwa should be included in primary reading programs because of its vital importance in the correct pronunciation of English words.
- Closed syllables are syllables in which a single vowel letter is followed by a consonant. In the word button, both syllables are closed syllables (but^{.}ton) because they contain single vowels followed by consonants. Therefore, the letter u represents the short sound /ʌ/. (The o in the second syllable makes the /ə/ sound because it is an unstressed syllable.)
- Open syllables are syllables in which a vowel appears at the end of the syllable. The vowel will say its long sound. In the word basin, ba is an open syllable and therefore says /beɪ/.
- Diphthongs are linguistic elements that fuse two adjacent vowel sounds. English has four common diphthongs. The commonly recognized diphthongs are /aʊ/ as in cow and /ɔɪ/ as in boil. Three of the long vowels are also in fact combinations of two vowel sounds, in other words diphthongs: /aɪ/ as in "I" or mine, /oʊ/ as in no, and /eɪ/ as in bay, which partly accounts for the reason they are considered "long".
- Vowel digraphs are those spelling patterns wherein two letters are used to represent a vowel sound. The ai in sail is a vowel digraph. Because the first letter in a vowel digraph sometimes says its long vowel sound, as in sail, some phonics programs once taught that "when two vowels go walking, the first one does the talking." This convention has been almost universally discarded owing to the many non-examples, such as the au spelling of the /ɔː/ sound and the oo spelling of the /uː/ and /ʊ/ sounds, neither of which follow this pattern.
- Vowel-consonant-E spellings are those wherein a single vowel letter, followed by a consonant and the letter e makes the long vowel sound. The tendency is often referred to as "the silent E" or "the magic E" with examples such as bake, theme, hike, cone, and cute. (The ee spelling, as in meet is sometimes, but inconsistently, considered part of this pattern.)
- R-controlled syllables include those wherein a vowel followed by an r has a different sound from its regular pattern. For example, a word like car should have the pattern of a "closed syllable" because it has one vowel and ends in a consonant. However, the a in car does not have its regular "short" sound (/æ/ as in cat) because it is controlled by the r. The r changes the sound of the vowel that precedes it. Other examples include: park, horn, her, bird, and burn.
- The Consonant-le syllable is a final syllable, located at the end of the base/root word. It contains a consonant, followed by the letters le. The e is silent and is present because it was pronounced in earlier English and the spelling is historical. Examples are: candle, stable and apple.

=== Consonant phonics patterns ===
- Consonant digraphs are those spellings wherein two letters are used to represent a single consonant phoneme. The most common consonant digraphs are ch for /tʃ/, ng for /ŋ/, ph for /f/, sh for /ʃ/, th for /θ/ and /ð/. Letter combinations like wr for /r/ and kn for /n/ are technically also consonant digraphs, although they are so rare that they are sometimes considered patterns with "silent letters".
- Short vowel+consonant patterns involve the spelling of the sounds /k/ as in peek, /dʒ/ as in stage, and /tʃ/ as in speech. These sounds each have two possible spellings at the end of a word, ck and k for /k/, dge and ge for /dʒ/, and tch and ch for /tʃ/. The spelling is determined by the type of vowel that precedes the sound. If a short vowel precedes the sound, the former spelling is used, as in pick, judge, and match. If a short vowel does not precede the sound, the latter spelling is used, as in took, barge, and launch.

These patterns are just a few examples out of dozens that can be used to help learners unpack the challenging English alphabetic code. While complex, many believe English spelling does retain order and reason.

== Effectiveness of programs and evidence-based education ==
Researchers such as Joseph Torgesen estimate that "between four and six percent" of children would still have weak word reading skills even if they were exposed to effective interventions in the first or second year of school. Yet, in the USA 20% or more do not meet grade expectations.

According to the 2019 Nation's Report card, 34% of grade four students in the United States failed to perform at or above the Basic reading level. There was a significant difference by race and ethnicity (e.g., black students at 52% and white students at 23%). Following the impact of the COVID-19 pandemic, this increased to 37% in 2022, and by 2024 it was at 40%. It is believed that students who read below the basic level lack sufficient support to complete their schoolwork.

Between 2013 and October 2025, 40 US states and the District of Columbia had passed laws or implemented new policies related to evidence-based reading instruction. As a result, many schools are moving away from balanced literacy programs that encourage students to guess a word, and are introducing phonics where they learn to "decode" (sound out) words.

The Canadian provinces of Ontario and Nova Scotia, respectively, reported that 26% and 30% of grade three students did not meet the provincial reading standards in 2019. In Ontario, 53% of Grade 3 students with special education needs (students who have an Individual Education Plan), were not meeting the provincial standard. In 2022, the Minister of Education for Ontario said they are taking immediate action to improve student literacy and making longer-term reforms to modernize the way reading is taught and assessed in schools, with a focus on phonics. Their plan includes "revising the elementary Language curriculum and the Grade 9 English course with scientific, evidence-based approaches that emphasize direct, explicit and systematic instruction, and removing references to unscientific discovery and inquiry-based learning, including the three-cueing system, by 2023."

Proponents of evidence-based reading instruction maintain that teaching reading without teaching phonics can be harmful to large numbers of students, although in their view not all phonics teaching programs are equally effective. According to them, the effectiveness of a program depends on using specific curriculum and instruction techniques, classroom management, grouping, and other factors. Phonics instruction is also an important part of the science of reading.

Interest in evidence-based education appears to be growing. In 2019, Best Evidence Encyclopedia (BEE) released a review of research on 48 different programs for struggling readers in elementary schools. Many of the programs used phonics-based teaching and/or one or more of the following: cooperative learning, technology-supported adaptive instruction (see Educational technology), metacognitive skills, phonemic awareness, word reading, fluency, vocabulary, multisensory learning, spelling, guided reading, reading comprehension, word analysis, structured curriculum, and balanced literacy (non-phonetic approach).

The BEE review concludes that:

1. Outcomes were positive for one-to-one tutoring.
2. Outcomes were positive but not as large for one-to-small group tutoring.
3. There were no differences in outcomes between teachers and teaching assistants as tutors.
4. Technology-supported adaptive instruction did not have positive outcomes.
5. Whole-class approaches (mostly cooperative learning) and whole-school approaches incorporating tutoring obtained outcomes for struggling readers as large as those found for one-to-one tutoring, and benefitted many more students.
6. Approaches mixing classroom and school improvements, with tutoring for the most at-risk students, have the greatest potential for the largest numbers of struggling readers.

Robert Slavin, of BEE, goes so far as to suggest that states should "hire thousands of tutors" to support students scoring far below grade level – particularly in elementary school reading. Research, he says, shows "only tutoring, both one-to-one and one-to-small group, in reading and mathematics, had an effect size larger than +0.10 ... averages are around +0.30", and "well-trained teaching assistants using structured tutoring materials or software can obtain outcomes as good as those obtained by certified teachers as tutors".

Other evidence-based comparison databases featuring phonics and other methods include Evidence for ESSA (Center for Research and Reform in Education) (meeting the standards of the U.S. Every Student Succeeds Act, and the What Works Clearinghouse.

== Teaching reading with phonics ==
A Course of Study in Phonics, San Francisco, US, 1912

Teacher's manual to accompany Easy road to reading, Chicago and New York, US, 1914

=== Combining phonics with other literacy instruction ===
There are many ways that phonics is taught and it is often taught together with some of the following: oral language skills, concepts about print, phonological awareness, phonemic awareness, phonology, oral fluency, vocabulary, syllables, reading comprehension, spelling, word study, cooperative learning, multisensory learning, and guided reading. And, phonics is often featured in discussions about science of reading, and evidence-based practices.

The National Reading Panel (U.S. 2000) suggests that phonics be taught together with phonemic awareness, oral fluency, vocabulary and comprehension. Timothy Shanahan, a member of that panel, suggests that primary students receive 60–90 minutes per day of explicit, systematic, literacy instruction time; and that it be divided equally between a) words and word parts (e.g., letters, sounds, decoding and phonemic awareness), b) oral reading fluency, c) reading comprehension, and d) writing. Furthermore, he states that "the phonemic awareness skills found to give the greatest reading advantage to kindergarten and first-grade children are segmenting and blending".

The Ontario Association of Deans of Education (Canada) published research Monograph # 37 titled Supporting early language and literacy with suggestions for parents and teachers in helping children prior to grade one. It covers the areas of letter names and letter-sound correspondence (phonics), as well as conversation, play-based learning, print, phonological awareness, shared reading, and vocabulary.

=== Sight words and sight vocabulary ===
Sight words (i.e. high-frequency or common words) are not a part of the phonics method. They are usually associated with whole language and balanced literacy where students are expected to memorize common words such as those on the Dolch word list and the Fry word list (e.g., a, be, call, do, eat, fall, gave, etc.). The supposition (in whole language) is that students will learn to read more easily if they memorize the most common words they will encounter, especially words that are not easily decoded (i.e. exceptions). However, according to research, whole-word memorisation is "labor-intensive", requiring on average about 35 trials per word.

On the other hand, phonics advocates say that most words are decodable, so comparatively few words have to be memorized. And because a child will over time encounter many low-frequency words, "the phonological recoding mechanism is a very powerful, indeed essential, mechanism throughout reading development". Furthermore, researchers suggest that teachers who withhold phonics instruction to make it easier on children "are having the opposite effect" by making it harder for children to gain basic word-recognition skills. They suggest that learners should focus on understanding the principles of phonics so they can recognize the phonemic overlaps among words (e.g., have, had, has, having, haven't, etc.), making it easier to decode them all.

Sight vocabulary is a part of the phonics method. It describes words that are stored in long-term memory and read automatically. Skilled fully-alphabetic readers learn to store words in long-term memory without memorization (i.e. a mental dictionary), making reading and comprehension easier. The process, called orthographic mapping, involves decoding, crosschecking, mental marking and rereading. It takes significantly less time than memorization. This process works for fully-alphabetic readers when reading simple decodable words from left to right through the word. Irregular words pose more of a challenge, yet research in 2018 concluded that "fully-alphabetic students" learn irregular words more easily when they use a process called hierarchical decoding. In this process, students, rather than decode from left to right, are taught to focus attention on the irregular elements such as a vowel-digraph and a silent-e; for example, break (b - r - ea - k), height (h - eigh - t), touch (t - ou - ch), and make (m - a- ke). Consequentially, they suggest that teachers and tutors should focus on "teaching decoding with more advanced vowel patterns before expecting young readers to tackle irregular words".

=== Systematic phonics ===
Systematic phonics is not one specific method of teaching phonics; it is a term used to describe phonics approaches that are taught explicitly and in a structured, systematic manner. They are systematic because the letters and the sounds they relate to are taught in a specific sequence, as opposed to incidentally or on a "when needed" basis.

Systematic phonics is sometimes mischaracterized as "skill and drill" with little attention to meaning. However, researchers point out that this impression is false. Teachers can use engaging games or materials to teach letter-sound connections, and it can also be incorporated with the reading of meaningful text.

Phonics can be taught systematically in a variety of ways, such as: synthetic phonics, analytic phonics, analogy phonics, and phonics through spelling. However, their effectiveness vary considerably because the methods differ in such areas as the range of letter-sound coverage, the structure of the lesson plans, and the time devoted to specific instructions.

Systematic phonics has gained increased acceptance in different parts of the world since the completion of four major studies into teaching reading; one in the United States in 2000, another in Australia in 2005, one in the UK in 2006., and another in Canada in 2022.

In 2009, the UK Department of Education published a curriculum review that added support for systematic phonics, which in the UK is known as synthetic phonics. Beginning as early as 2014, several States in the United States have changed their curriculum to include systematic phonics instruction in elementary school. In 2018, the State Government of Victoria, Australia, published a website containing a comprehensive Literacy Teaching Toolkit including Effective Reading Instruction, Phonics, and Sample Phonics Lessons.

=== Synthetic phonics ===
Synthetic phonics, also known as blended phonics, is a method employed to teach students to read by sounding out the letters then blending the sounds to form the word. This method involves learning how letters or letter groups represent individual sounds, and that those sounds are blended to form a word. For example, shrouds would be read by pronouncing the sounds for each spelling, sh,r,ou,d,s (IPA /ʃ, r, aʊ, d, z/), then blending those sounds orally to produce a spoken word, sh - r - ou - d - s = shrouds (IPA /ʃraʊdz/). The goal of either a blended phonics or synthetic phonics instructional program is that students identify the sound-symbol correspondences and blend their phonemes automatically. Since 2005, synthetic phonics has become the accepted method of teaching reading (by phonics instruction) in the United Kingdom and Australia. In the United States, a pilot program using the Core Knowledge Early Literacy program that used this type of phonics approach showed significantly higher results in K–3 reading compared with comparison schools. In addition, several States such as California, Ohio, New York and Arkansas, are promoting the principles of synthetic phonics (see synthetic phonics in the US).

=== Analytic phonics and analogy phonics ===
Analytic phonics does not involve pronouncing individual sounds (phonemes) in isolation and blending the sounds, as is done in synthetic phonics. Rather, it is taught at the word level and students learn to analyze letter-sound relationships once the word is identified. For example, students analyze letter-sound correspondences such as the ou spelling of /aʊ/ in shriouds. Also, students might be asked to practice saying words with similar sounds such as ball, bat and bite. Furthermore, students are taught consonant blends (separate, adjacent consonants) as units, such as break or shrouds.

Analogy phonics is a particular type of analytic phonics in which the teacher has students analyze phonic elements according to the speech sounds (phonograms) in the word. One method is referred to as the onset-rime) approach. The onset is the initial sound and the rime is the vowel and the consonant sounds that follow it. For example, in the words cat, mat and sat, the rime is at.) Teachers using the analogy method may have students memorize a bank of phonograms, such as -at or -am.

Teachers might also teach students about word families (e.g., can, ran, man, or may, play, say). When students are exposed to different word families, they are able to identify, analyze and construct different rhyming word patterns. An example of a student's increasing ability to construct a rhyming word pattern with the oa grapheme would be as follows: road, toad, load and goad. Examples of other recognizable graphemes that allow students to construct rhyming word patterns are at, igh, ew, oo, ou and air. More letter combinations or graphemes can be viewed in the table below to support students increasing ability to construct a rhyming word pattern of similar phonemes or speech sound:

Graphemes
Consonant Diagraphs	Short Vowel Sounds	Long Vowel Sounds	Vowel Diphthongs
ng	ea	ai	ou_e
tch	ough	e_e	oy
	aw	ea	

Letter combinations or graphemes of new words should have letters students have already learned and can recognize on their own.

There have been many experimental research studies and correlational data studies conducted on the effectiveness of instruction using analytic phonics and synthetic phonics. Johnston et al. (2012) conducted experimental research studies that tested the effectiveness of phonics learning instruction among 10 year old boys and girls. They used comparative data from the Clackmannanshire Report and chose 393 participants to compare synthetic phonics instruction and analytic phonics instruction. The boys taught by the synthetic phonics method had better word reading than the girls in their classes, and their spelling and reading comprehension was as good. On the other hand, with analytic phonics teaching, although the boys performed as well as the girls in word reading, they had inferior spelling and reading comprehension. Overall, the group taught by synthetic phonics had better word reading, spelling, and reading comprehension. And, synthetic phonics did not lead to any impairment in the reading of irregular words.

=== Structured literacy ===
Structured literacy is a way of teaching reading using methods that are systematic, cumulative, explicit, multi-sensory, and diagnostic. It teaches phonology, phonics (sound-symbol association), syllables, morphology, syntax, and semantics.

=== Embedded phonics with mini-lessons ===
Embedded phonics, also known as Incidental phonics, is the type of phonics instruction used in whole language programs. It is not systematic phonics. Although phonics skills are de-emphasised in whole language programs, some teachers include phonics "mini-lessons" when students struggle with words while reading from a book. Short lessons are included based on phonics elements the students are having trouble with, or on a new or difficult phonics pattern that appears in a class reading assignment. The focus on meaning is generally maintained, but the mini-lesson provides some time for focus on individual sounds and the letters that represent them. Embedded phonics is different from other methods because instruction is always in the context of literature rather than in separate lessons about distinct sounds and letters; and skills are taught when an opportunity arises, not systematically.

=== Phonics through spelling ===
For some teachers this is a method of teaching spelling by using the sounds (phonemes). However, it can also be a method of teaching reading by focusing on the sounds and their spelling (i.e. phonemes and syllables). It is taught systematically with guided lessons conducted in a direct and explicit manner including appropriate feedback. Sometimes mnemonic cards containing individual sounds are used to allow the student to practice saying the sounds that are related to a letter or letters (e.g., a, e, i, o, u). Accuracy comes first, followed by speed. The sounds may be grouped by categories such as vowels that sound short (e.g., c-a-t and s-i-t). When the student is comfortable recognizing and saying the sounds, the following steps might be followed: a) the tutor says a target word and the student repeats it out loud, b) the student writes down each individual sound (letter) until the word is completely spelled, saying each sound as it is written, and c) the student says the entire word out loud. An alternate method would be to have the student use mnemonic cards to sound-out (spell) the target word.

Typically, the instruction starts with sounds that have only one letter and simple CVC words such as sat and pin. Then it progresses to longer words, and sounds with more than one letter (e.g., hear and day), and perhaps even syllables (e.g., wa-ter). Sometimes the student practices saying (or sounding-out) cards that contain entire words.

=== Reading and spelling (writing) ===
Evidence supports the strong synergy between reading (decoding) and spelling (encoding), especially for children in kindergarten or grade one and elementary school students at risk for literacy difficulties. Students receiving encoding instruction and guided practice that included using (a) manipulatives such as letter tiles to learn phoneme-grapheme relationships and words and (b) writing phoneme-grapheme relationships and words made from these correspondences significantly outperformed contrast groups not receiving encoding instruction.

=== Using embedded pictures, and mnemonic alphabet cards when teaching phonics ===
Research supports the use of embedded, picture mnemonic (memory support) alphabet cards when teaching letters and sounds, but not words.

=== Introducing the Letters - Faster vs. slower ===
A study in 2019 concluded that, during the first year of school, introducing the letters at a faster pace yielded significantly better results, especially for the lower-performing students.

== The Reading Wars – phonics vs. whole language ==
A debate has been going on for decades about the merits of phonics vs. whole language, often known in the UK as "look and say". It is sometimes referred to as the Reading Wars.

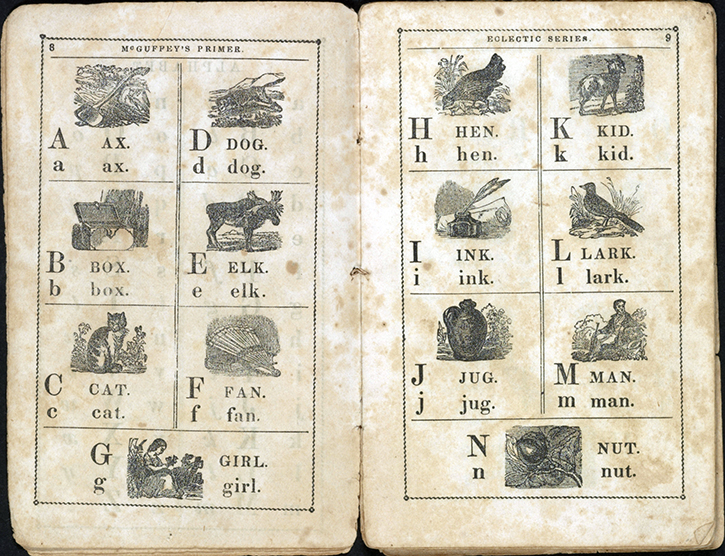
McGuffey's Primer 1836

Phonics was a popular way to learn reading in the 19th century. William Holmes McGuffey (1800–1873), an American educator, author, and Presbyterian minister who had a lifelong interest in teaching children, compiled the first four of the McGuffey Readers in 1836.

Then, in 1841 Horace Mann, the Secretary of the Massachusetts Board of Education, advocated for a whole-word method of teaching reading to replace phonics. Rudolf Flesch advocated for a return to phonics in his book Why Johnny Can't Read (1955).

The whole-word method received support from Kenneth J. Goodman who wrote an article in 1967 titled Reading: A psycholinguistic guessing game. In it, he says efficient reading is the result of the "skill in selecting the fewest, most productive cues necessary to produce guesses which are right the first time". Although not supported by scientific studies, the theory became very influential as the whole language method. Since the 1970s some whole language supporters such as Frank Smith, are unyielding in arguing that phonics should be taught little, if at all.

Yet other researchers say instruction in phonics and phonemic awareness are "critically important" and "essential" to develop early reading skills. In 2000, the US National Reading Panel identified five ingredients of effective reading instruction, of which phonics is one; the other four are phonemic awareness, fluency, vocabulary and comprehension. Reports from other countries, such as the Australian report on Teaching reading (2005) and the Independent review of the teaching of early reading (Rose Report 2006) from the UK have also supported the use of phonics.

Some notable researchers have clearly stated their disapproval of whole language. Cognitive neuroscientist Stanislas Dehaene has said, "cognitive psychology directly refutes any notion of teaching via a 'global' or 'whole language' method." He goes on to talk about "the myth of whole-word reading" (also: sight words), saying it has been refuted by recent experiments. "We do not recognize a printed word through a holistic grasping of its contours, because our brain breaks it down into letters and graphemes." Mark Seidenberg refers to whole language as a "theoretical zombie" because it persists in spite of a lack of supporting evidence.

Furthermore, a 2017 study published in the Journal of Experimental Psychology compared teaching with phonics vs. teaching whole written words and concluded that phonics is more effective. It states "Our results suggest that early literacy education should focus on the systematicities present in print-to-sound relationships in alphabetic languages, rather than teaching meaning-based strategies, in order to enhance both reading aloud and comprehension of written words".

More recently, some educators have advocated for the theory of balanced literacy purported to combine phonics and whole language yet not necessarily in a consistent or systematic manner. It may include elements such as word study and phonics mini-lessons, differentiated learning, cueing, leveled reading, shared reading, guided reading, independent reading and sight words. According to a survey in 2010, 68% of K–2 teachers in the United States practice balanced literacy; however, only 52% of teachers included phonics in their definition of balanced literacy. In addition, 75% of teachers teach the three-cueing system (i.e., meaning/structure/visual or semantic/syntactic/graphophonic) that has its roots in whole language.

In addition, some phonics supporters assert that balanced literacy is merely whole language by another name. Critics of whole language and skeptics of balanced literacy, such as neuroscientist Mark Seidenberg, state that struggling readers should not be encouraged to skip words that they find puzzling or to rely on semantic and syntactic cues to guess words.

Over time a growing number of countries and states have put greater emphasis on phonics and other evidence-based practices (see Practices by country or region below). This has focused attention on Systematic phonics and Structured literacy.

=== Simple view of reading ===
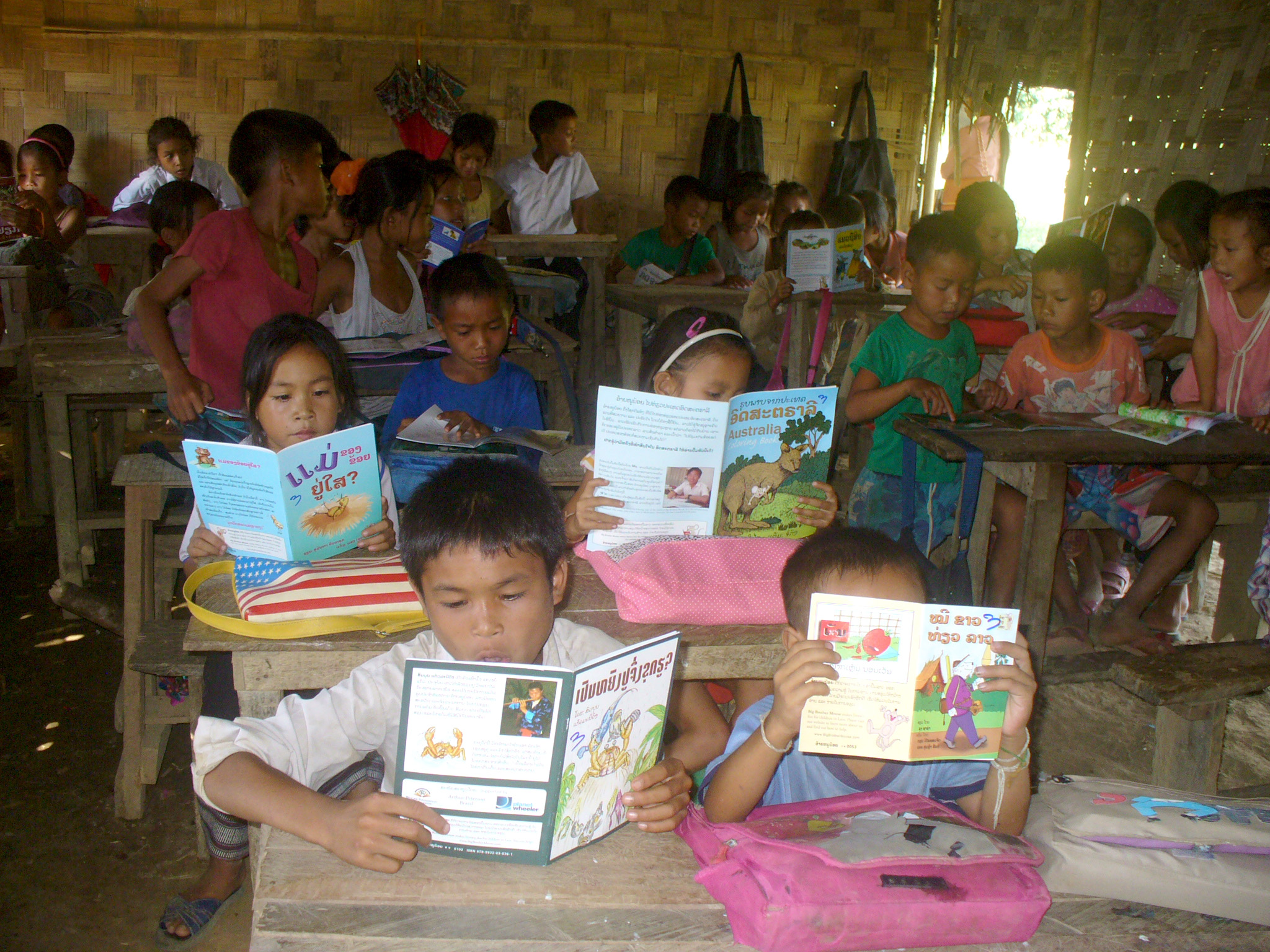
Reading time at a primary school in rural Lao PDR

The simple view of reading is a scientific theory about reading comprehension. The creators of the theory hoped it would help to end the reading wars. According to the theory, in order to comprehend what they are reading students need both decoding skills and oral language comprehension ability; neither is enough on their own.

The formula is: Decoding × Oral Language Comprehension = Reading Comprehension.

Students are not reading if they can decode words but do not understand their meaning. Similarly, students are not reading if they cannot decode words that they would ordinarily recognize and understand if they heard them spoken out loud.

== Practices by country or region ==
The following are examples of how phonics is used in some countries:

=== Australia ===
On November 30, 2004 Brendan Nelson, Minister for Education, Science and Training, established a National Inquiry into the Teaching of Literacy in Australia. The Inquiry examined the way reading is taught in schools, as well as the effectiveness of teacher education courses in preparing teachers for reading instruction. In the resulting report in 2005, Teaching Reading, the first two recommendations make clear the committee's conviction about the need to base the teaching of reading on evidence and the importance of teaching systematic, explicit phonics within an integrated approach.

The executive summary states, "The evidence is clear ... that direct systematic instruction in phonics during the early years of schooling is an essential foundation for teaching children to read. Findings from the research evidence indicate that all students learn best when teachers adopt an integrated approach to reading that explicitly teaches phonemic awareness, phonics, fluency, vocabulary knowledge and comprehension." The Inquiry Committee also states that the apparent dichotomy between phonics and the whole-Language approach to teaching "is false". However, it goes on to say "It was clear, however, that systematic phonics instruction is critical if children are to be taught to read well, whether or not they experience reading difficulties."

In the executive summary it goes on to say the following:

"Overall we conclude that the synthetic phonics approach, as part of the reading curriculum, is more effective than the analytic phonics approach, even when it is supplemented with phonemic awareness training. It also led boys to reading words significantly better than girls, and there was a trend towards better spelling and reading comprehension. There is evidence that synthetic phonics is best taught at the beginning of Primary 1, as even by the end of the second year at school the children in the early synthetic phonics programme had better spelling ability, and the girls had significantly better reading ability."

As of October 5, 2018, The State Government of Victoria, Australia, publishes a website containing a comprehensive Literacy Teaching Toolkit including Effective Reading Instruction, Phonics, and Sample Phonics Lessons. It contains elements of synthetic phonics, analytical phonics, and analogy phonics.

The Department of Education of Queensland published a review titled Effective teaching of reading in 2023. It has a comprehensive section on word reading, including Systematic synthetic phonics.

In 2016 Australia ranked 21st in the PIRLS reading achievement for students in their fourth year of school.

=== Canada ===
In Canada, public education is the responsibility of the Provincial and Territorial governments. As in other countries there has been much debate on the value of phonics in teaching reading in English; however, phonemic awareness and phonics appears to be receiving some attention. The curriculum of all of the Canadian provinces include some of the following: phonics, phonological awareness, segmenting and blending, decoding, phonemic awareness, graphophonic cues, and letter-sound relationships. (Note: Sources:) In addition, systematic phonics and synthetic phonics receive attention in some publications.

However, some of the practices of whole language are evident, such as:

- British Columbia – "consistently using three cueing systems, meaning, structure, and visual" and "using illustrations and prior knowledge to predict meaning",
- Alberta – "using cues such as pictures, context, phonics, grammatical awareness and background knowledge" and "use a variety of strategies, such as making predictions, rereading and reading on",
- Saskatchewan – "using the cueing systems to construct meaning from the text",
- Manitoba – "use syntactic, semantic, and graphophonic cues to construct and confirm meaning in context",
- Ontario – "predict the meaning of and solve unfamiliar words using different types of cues, including: semantic (meaning) cues, syntactic (language structure) cues, and graphophonic (phonological and graphic) cues,
- Quebec – "use of pictures and other graphic representations to interpret texts",
- Nova Scotia – "cueing systems (context, meaning, structure and visual)"; "predict on the basis of what makes sense, what sounds right, and what the print suggests"; "balanced literacy program" and "search for and use meaning and structure and/or visual information (MSV)", and
- Newfoundland and Labrador – "use and integrate, with support, the various cueing systems (pragmatic, semantic, syntactic, and graphophonic).

Consequently, except for those indicated below, there appears to be no evidence of a comprehensive or systematic practice of phonics in most of Canada's public schools.

In 2016, among 50 countries, Canada ranked 23rd in the PIRLS reading achievement for students in their fourth year of school.

In 2018, Canada ranked 6th out of 78 countries in the PISA reading scores for 15-year-old students. However, critics say PISA is fundamentally flawed, and in 2014 more than 100 academics from around the world called for a moratorium on PISA.

In 2021, the province of New Brunswick introduced a new English Language Arts curriculum that includes phonological awareness, phonics, fluency, vocabulary and reading comprehension. Notably, the teaching of alphabetic skills based on the science of reading has replaced the use of various cueing systems and a variety of strategies to construct meaning from text.

On January 27, 2022, the Ontario Human Rights Commission (OHRC) released a report on its public inquiry into the right to read. It followed the unanimous decision of the Supreme Court of Canada, on November 9, 2012, recognizing that learning to read is not a privilege, but a basic and essential human right.

The OHRC's report deals with all students, not just those with learning disabilities. The inquiry found that Ontario is not fulfilling its obligations to meet students' right to read. Specifically, foundational word-reading skills are not effectively targeted in Ontario's education system. With science-based approaches to reading instruction, early screening, and intervention, we should see only about 5% of students reading below grade level. However, in 2018–2019, 26% of all Ontario Grade 3 students and 53% of Grade 3 students with special education needs (students who have an Individual Education Plan), were not meeting the provincial EQAO standard. The results improved only slightly for Grade 6 students, where 19% of all students and 47% of students with special education needs did not meet the provincial standard.

The Ontario curriculum encourages the use of the three-cueing system and balanced literacy, which are ineffective because they teach children to "guess" the meaning of a word rather than sound it out. What is required is a) evidence-based curriculum and instruction (including explicit and systematic instruction in phonemic awareness and phonics), b) evidence-based screening assessments, c) evidence-based reading interventions, d) accommodations that are not used as a substitute for teaching students to read, and e) professional assessments (yet, not required for interventions or accommodations).

The Minister of Education for Ontario responded to this report by saying the government is taking immediate action to improve student literacy and making longer-term reforms to modernize the way reading is taught and assessed in schools, with a focus on phonics. Their plan includes "revising the elementary Language curriculum and the Grade 9 English course with scientific, evidence-based approaches that emphasize direct, explicit and systematic instruction and removing references to unscientific discovery and inquiry-based learning, including the three-cueing system, by 2023." In January 2024, the province unveiled a back-to-basics kindergarten curriculum. It will provide evidence-based clear and direct instruction in literacy, including understanding sound-letter relationships, developing phonics knowledge, and using specific vocabulary.

In 2024, the province of Nova Scotia introduced a draft of its updated English Language Arts program. It outlines the essential skills for readers in grades one and two in the areas of oral language, phonological awareness, phonics and word recognition, vocabulary, reading fluency, and comprehension.

=== Finland ===
Before the beginning of school, usually at the age of 7, most children in Finland participate in one year of preprimary education. Most children already learn to read before they start school.

Since letters in Finnish words almost always represent the same sounds (and almost all sounds are represented by only one letter), most words are orthographically transparent making them comparatively easy to read.

At the primary level, reading and writing difficulties are the second most common reason (after speech disorders) for part-time special education. The most commonly used standardized reading test is the Comprehensive School Reading Test, covering linguistic awareness, "decoding", and reading comprehension. In the case of minor reading difficulties, the classroom teacher may give remedial instruction to students, whereas a special education teacher will help with more severe or more persistent reading difficulties. If these support measures are inadequate, students may receive enhanced support or be transferred to full-time special education, depending on individual teaching and learning plans.

In the fourth year of school, the basic teaching techniques consist of ample practice of "sound-letter correspondence"; breaking down speech into words, syllables, and sounds; word recognition; and spelling at the sound and sentence level; daily reading and writing; and comprehension strategies.

In 2016, among 50 countries, Finland ranked 5th in reading achievement for students in their fourth year of school according to the Progress in International Reading Literacy Study (PIRLS).

=== France ===
There has been a strong debate in France on the teaching of phonics ("méthode syllabique") versus whole language ("méthode globale"). After the 1990s, supporters of the latter started defending a so-called "mixed method" (also known as balanced literacy) in which approaches from both methods are used. France is home to some of the most influential researchers in psycho-pedagogy, cognitive sciences and neurosciences, such as Stanislas Dehaene and Michel Fayol, who support phonics.

More recently, with the appointment of the academic Jean-Michel Blanquer as minister of education, the ministry created a science educational council chaired by Dehaene. This council openly supported phonics. In April 2018, the minister issued a set of four guiding documents for early teaching of reading and mathematics and a booklet detailing phonics recommendations. Teachers unions and a few educationalists were very critical of his stances, and classified his perspective as "traditionalist", trying to bring the debate to the political sphere. But Blanquer has openly declared that the so-called mixed approach is no serious choice.

In 2016, France is slightly above average in Reading Achievement for students in their fourth year of school according to the Progress in International Reading Literacy Study (PIRLS).

=== Hungary ===
The official language and the language of instruction in the Republic of Hungary is the Hungarian language. However, in 2010 4.6% of minority students (Croatians, Germans, Romanians, Serbians, Slovaks, and Slovenes) attended minority operated mother tongue, bilingual, or language teaching schools or kindergartens.

Crèche (nursery school) in Hungary is a "welfare institution" catering for children aged 20 weeks to 3 years and providing professional day care and development. In addition, kindergarten education and care is free and compulsory for children aged 3–6. Socially disadvantaged children are given priority in enrolment. Pre-school programmes focus on developing children's emergent literacy skills through play rather than systematic training in phonics or teaching the alphabet.

According to the PIRLS Encyclopedia, the Ministry of Education does not explicitly recommend one particular reading method over another, however all the accredited textbook series use the "sounding-analyzing method". The European Literacy Policy Network (ELINET) 2016 reports that Hungarian children in grades one and two receive explicit instruction in phonemic awareness and phonics "as the route to decode words". In grades three and four they continue to apply their knowledge of phonics, however the emphasis shifts to the more meaning-focused technical aspects of reading and writing (i.e., vocabulary, types of texts, reading strategies, spelling, punctuation and grammar).

In 2016, among 50 countries, Hungary achieved the 13th highest score in reading literacy for students in their fourth year of school according to the Progress in International Reading Literacy Study (PIRLS). 19% of their students performed at or below the low benchmark on overall reading, just above the EU average of 20%.

=== Latin America and the Caribbean ===
According to the 2019 Campbell Systematic Reviews approximately 250 million children across the world are not acquiring basic reading and math skills, even though about 50% of them have spent at least 4 years in school (UNESCO 2014). And, more than 60% of third-grade students in Latin America and the Caribbean (LAC) have only achieved basic reading skills, in part because of the lack of evidence-based training, preparation and support for teachers.

The review summarizes the findings of 107 studies of early grade literacy interventions (EGL) in LAC. They conclude that teacher training, nutrition, and technology-in-education programs on average do not show positive effects on EGL outcomes in the LAC region. However, some factors have the potential for positive impacts; including combining teacher training with coaching, targeting school feeding and other nutrition programs to low-income countries with high rates of stunting and wasting, and combining technology-in-education programs with a strong focus on pedagogical practices.

They also suggest that "the quantitative nonintervention studies indicate that phonemic awareness, phonics, fluency, and comprehension are associated with reading ability", and that the poor reading levels of children "may be the consequence of not providing them with adequate instructions on meta-phonological strategies and explicit and systematic phonics". However, the available studies are unable to provide conclusive evidence on the effects of teaching phonemic awareness, phonics, fluency, and comprehension on reading ability, suggesting a need for even more high-quality research.

The Progress in International Reading Literacy Study (PIRLS 2016) describes the special reading initiatives in Trinidad and Tobago. In 2013, the National Commission for UNESCO launched the Leading for Literacy project to develop the literacy skills of grade 1 and 2 students. The project facilitates the training of primary school teachers in the use of a synthetic phonics program.

From 2013 to 2015, the Trinidad and Tobago Ministry of Education appointed seven reading specialist to help primary and secondary school teachers improve their literacy instruction. From February 2014 to January 2016, literacy coaches were hired in selected primary schools to assist teachers of Infant 1 (kindergarten), Infant 2 (Grade 1), and Standard 1 (Grade 2) with pedagogy and content of early literacy instruction. Primary schools have been provided with literacy resources for instruction, including phonemic awareness, word recognition, vocabulary manipulatives, phonics and comprehension.

=== New Zealand ===
As of 2018, the Ministry of Education in New Zealand has online information to help teachers to support their students in years 1–3 in relation to sounds, letters, and words. It has specific suggestions in the areas of oral language, phonological awareness, phonemic awareness, phonemes and phonics. There are also examples and recommended books concerning phonics instruction, hearing sounds in spoken words, syllables, phoneme blending, onset and rime, and sounds and letters (initial, ending and medial). In its introduction it states that phonics instruction "is not an end in itself" and it is not necessary to teach students "every combination of letters and sounds".

On June 14, 2024, the Minister of Education announced the most significant changes to the national curriculum since 2007. The changes are designed to be evidence-based and grounded in the science of learning. Their website includes many resources to help teachers teach phonics, such as phonics checks – guidance for schools, assessment materials, 29 phonics Cards, video guides, and Phonics Plus Supporting Games.

New Zealand's score (523) in the 2016 PIRLS report on the reading achievement of students in their fourth year of school was above the average of 500 and below other English speaking countries such as Canada (543), United States (549), England (559), Northern Ireland (565) and Ireland (567).

=== Norway ===
Norwegian is Norway's main language and English is taught beginning in grade one. Children enter first grade in August of the year they turn age 6. The majority of students are enrolled in public (government-owned) schools as opposed to private schools.

In the Norwegian curriculum, basic skills include "decoding and comprehension of simple texts" (i.e. phonics). At the end of grade two students are expected to demonstrate an understanding of the relationship between "speech sound and letter".

In 2016, among 50 countries, Norway achieved the 8th highest score in Reading Literacy for students in their fourth year of school according to the Progress in International Reading Literacy Study (PIRLS), and 20th out of 78 for 15-year-olds in PISA 2018.

=== Poland ===
The national curriculum of Poland considers reading to be the main goal of primary education, defining it as the technical skill of "decoding graphemes into phonemes and understanding, using, and processing written texts" (i.e. phonics). Instruction often consists of telling students how things should be done instead of letting them experiment for themselves and experience the results. According to researchers, teachers seldom use the internet and other digital technologies during reading instruction. Polish schools do not have trained reading specialists, however speech and educational therapists are available to assist students with special needs or learning disabilities. In 1998 a national campaign was introduced to encourage parents to read aloud to their children for 20 minutes every day.

In 2014, 10.6% of 15-year-olds had underachievement in reading, lower than the EU average of 17.8%. Beginning in 2014, a program to provide free schoolbooks was introduced gradually across Poland. Students' socioeconomic background was a matter of concern in 2015, and six year-olds commenced compulsory schooling in that year.

According to the 2000 International Student Assessment (PISA) 15‑year‑old Polish students read significantly below the OECD average. However, with a renewed emphasis on reading, by 2018 Poland made the most progress in reading since 1994 and Poles ages 16 to 19 exceeded their European peers in reading (10th out of 72 countries in PISA).

Poland ranked 6th in the 2016 PIRLS 4th grade reading achievement.

=== Portugal ===
During the late 1990s the whole language approach gained popularity in Portugal, but in a non-explicit form. Emphasis was placed on meaning, reading for pleasure, and developing a critical approach to the texts. Explicit phonemic awareness and explicit training for reading fluency were considered outdated by some teachers' organizations.

Poor results in international comparisons led parents and schools to react to this approach and to insist on direct instruction methods. Later, during minister Nuno Crato's tenure (2011–2015), who is known to be a vocal critic of constructivist approaches and a supporter of cognitive psychology findings, new standards ("metas") were put in place. The ministry convened a team led by a well-known specialist in reading, José Morais. This team introduced an explicit phonics teaching approach, putting emphasis on decoding and reading fluency.

Later, international evaluations TIMSS and PISA showed a sharp improvement in the areas of math, reading and science from 2006 to 2015. Portuguese students results raised to above OECD and IEA averages, attaining the best results ever for Portugal. The PISA reading results moved from 472 to 498, above the United States at 497. However, by 2018 Portugal had dropped slightly to 492 and the United States had increased to 505. Some analysts explain these advances by the educational measures Portugal put in place: a more demanding curricula, the emphasis on direct teaching, standardized testing, less ability streaming, and explicit fluency training in reading and mathematics.

In 2016, among 50 countries, Portugal achieved the 30th highest score in Reading Literacy for students in their fourth year of school according to the Progress in International Reading Literacy Study (PIRLS).

A 2017 study titled Effective literacy teaching practices in Portugal: a study in first grade, concluded that the best way to teach reading in the first grade was to combine "explicit instruction of the code" (phonics) with scaffolding, differentiated instruction, and text reading and writing.

=== Republic of Ireland ===
The school curriculum in Ireland focuses on ensuring children are literate in both the English language and the Irish language. In 2011, the Department of Education and Youth developed a national strategy to improve literacy and numeracy. The 2014 teachers' Professional Development guide covers the seven areas of attitude and motivation, fluency, comprehension, word identification, vocabulary, phonological awareness, phonics, and assessment. It recommends that phonics be taught in a systematic and structured way and is preceded by training in phonological awareness.

In 2016, among 50 countries, Ireland achieved the 4th highest score in Reading Literacy for students in their fourth year of school according to the Progress in International Reading Literacy Study (PIRLS).

The Programme for International Student Assessment (PISA) for 2018 showed Ireland's 15-year-old students were significantly above average in reading, science and mathematics.

The 2019 Primary Language Curriculum specifies that reading outcomes must include phonics, phonological awareness, and phonemic awareness.

=== Russia ===
According to a 1998 report in The Baltimore Sun, at the time, there was some debate in Russia about phonics versus whole language. According to one supervisor of a primary education centre at the time, most teachers in Russia would have suggested that they use phonics.

The 2016 international PISA study states that the method widely used to teach reading in the Russian Federation was developed by the famous psychologist Daniil Elkonin in the 1960s. It says, "students learn to define the sequence of sounds in a word and characterize each sound ... acquiring the knowledge of the phonetic system at an early stage" and "become better familiarized with the skills of reading".

In 1959, a journal report adds more details about the use of phonics in teaching the Russian language: it says other observers report that the Russian system in beginning reading is "strictly phonetic". However, there are no separate phonics lessons, drill periods, drill books, exercises or "gadgets" as one might have seen in typical US schools. Instead, each new letter-sound is introduced at once in meaningful words the children can pronounce as soon as they know the sound of the new letter. There are no "blending" of the sounds, or "crutches" such as equating the sound of /s/ with a snake. Instead, "all learning is by eye and ear in tandem", and the association is formed solely between the printed symbol and its sound. And finally, each lesson makes use of exercises to confirm comprehension.

Among 50 countries, the Russian Federation achieved the highest score (581) in Reading Literacy for students in their fourth year of school according to the 2016 Progress in International Reading Literacy Study (PIRLS).

=== Singapore ===
Singapore has a diverse language environment with four official languages including English which is the language of education and administration. Bilingualism is the "cornerstone" of the education system where students learn both English and their own mother tongue language in school. 99% of children attend preschool education (as early as 18 months of age) although it is not compulsory in Singapore.

The 2001 English Language Syllabus of Singapore advocated "a balance between decoding and meaning-based instruction ... phonics and whole language". However, a review in 2006 advocated for a "systematic" approach. The subsequent syllabus, in 2010, had no mention of whole language and recommended a balanced, interactive and comprehensive reading programme. It refers to Learning to Read: The Great Debate by Jeanne Chall (1967) and the National Reading Panel (2000) both of which supported systematic phonics; and the International Literacy Association (2005) that supported balanced instruction saying phonics is "necessary but insufficient".

The syllabus for 2010 advocates for a balance between "systematic and explicit instruction" and "a rich language environment". It called for increased instruction in oral language skills together with phonemic awareness and the key decoding elements of synthetic phonics, analytic phonics and analogy phonics. Specifically, it advocated for instruction in phonic's areas such as word families and rimes (e.g., jumps and jumped; bite and kite), segmenting and blending (e.g., /k/, /æ/, /t/= cat), vowels, consonants and syllables. And finally, it called for instruction in word study, grammar, vocabulary, writing and comprehension.

Singapore received the second highest reading score (576) after the Russian Federation (581) in the 2016 PIRLS report on grade four students.

=== Sweden ===
Since the 1860s it was "taken for granted" that phonics is a major part of reading instruction in the first school years in Sweden. However, in the 1990s the National Agency for Education (Sweden) encouraged teachers to try other methods, including whole language.

Sweden's performance in the international fourth grade reading assessments (PIRLS) dropped by 19 points from 2001 (561) to 2011 (542) and recovered by 13 points in 2016 (555), still lower than the 2001 results.

Some suggest that the lower scores are related to the increase in immigration.

In 2016 the European Literacy Policy Network (ELINET) published a report on literacy in Sweden saying there is an "urgent need" to address decreases in performance as measured by PIRLS and PISA.

=== United Kingdom ===
==== England ====
There has been a resurgence of interest in synthetic phonics in recent years, particularly in England. As of 2013, all (local-authority-maintained) primary schools in England have a statutory requirement to teach synthetic phonics in years one and two. In addition, any pupil who is struggling to decode words properly by year three must "urgently" receive help through a "rigorous and systematic phonics programme".

Prior to that, synthetic phonics was promoted by a cross-party group of parliamentarians, particularly Nick Gibb. A report by the House of Commons Education and Skills Committee called for a review of the phonics content in the National Curriculum. Subsequently, the Department for Education and Skills announced a review into early years reading, headed by Sir Jim Rose, former Director of Inspection for Ofsted (responsible for the education standards in England). The review, titled Independent review of the teaching of early reading (Rose Report 2006), addresses the question of why children's reading and writing (especially for boys) have not been meeting expectations. Paragraph 3.25 of the final report suggests "it is far more often the nature of the teaching than the nature of the child which determines success or failure in learning the 'basic' skills of reading and writing." It goes on to say it is not suggesting teachers are unable or unwilling to develop the required expertise, only that there has been systematic confusion and conflicting views about phonics. It also makes it clear that, when it comes to the wider knowledge and skills required for reading and writing, phonics work is "necessary but not sufficient". It concludes by suggesting the challenge will be resolved as research continues to support systematic phonics, and that teacher training and systematic phonics programs will produce "good results for children". A comment in the House of Commons on April 27, 2006, suggested that "children should be taught synthetic phonics first and fast".

By November 2010, a government white paper contained plans to train all primary school teachers in phonics. The 2013 curriculum has "statutory requirements" that, among other things, students in years one and two be capable in using systematic synthetic phonics in regards to Word Reading, Reading Comprehension, Fluency, and Writing. This includes having skills in "sound to graphemes", "decoding", and "blending". Following this, Ofsted updated their guidance for school inspectors in 2014 to include tips on how schools should teach reading with systematic phonics, including "Getting them Reading Early". It includes a description of the simple view of reading as the word recognition processes (recognizing the words on the page, free of context and using phonics) and the language recognition processes (understanding the meaning of the language). It also includes some videos to illustrate its principles.

In 2015, the Carter Review of Initial Teacher Training (published by the Department for Education calls for evidence-based teaching to be part of the framework for initial teacher training. It gives an example of a case study in which "trainees on the Early Reading placement are required to work alongside a literacy specialist to plan and teach a phonics lesson to a group, evaluate the lesson and deliver a second lesson in light of their evaluation".

The 2016 Progress in International Reading Literacy Study (PIRLS) awarded England its best results since the studies began in 2001. Nick Gibb attributes this success to the use of systematic synthetic phonics. In March of that year the Secretary of State for Education released a report titled Educational Excellence Everywhere. The report states that in 2010, 33% percent of primary school students did not achieve the expected standard in reading, "since the introduction of the phonics reading check in 2012", that number is down to 20%. The report goes on to say they still have much to do, particularly for disadvantaged students. The phonics check involves pupils reading aloud 40 words (including 20 non-words). In 2016, 81 percent of pupils reached the expected standard of 32 correct words – up from 77 percent in 2015.

In 2016, the London School of Economics published a paper supporting the teaching of synthetic phonics to disadvantaged children because it helps to close the literacy gap.

In 2018, Ofsted, as part of its curriculum research, published an online video on Early Reading wherein a regional director states "it is absolutely essential that every child master the phonic code as quickly as possible ... So, successful schools firstly teach phonics first, fast and furious."

In January 2019, Ofsted published a report titled Education inspection framework: overview of research that further supports systematic synthetic phonics together with phonemic awareness, fluency, vocabulary, and comprehension. In 2022 they published a Research review series: English that reiterates its support for "a systematic synthetic approach" to teaching reading.

While there has been concern about the phonics screening test at the end of year one, some report that phonics is especially valuable for poor readers and those whose first language is not English.

Research published in 2022 by two University College London professors does not recommend the sole use of phonics for developing children's literacy. Their work is backed up by a systematic review of 55 research papers. An article about the study, published in The Conversation concludes: "The approach to teaching reading in England means that children in England are unlikely to be learning to read as effectively as they should be. Teachers, children, and their parents need a more balanced approach to the teaching of reading." The actual research report describes balanced instruction as having a balance of teaching based on the use of whole text and the systematic teaching of the alphabetic code and other linguistic features. In this way, the comprehension of written language is balanced with a range of skills and knowledge. The report places a great deal of emphasis on the PISA study which critics say is "fundamentally flawed" and failing in its mission. The report also included an analyses of three Canadian provinces saying Canada, among English-dominant nations, is the strongest performer in PISA and PIRLS. In fact, the 2016 PIRLS report places Canada in 23rd place and England in 10th place.

==== Northern Ireland ====
In 2007 the Department of Education (DE) in Northern Ireland was required by law to teach children foundational skills in phonological awareness and the understanding "that words are made up of sounds and syllables and that sounds are represented by letters (phoneme/grapheme awareness)". In 2010 the DE went further by outlining a new strategy with standards requiring that teachers receive support in using evidence-based practices to teach literacy and numeracy. It outlined ten requirements, including a "systematic programme of high-quality phonics" that is explicit, structured, well-paced, interactive, engaging, and applied in a meaningful context.

In 2016, among 50 countries, Northern Ireland achieved the 7th highest score in Reading Literacy for students in their fourth year of school according to the Progress in International Reading Literacy Study (PIRLS).

In 2018, in the PISA Reading Performance of 15-year-old students, Northern Ireland students achieved a score of 505 as compared to England at 507 and the OECD average of 487.

==== Scotland ====
Synthetic phonics in Scotland has its roots in the Clackmannanshire Report, a seven-year study that was published in 2005. It compared analytic Phonics with synthetic Phonics and advantaged students with disadvantaged children. The report found that, using synthetic phonics, children from lower socio-economic backgrounds performed at the same level as children from advantaged backgrounds in primary school (whereas with analytic phonics teaching, they did significantly less well); and boys performed better than or as well as girls.

A five-year follow-up of the study concluded that the beneficial effects were long-lasting; in fact, the reading gains increased.

Subsequently, Education Scotland concluded that explicit, systematic phonics programs, usually embedded in a rich literacy environment, give an additional four months progress over other programs such as whole language, and are particularly beneficial for young learners (aged 4–7). There is evidence, though less secure, that synthetic phonics programs may be more beneficial than analytic phonics programs; however it is most important to teach systematically.

In the PISA 2018 reading results of 15-year-old students, Scotland's score was above average, 504 as compared to the OECD average of 487. Scotland does not participate in PIRLS.

==== Wales ====
On March 3, 2026, the Literacy Expert Panel in Wales developed "a statement of intent to support the implementation of high-quality, evidence-informed early reading instruction across Wales". This includes phonological awareness and the explicit and structured teaching of phonics. This results from the fact that Welsh pupils are not reading as well as those in other home nations, including in England where students are taught systematic synthetic phonics (the relationship between letters and sounds).

Perhaps related to this, Cardiff Council has announced a new three-year literacy initiative to reduce the reading attainment gap across the city's schools. The programme will provide universal access to a synthetic phonics programme for all Welsh and English-medium schools in Cardiff, including primary, secondary and special schools.

=== United States ===
More than a century of debate has occurred over whether English phonics should or should not be used in teaching beginning reading.

The use of phonics in education in the United States dates at least to the work of Favell Lee Mortimer, whose works using phonics includes the early flashcard set Reading Disentangled (1834) and text Reading Without Tears (1857). Despite the work of 19th-century proponents such as Rebecca Smith Pollard, some American educators, prominently Horace Mann, argued that phonics should not be taught at all. This led to the commonly used "look-say" approach ensconced in the Dick and Jane readers popular in the mid-20th century. Beginning in the 1950s, however, inspired by a landmark study by Dr. Harry E. Houtz, and spurred by Rudolf Flesch's criticism of the absence of phonics instruction (particularly in his book, Why Johnny Can't Read, 1955) and Jeanne Chall (the author of Learning to Read the Great Debate - 1967–1995 phonics resurfaced as a method of teaching reading.

In the 1980s, the "whole language" approach to reading further polarized the debate in the United States. Whole language instruction was predicated on the principle that children could learn to read given (a) proper motivation, (b) access to good literature, (c) many reading opportunities, (d) focus on meaning, and (e) instruction to help students use semantic, syntactic and graphophonic cues to "guess" the pronunciation of unknown words. Also, in practice children are often taught to use pictures to guess a word. For some advocates of whole language, phonics was antithetical to helping new readers to get the meaning; they asserted that parsing words into small chunks and reassembling them had no connection to the ideas the author wanted to convey.

The whole language emphasis on identifying words using context and focusing only a little on the sounds (usually the alphabet consonants and the short vowels) could not be reconciled with the phonics emphasis on individual sound-symbol correspondences. Thus, a dichotomy between the whole language approach and phonics emerged in the United States causing intense debate. Ultimately, this debate led to a series of Congressionally-commissioned panels and government-funded reviews of the state of reading instruction in the U.S.

In 1984, the National Academy of Education commissioned a report on the status of research and instructional practices in reading education, Becoming a Nation of Readers. Among other results, the report includes the finding that phonics instruction improves children's ability to identify words. It reports that useful phonics strategies include teaching children the sounds of letters in isolation and in words, and teaching them to blend the sounds of letters together to produce approximate pronunciations of words. It also states that phonics instruction should occur in conjunction with opportunities to identify words in meaningful sentences and stories.

In 1990, Congress asked the U.S. Department of Education (ED) to compile a list of available programs on beginning reading instruction, evaluating each in terms of the effectiveness of its phonics component. As part of this requirement, the ED asked Dr. Marilyn J. Adams to produce a report on the role of phonics instruction in beginning reading. This resulted in her 1994 book Beginning to Read: Thinking and Learning about Print. In the book, Adams asserted that existing scientific research supported that phonics is an effective way to teach students the alphabetic code – building their skills in decoding unknown words. By learning the alphabetic code, she argued, students can free up mental energy used for word analysis and devote this mental effort to meaning, leading to stronger comprehension. Furthermore, she suggested that students be encouraged not to skip words they find difficult. Instead they should take the time to study the challenging words and to reread sentences after they have succeeded in decoding them. She also concluded that while phonics instruction is a necessary component of reading instruction, it is not sufficient by itself. Children should also have practice reading text provided they do not make too many mistakes. In spite of her study, the argument about how to teach reading eventually known as "the Great Debate", continued unabated.

In 1996 the California Department of Education took an increased interest in using phonics in schools. And in 1997 the department called for grade one teaching in concepts about print, phonemic awareness, decoding and word recognition, and vocabulary and concept development.

In 1997, Congress asked the Director of the National Institute of Child Health and Human Development (NICHD) at the National Institutes of Health, in consultation with the Secretary of Education, to convene a national panel to assess the effectiveness of different approaches used to teach children to read.

The National Research Council re-examined the question of how best to teach reading to children (among other questions in education) and in 1998 published the results in the Prevention of Reading Difficulties in Young Children. The National Research Council's findings largely matched those of Adams. They concluded that phonics is a very effective way to teach children to read at the word level, more effective than what is known as the "embedded phonics" approach of whole language (where phonics was taught opportunistically in the context of literature). They found that phonics instruction must be systematic (following a sequence of increasingly challenging phonics patterns) and explicit (teaching students precisely how the patterns worked, e.g., "this is b, it stands for the /b/ sound").

In 2000 the findings of the National Reading Panel was published. It examined quantitative research studies on many areas of reading instruction, including phonics and whole language. The resulting report Teaching Children to Read: An Evidence-based Assessment of the Scientific Research Literature on Reading and its Implications for Reading Instruction provides a comprehensive review of what is known about best practices in reading instruction in the U.S. The panel reported that several reading skills are critical to becoming good readers: phonemic awareness, phonics for word identification, fluency, vocabulary and text comprehension. With regard to phonics, their meta-analysis of hundreds of studies confirmed the findings of the National Research Council: teaching phonics (and related phonics skills, such as phonemic awareness) is a more effective way to teach children early reading skills than is embedded phonics or no phonics instruction. The panel found that phonics instruction is an effective method of teaching reading for students from kindergarten through 6th grade, and for all children who are having difficulty learning to read. They also found that phonics instruction benefits all ages in learning to spell. They also reported that teachers need more education about effective reading instruction, both pre-service and in-service.

The State driven Common Core State Standards Initiative was developed in 2009, because of a lack of standardization of education principles and practices. The site has a comprehensive description of the specific details of the English Language Arts Standards that include the areas of the Alphabetic Principle, Print Concepts, Phonological Awareness, Phonics and Word Recognition, and Fluency. It is up to the individual States and School Districts to develop plans to implement the standards. As of 2020, 41 States had adopted the standards, and in most cases it has taken three or more years to have them implemented. For example, Wisconsin adopted the standards in 2010, implemented them in the 2014–2015 school year, yet in 2020 the state Department of Public Instruction was in the process of developing materials to support the standards in teaching phonics.

The State of Mississippi passed the Literacy-Based Promotion Act in 2013 in part because of the States' poor showing in the National Assessment of Educational Progress. The Mississippi Department of Education provides resources for teachers in the areas of phonemic awareness, phonics, vocabulary, fluency, comprehension and reading strategies. In 2019 Mississippi made a bigger advance in reading than any other State.

In 2014 the California Department of Education stated "Ensuring that children know how to decode regularly spelled one-syllable words by mid-first grade is crucial". It goes on to say that "Learners need to be phonemically aware (especially able to segment and blend phonemes)". In grades two and three children receive explicit instruction in advanced phonic-analysis and reading multi-syllabic and more complex words.

In 2015 the New York State Public School system began a process to revise its English Language Arts Learning Standards. The new standards call for teaching involving "reading or literacy experiences" as well as phonemic awareness from prekindergarten to grade 1 and phonics and word recognition from grade 1 to grade 4.

In 2015 the Ohio Legislature set minimum standards requiring the use of phonics as a technique in teaching reading. It includes guidelines for teaching phonemic awareness, phonics, fluency, vocabulary and comprehension. In February 2017, the Ohio Department of Education adopted new learning standards for English Language Arts. They include Reading Standards for Foundational Skills K–12 that clearly lay out a systematic approach to teaching phonological awareness in kindergarten and grade one, and grade-level phonics and word analysis skills in decoding words (including fluency and comprehension) in grades one through five.

In 2016 the What Works Clearinghouse and the Institute of Education Sciences, an independent and non-partisan arm of the U.S. Department of Education, published an Educator's Practice Guide (with evidence) on Foundational Skills to Support Reading for Understanding in Kindergarten Through 3rd Grade. It contains four recommendations to support reading: 1) Teach students academic language skills, including the use of inferential and narrative language, and vocabulary knowledge, 2) Develop awareness of the segments of sounds in speech and how they link to letters (phonemic awareness and phonics), 3) Teach students to decode words, analyze word parts, and write and recognize words (phonics and synthetic phonics), and 4) Ensure that each student reads connected text every day to support reading accuracy, fluency, and comprehension. Some universities have created additional material based on this guide.

In 2016, Colorado Department of Education updated their Elementary Teacher Literacy Standards with a comprehensive outline including standards for development in the areas Phonology; Phonics and Word Recognition; Fluent Automatic Reading; Vocabulary; Text Comprehension; and Handwriting, Spelling, and Written Expression. At the same time, the Department of Education in Delaware produced a plan to improve education results. It states that teachers' preparation programs must include evidence-based practices, including the five essential components of reading instruction (phonemic awareness, phonics, fluency, vocabulary, and comprehension).

In 2017, research published in the Journal of Experimental Psychology has shown that learning to read by sounding out words (i.e. phonics) has a dramatic impact on the accuracy of reading aloud and comprehension. It concludes that early literacy education should focus on the systematic approach in "print-to-sound relationships" in alphabetic languages, rather than teaching "meaning-based strategies", in order to enhance both reading aloud and comprehension of written words.

In 2018 The Association for Psychological Science published an article titled Ending the Reading Wars: Reading Acquisition From Novice to Expert. The purpose of the article is to fill the gap between the current research knowledge and the public understanding about how we learn to read, and to explain "why phonics instruction is so central to learning in a writing system such as English".

In 2018 the Arkansas Department of Education, Literacy Support Unit, published a report about their new initiative known as R.I.S.E., Reading Initiative for Student Excellence, that was the result of The Right to Read Act, passed in 2017. The first goal of this initiative is to provide educators with the in-depth knowledge and skills of "the science of reading" and evidence-based instructional strategies. This includes a change of focus to research-based instruction on phonological awareness, phonics, vocabulary, fluency, and comprehension. Specific requirements are that reading instruction be systematic and explicit, and include decoding techniques. Part of the instruction involves the use of a book and study guide titled Essentials of Assessing, Preventing and Overcoming Reading Difficulties, by David Kilpatrick.

In 2018 the Minnesota Reading Corps (MRC) published impact evaluation reports of their reading programs for children in pre-kindergarten to grade three (2017–2018). MRC is a participating organization under Americorps in which volunteers tutor at-risk students who need extra support in reading and math. The tutors are trained to use research-based literacy activities and interventions as identified by the National Reading Panel, including phonological awareness, phonics, fluency, vocabulary, and comprehension. The reports, presented by NORC at the University of Chicago, compare the results of students in the MRC program with students in control groups. They found that MRC kindergarten students achieved significantly higher scores in letter-sound fluency, and MRC first grade students achieved significantly higher scores in both nonsense word fluency and oral reading fluency.

In 2019 the Minnesota Department of Education introduced standards requiring school districts to "develop a Local Literacy Plan to ensure that all students have achieved early reading proficiency by no later than the end of third grade" in accordance with a Statute of the Minnesota Legislature requiring elementary teachers to be able to implement comprehensive, scientifically based reading and oral language instruction in the five reading areas of phonemic awareness, phonics, fluency, vocabulary, and comprehension.

In 2019 the International Literacy Association released a report titled Meeting the Challenges of Early Literacy Phonics Instruction The report clearly supports the use of phonics instruction that is explicit and systematic, stating that "phonics instruction is helpful for all students, harmful for none, and crucial for some". It also offers an opinion on the ten most common causes of Phonics Instructional Failure, namely: inadequate time devoted to mastering a new phonics skill such as blending (4–6 weeks recommended); lack of application to real reading instruction; inappropriate reading material to practice the skills; too much teacher instruction, and too little reading by the student; lost time during instructional transitions; the teacher's attitude and knowledge of phonics instructional material; lessons that are not fast-paced and rigorous; lack of assessments over an extended period of time; waiting too long to transition to multi-syllable words; and over-emphasis of phonics drills at the expense of other aspects such as vocabulary.

In 2019, the Best Evidence Encyclopedia, part of Johns Hopkins University, released a review of research on 61 studies of 48 different programs for struggling readers in elementary schools. It concluded that:

- Outcomes were positive for one-to-one tutoring
- Outcomes were positive but not as large for one-to-small group tutoring
- There were no differences in outcomes between teachers and teaching assistants as tutors
- Technology-supported adaptive instruction did not have positive outcomes
- Whole-class approaches (mostly cooperative learning) and whole-school approaches incorporating tutoring obtained outcomes for struggling readers as large as those found for one-to-one tutoring, and benefitted many more students
- Approaches mixing classroom and school improvements, with tutoring for the most at-risk students, have the greatest potential for the largest numbers of struggling readers

In 2019, 52.8% of Louisiana's third-graders scored at or above the State's reading benchmark. Also in 2019, 26% of grade 4 students were reading at a proficiency level according to the Nation's Report Card. In that same year, the Louisiana State Legislature passed resolution 222 urging the Department of Education to create the Early Literacy Commission to make recommendations to implement a system providing effective evidence-based reading instruction for children from birth through third grade. On March 8, 2019, the Louisiana Department of Education revised their curriculum for K–12 English Language Arts. Its Reading Standards for Foundational Skills includes requirements for instruction in the alphabetic principle, phonological awareness, phonics and word recognition, fluency and comprehension. Effective in 2020 The Louisiana Board of Elementary and Secondary Education (BESE) screens for the following skills: Kindergarten-Phonemic Awareness; First Grade-Phonics; Second Grade-Oral Reading Fluency; and Third Grade-Reading Comprehension.

In 2019, 30% of grade 4 students in Texas were reading at the "proficiency level" according to the Nation's Report Card, as compared to the National Average of 34%. In June of that same year the Texas Legislature passed House Bill 3 (HB 3 Reading Academies) requiring all kindergarten through grade-three teachers and principals to "begin a teacher literacy achievement academy before the 2022–2023 school year". The training is anticipated to be a total of 80 hours. The goal is to "increase teacher knowledge and implementation of evidence-based practices to positively impact student literacy achievement". The required content of the academies' training includes the areas of Science of Teaching Reading, Oral Language, Phonological Awareness, Decoding (i.e. Phonics), Fluency and Comprehension.

In 2016, among 50 countries, the United States achieved the 15th highest score in Reading Literacy for students in their fourth year of school according to the Progress in International Reading Literacy Study (PIRLS). Of 78 countries, the United States ranked 14th in reading for the international PISA study for 15-year-old students. In 2019, with respect to the nation's grade-four public school students, 34% performed at or above the Nations Report Card "proficient level" (solid academic performance) and 65% performed at or above the NAEP "basic level" (partial mastery of the proficient level skills).

In 2021, the State of Connecticut passed an act concerning the "right to read" that will take effect in 2023. It requires education standards that are evidenced-based and scientifically based and focused on competency in the five areas of reading: phonemic awareness, phonics, fluency, vocabulary development, and reading fluency, including oral skills and reading comprehension. In the same year, the state of North Carolina passed a bill requiring that the teaching of reading be based on the science of reading.

Between 2013 and 2022, 30 States have passed laws or implemented new policies related to evidence-based reading instruction. In some instances, this requires the teaching of phonics in an explicit and systematic manner. However, these requirements are not uniform and may prove difficult to implement as "old practices prove hard to shake".

In 2023, New York City set about to require schools to teach reading with an emphasis on phonics. In that city, less than half of the students from the third grade to the eighth grade of school scored as proficient on state reading exams. More than 63% of Black and Hispanic test-takers did not make the grade. Elementary school teachers will have to implement one of three comprehensive reading programs over the next couple of years. The United Federation of Teachers celebrated the announcement, but the local principals union was "not satisfied" with the lack of choice. All but two of the school superintendents chose the most traditional of the three choices, with explicit and systematic instruction in foundational literacy skills such as vocabulary and reading comprehension.

The University of Florida Literacy Institute has released its UFLI Foundations Toolbox containing 128 lessons in teaching reading using phonics.

== See also ==
- Allograph – Distinct shapes of a written symbol
- Alphabetic principle – Predictable and systematic relationship between letters and spoken sounds
- Balanced literacy – Theory of teaching reading and writing
- Decodable text – Type of text often used in beginning reading instruction
- Dual-route hypothesis to reading aloud – Theory of two separate mental mechanisms
- Dyslexia – Learning disability affecting reading
- English orthography – Norms for writing the English language
- Initial Teaching Alphabet – Aid for teaching English reading
- List of phonics programs
- Phonemic awareness – Subset of phonological awareness
- Phonemic orthography – Orthography in which the graphemes correspond to the phonemes of the language
- Reading § Learning to read
- Reading § Teaching reading
- Reading recovery – Early literacy intervention
- Science of reading – Taking in the meaning of letters or symbols
- Structured literacy – System of teaching reading
- Synthetic phonics – Teaching reading by blending and segmenting the sounds of the letters
