= Phonemic awareness =

Subset of phonological awareness

Phonemic awareness is a part of phonological awareness in which listeners are able to hear, identify and manipulate phonemes, the smallest mental units of sound that help to differentiate units of meaning (morphemes). Separating the spoken word "cat" into three distinct phonemes, /k/, /æ/, and /t/, requires phonemic awareness. The US National Reading Panel has found that phonemic awareness improves children's word reading and reading comprehension and helps children learn to spell. Phonemic awareness is the basis for learning phonics.

Phonemic awareness and phonological awareness are often confused since they are interdependent. Phonemic awareness is the ability to hear and manipulate individual phonemes. Phonological awareness includes this ability, but it also includes the ability to hear and manipulate larger units of sound, such as onsets and rimes and syllables.

== Impact on reading development ==
Studies by Vickie Snider have shown that phonemic awareness has a direct correlation with students' ability to read as they get older. Phonemic awareness builds a foundation for students to understand the rules of the English language. This in turn allows each student to apply these skills and increase his or her oral reading fluency and understanding of the text. Explicit and systematic instruction in phonemic awareness better supports students transfer and apply component skills to the activity of reading. There are studies also demonstrating this for student's learning to read in non-English language.

== Phonemic awareness instruction ==
Phonemic awareness relates to the ability to distinguish and manipulate individual sounds, such as /f/, /ʊ/, and /t/ in the case of foot. The following are common phonemic awareness skills practiced with students:

- Phoneme isolation: which requires recognizing the individual sounds in words, for example, "Tell me the first sound you hear in the word paste" (/p/).
- Phoneme identity: which requires recognizing the common sound in different words, for example, "Tell me the sound that is the same in bike, boy and bell" (/b/).
- Phoneme substitution: in which one can turn a word (such as "cat") into another (such as "hat") by substituting one phoneme (such as /h/) for another (/k/). Phoneme substitution can take place for initial sounds (cat-hat), middle sounds (cat-cut) or ending sounds (cat-cap).
- Oral segmenting: The teacher says a word, for example, "ball", and students say the individual sounds, /b/, /ɔː/, and /l/.
- Oral blending: The teacher says each sound, for example, "/b/, /ɔː/, /l/" and students respond with the word, "ball".
- Sound deletion: The teacher says a word, has students repeat it, and then instructs students to repeat the word without the first sound. For example, the teacher might say "now say 'bill' without the /b/", which students should respond to with "ill".
- Onset-rime manipulation: which requires isolation, identification, segmentation, blending, or deletion of onsets (the single consonant or blend that precedes the vowel and following consonants), for example, j-ump, st-op, str-ong.

There are other phonemic awareness activities, such as sound substitution, where students are instructed to replace one sound with another; sound addition, where students add sounds to words; and sound switching, where students manipulate the order of the phonemes. These are more complex but research supports the use of the three listed above, particularly oral segmenting and oral blending.

== English language learners ==
Phonemic awareness (PA) instruction has been shown to support English as a second language and foreign language learning. Johnson and Tweedie's (2010) study applied direct PA instruction to young English as a foreign language (EFL) learners in rural Malaysia. Those children given direct PA instruction achieved significantly greater test scores than a control group. PA accelerated the acquisition of relevant literacy and numeracy skills in this case. The study suggested that direct PA instruction might assist in closing existing literacy gaps between urban and rural children.

Adult English language learners (ELLs) may also benefit from direct PA instruction. A study of Arabic-speaking ELLs in an English for Academic Purposes (EAP) program showed substantial gains in vowel recognition and improved C-test scores after PA tuition, despite concerns of the researchers that adult ELLs may negatively perceive PA instruction as a "childish" approach.

== See also ==
- Auditory processing disorder
- Phonics
- Phonological awareness
- Synthetic phonics
- Spoonerism
