= Teaching reading =

Teaching reading has significant differences between teaching reading for alphabetic languages and for logographic languages.

== For alphabetic languages ==
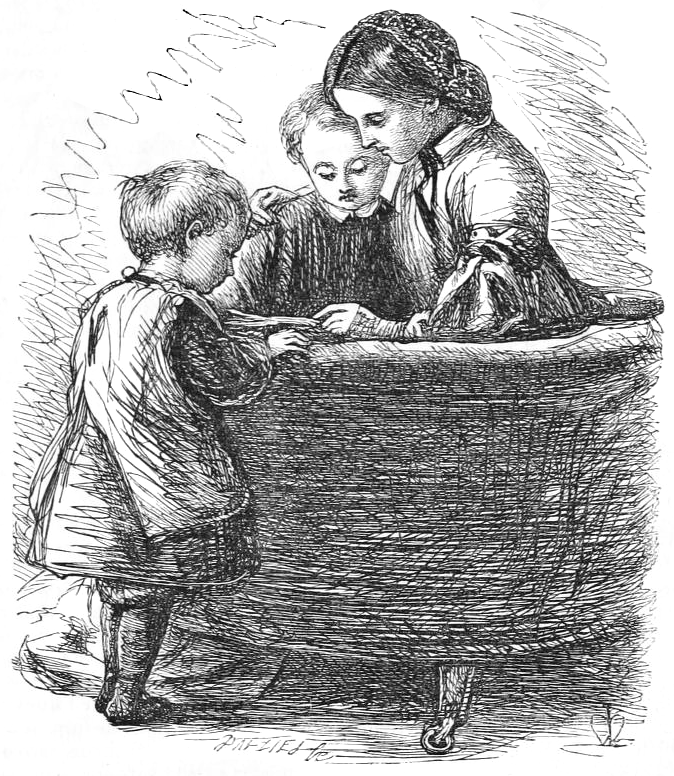
Reading to children has many benefits; however, for most children it is not sufficient to teach them how to read. For that "all teaching should be initially focused on a single goal, the grasp of the alphabetic principle whereby each letter or grapheme represents a phoneme".

Educators have debated for years about which method is best to teach reading for the English language. There are three main methods: phonics, whole language and balanced literacy. There are also a variety of other areas and practices such as phonemic awareness, fluency, reading comprehension, sight words and sight vocabulary, the three-cueing system (the searchlights model in England), guided reading, shared reading, and leveled reading. Each practice is employed in different manners depending on the country and the specific school division.

The 2001 monograph "How Psychological Science Informs the Teaching of Reading," written by five cross-institutional authors and published in Psychological Science in the Public Interest, advanced the following two conclusions on the teaching of reading: 1) "mastering the alphabetic principle is essential" and 2) "instructional techniques (namely, phonics) that teach this principle directly are more effective than those that do not." While the authors make clear they have fundamental disagreements with some of the claims made by advocates of whole-language instruction, they acknowledge that some principles of a whole-language approach have value, such as the need to ensure that students are enthusiastic about books and eager to learn to read.

== Phonics and related areas ==
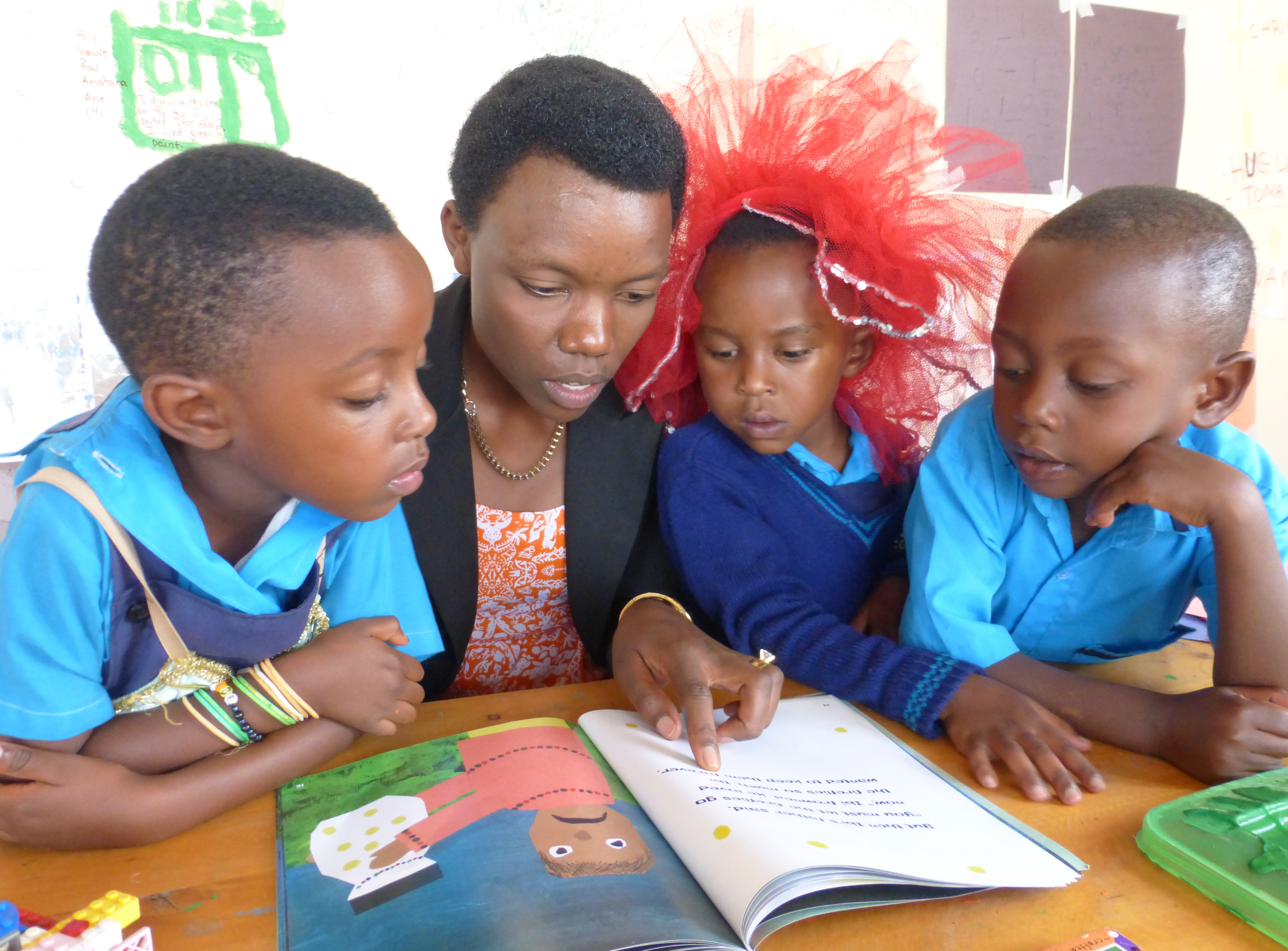
Students learning phonics through a textbook.

Phonics is a method for teaching reading and writing to beginners. To use phonics is to teach the relationship between the sounds of the spoken language (phonemes), and the letters (graphemes) or groups of letters or syllables of the written language. Phonics is also known as the alphabetic principle or the alphabetic code. It can be used with any writing system that is alphabetic, such as that of English, Russian, and most other languages. Phonics is also sometimes used as part of the process of teaching people from China (and other foreign students) to read and write Chinese characters, which are not alphabetic, using pinyin, which is alphabetic.

While the principles of phonics generally apply regardless of the language or region, the examples in this article are from General American English pronunciation. For more about phonics as it applies to British English, see Synthetic phonics, a method by which the student learns the sounds represented by letters and letter combinations, and blends these sounds to pronounce words.

Phonics is taught using a variety of approaches:

- learning individual sounds and their corresponding letters (e.g., the word cat has three letters and three sounds c - a - t, (in IPA: /k/, /æ/, /t/), whereas the word shape has five letters but three sounds: sh - a - p (in IPA: /ʃ/, /eɪ/, /p/)
- learning the sounds of letters or groups of letters, at the word level, such as similar sounds (e.g., cat, can, call), syllables (e.g., pen-cil and al-pha-bet), rhymes, i.e., rhyming syllables (e.g., hat, mat and sat), or consonant blends (also consonant clusters in linguistics, e.g., bl as in black and st as in last)
- having students read books, play games and perform activities that contain the sounds they are learning

== Whole language and related areas ==
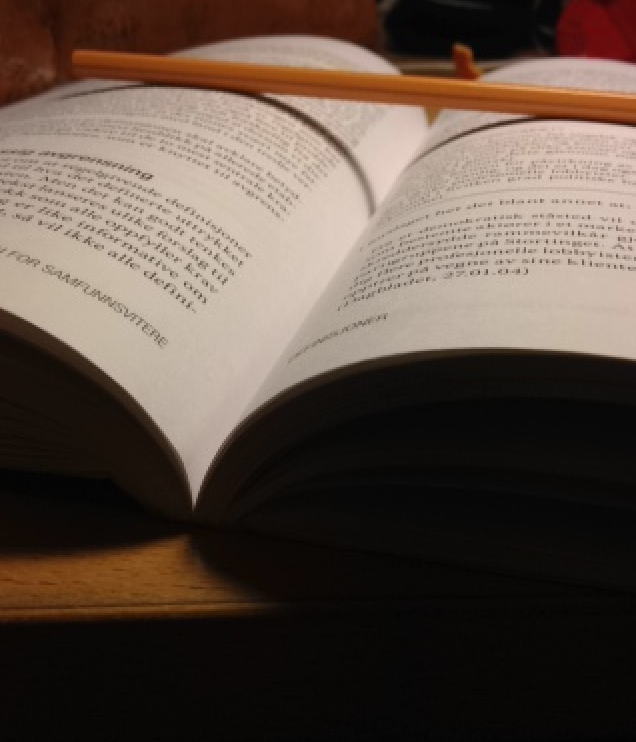
Although widely used, whole-word methods are not supported by science.

Whole language has the reputation of being a meaning-based method of teaching reading that emphasizes literature and text comprehension. It discourages any significant use of phonics, if at all. Instead, it trains students to focus on words, sentences and paragraphs as a whole rather than letters and sounds. Students are taught to use context and pictures to "guess" words they do not recognize, or even just skip them and read on. It aims to make reading fun, yet many students struggle to figure out the specific rules of the language on their own, which causes the student's decoding and spelling to suffer.

The following are some features of the whole language philosophy:

- Children are expected to learn to read and write as they learned to talk, that is gradually, without a great deal of direct instruction. (However, researchers and neuroscientists say that learning to read, unlike learning to talk, is not a natural process and many learners require explicit instruction. They point out that millions of adults can speak their language just fine, yet they cannot read their language.)
- Learning is emphasized more than teaching. It is assumed that the students will learn to read and write, and the teacher facilitates that growth.
- Students read and write every day in a variety of situations.
- Reading, writing, and spoken language are not considered separate components of the curriculum or merely ends in themselves; rather they permeate everything the students are doing.
- There is no division between first learning to read and later reading to learn.

As of 2020, whole language is widely used in the US and Canada (often as balanced literacy); however, in some US States and many other countries, such as Australia and the United Kingdom, it has lost favor or been abandoned because it is not supported by evidence. Some notable researchers have clearly stated their disapproval of whole language and whole-word teaching. In his 2009 book, Reading in the brain, cognitive neuroscientist, Stanislas Dehaene, said "cognitive psychology directly refutes any notion of teaching via a 'global' or 'whole language' method". He goes on to talk about "the myth of whole-word reading", saying it has been refuted by recent experiments. "We do not recognize a printed word through a holistic grasping of its contours, because our brain breaks it down into letters and graphemes". In addition, cognitive neuroscientist Mark Seidenberg, in his 2017 book Language at the speed of light, refers to whole language as a "theoretical zombie" because it persists despite a lack of supporting evidence.

=== Balanced literacy ===
Balanced literacy is not well defined; however, it is intended as a method that combines elements of both phonics and whole language. According to a survey in 2010, 68% of elementary school teachers in the United States profess to use balanced literacy. However, only 52% of teachers in the United States include phonics in their definition of balanced literacy.

The National Reading Panel concluded that phonics must be integrated with instruction in phonemic awareness, vocabulary, fluency, and comprehension. And, some studies indicate that "the addition of language activities and tutoring to phonics produced larger effects than any of these components in isolation". They suggest that this may be a constructive way to view balanced reading instruction.

However, balanced literacy has received criticism from researchers and others suggesting that, in many instances, it is merely whole language by another name.

According to phonics advocate and cognitive neuroscientist Mark Seidenberg, balanced literacy allows educators to defuse the reading wars while not making specific recommendations for change. He goes on to say that, in his opinion, the high number of struggling readers in the United States is the result of how teachers are taught to teach reading. He also says that struggling readers should not be encouraged to skip a challenging word, nor rely on pictures or semantic and syntactic cues to "guess at" a challenging word. Instead, they should use evidence-based decoding methods such as systematic phonics.

=== Three cueing system (Searchlights model) ===
The three-cueing system (the searchlights model in England) is a theory that has been circulating since the 1980s, yet it is not supported by research. Its roots are in the theories proposed in the 1960s by Ken Goodman and Marie Clay that eventually became whole language, reading recovery and guided reading (e.g., Fountas and Pinnell early reading programs). As of 2010, 75% of teachers in the United States teach the three-cueing system. It proposes that children who are stuck on a word should use various "cues" to figure it out and determine (guess) its meaning. The "meaning cues" are semantic ("does it make sense in the context?"), syntactic (is it a noun, verb, etc.?) and graphophonic (what are the letter-sound relationships?). It is also known as MSV (Meaning, Sentence structure/syntax and Visual information such as the letters in the words).

However, researchers such as cognitive neuroscientists Mark Seidenberg and Timothy Shanahan do not support the theory. They say the three-cueing system's value in reading instruction "is a magnificent work of the imagination", and it developed not because teachers lack integrity, commitment, motivation, sincerity, or intelligence, but because they "were poorly trained and advised" about the science of reading. Furthermore, Timothy Shanahan says, "I suspect that much of the three-cueing instruction is worthless at best and somewhat misleading at worst".

They also say, while a cueing system does help students to "make better guesses", it does not help when the words become more sophisticated, and it reduces the amount of practice time available to learn essential decoding skills.

Nell Duke, a professor of literacy, language, and culture at the University of Michigan School of Education says that "after the child has correctly read a sentence ... then they can use context to figure out the meaning of any word they don't understand".

In the US, at least 11 states prohibit three-cueing in schools, and other States are considering doing so.

In England, the simple view of reading and synthetic phonics are intended to replace "the searchlights multi-cueing model".

The Department of Education in Ontario, Canada, issued a statement saying they are "revising the elementary Language curriculum and the Grade 9 English course with scientific, evidence-based approaches that emphasize direct, explicit and systematic instruction, and removing references to unscientific discovery and inquiry-based learning, including the three-cueing system, by 2023."

=== Three Ps (3Ps) – Pause Prompt Praise ===
The three Ps approach is used by teachers, tutors, and parents to guide oral reading practice with a struggling reader. For some, it is merely a variation of the above-mentioned three-cueing system.

However, for others it is very different. For example: when a student encounters a word they do not know or get it wrong, the three steps are: 1) pause to see if they can fix it themselves, even letting them read on a little, 2) prompt them with strategies to find the correct pronunciation, and 3) praise them directly and genuinely. In the prompt step, the tutor does not suggest the student skip the word or guess the word based on the pictures or the first sound. Instead, they encourage students to use their decoding training to sound out the word and use the context (meaning) to confirm they have found the correct word.

=== Guided reading, reading workshop, shared reading, leveled reading, silent reading (and self-teaching) ===
Guided reading is small group reading instruction that is intended to allow for the differences in students' reading abilities. While they are reading, students are encouraged to use strategies from the three-cueing system, the searchlights model, or MSV.

It is no longer supported by the Primary National Strategy in England as synthetic phonics is the officially recognized method for teaching reading.

In the United States, guided reading is part of the Reading Workshop model of reading instruction.

The reading workshop model provides students with a collection of books, allows them the choice of what to read, limits students' reading to texts that can be easily read by them, provides teaching through mini-lessons, and monitors and supports reading comprehension development through one-on-one teacher-student conferences. Some reports state that it is 'unlikely to lead to literacy success' for all students, particularly those lacking foundational skills.

Shared (oral) reading is an activity whereby the teacher and students read from a shared text that is determined to be at the students' reading level.

Leveled reading involves students reading from "leveled books" at an appropriate reading level. A student who struggles with a word is encouraged to use a cueing system (e.g. three-cueing, searchlights model or MSV) to guess its meaning. Many systems purport to gauge the students' reading levels using scales incorporating numbers, letters, colors, and lexile readability scores.

Silent reading (and self-teaching) is a common practice in elementary schools. A 2007 study in the United States found that, on average only 37% of class time was spent on active reading instruction or practice, and the most frequent activity was students reading silently. Based on the limited available studies on silent reading, the NRP concluded that independent silent reading did not prove an effective practice when used as the only type of reading instruction to develop fluency and other reading skills – particularly with students who have not yet developed critical alphabetic and word reading skills.

Other studies indicate that, unlike silent reading, "oral reading increases phonological effects".

According to some, the classroom method called DEAR (Drop everything and read) is not the best use of classroom time for students who are not yet fluent. However, according to the self-teaching hypothesis, when fluent readers practice decoding words while reading silently, they learn what whole words look like (spelling), leading to improved fluency and comprehension.

The suggestion is: "if some students are fluent readers, they could read silently while the teacher works with the struggling readers".

=== Reading wars: phonics vs. whole language ===
For decades, the merits of phonics vs. whole language have been debated. It is sometimes referred to as the reading wars.

Phonics was a popular way to learn reading in the 19th century. William Holmes McGuffey (1800–1873), an American educator, author, and Presbyterian minister who had a lifelong interest in teaching children, compiled the first four of the McGuffey Readers in 1836.

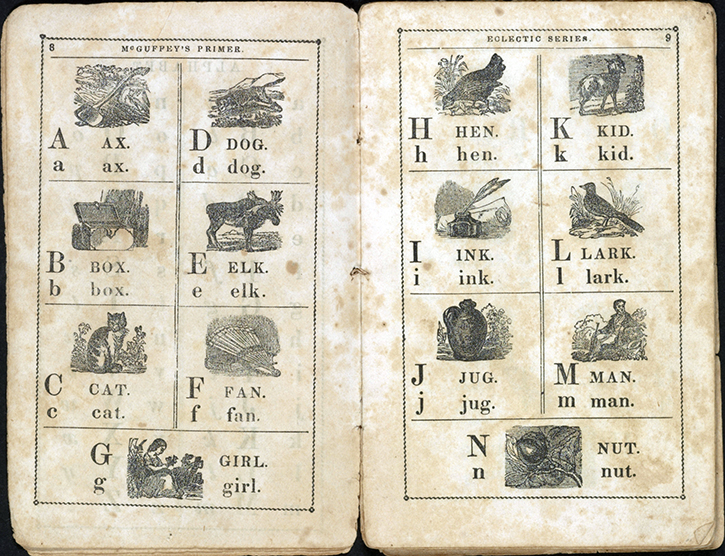
McGuffey's Primer 1836

In 1841 Horace Mann, the Secretary of the Massachusetts Board of Education, advocated for a whole-word method of teaching reading to replace phonics. Others advocated for a return to phonics, such as Rudolf Flesch in his book Why Johnny Can't Read (1955).

The whole-word method received support from Kenneth J. Goodman who wrote an article in 1967 entitled Reading: A psycholinguistic guessing game. In it, he says efficient reading is the result of the "skill in selecting the fewest, most productive cues necessary to produce guesses which are right the first time". Although not supported by scientific studies, the theory became very influential as the whole language method. At the same time, Marie Clay, the creator of the often criticized Reading recovery program suggested that young readers use "multiple clues from the text" as well as content to read. Since the 1970s some whole language supporters such as Frank Smith, are unyielding in arguing that phonics should be taught little, if at all.

Yet, other researchers say instruction in phonics and phonemic awareness are "critically important" and "essential" to developing early reading skills. In 2000, the National Reading Panel (U.S.) identified five ingredients of effective reading instruction, of which phonics is one, and the other four are phonemic awareness, fluency, vocabulary and comprehension. Reports from other countries, such as the Australian report on Teaching reading (2005) and the U.K. Independent review of the teaching of early reading (Rose Report 2006) have also supported the use of phonics.

Some notable researchers such as Stanislas Dehaene and Mark Seidenberg have clearly stated their disapproval of whole language.

Furthermore, a 2017 study in the UK that compared teaching with phonics vs. teaching whole written words concluded that phonics is more effective, saying "our findings suggest that interventions aiming to improve the accuracy of reading aloud and/or comprehension in the early stages of learning should focus on the systematicity present in print-to-sound relationships, rather than attempting to teach direct access to the meanings of whole written words".

More recently, some educators have advocated for the theory of balanced literacy purported to combine phonics and whole language yet not necessarily consistently or systematically. It may include elements such as word study and phonics mini-lessons, differentiated learning, cueing, leveled reading, shared reading, guided reading, independent reading, and sight words. According to a survey in 2010, 68% of K–2 teachers in the United States practice balanced literacy; however, only 52% of teachers included phonics in their definition of balanced literacy. In addition, 75% of teachers teach the three-cueing system (i.e., meaning/structure/visual or semantic/syntactic/graphophonic) that has its roots in whole language.

In addition, some phonics supporters assert that balanced literacy is merely whole language by another name. And critics of whole language and sceptics of balanced literacy, such as neuroscientist Mark Seidenberg, state that struggling readers should not be encouraged to skip words they find puzzling or rely on semantic and syntactic cues to guess words.

Over time a growing number of countries and states have put greater emphasis on phonics and other evidence-based practices. This has focused attention on Systematic phonics and Structured literacy. (see Phonics practices by country or region).

== Tutoring in reading ==
The use of tutoring to improve academic performance, including reading skills, is increasing. A multi-level study in 2023 about "High-Dosage Tutoring" programs for beginning readers concluded that "a convincing and robust body of research provides evidence that tutoring is an effective intervention to accelerate student learning, particularly for students that perform below academic thresholds".

One-to-one tutoring is the most effective intervention for improving the reading achievement of struggling elementary school students, with a medium effect size of 0.41. Small-group tutoring also improves students' literacy, with a small effect size of 0.24. A follow-up study to the NRP concluded that, when added together, the combined effect of systematic phonics instruction (d=.24), effective one-to-one tutoring (d=.40), and systematic language activities (syntax, morphology, and etymology, d=.29) "may triple the effect of phonics alone".

Another study suggests that phonologically based reading instruction for first-graders at risk for learning disabilities can be delivered by non-teachers. In the study, non-certified tutors gave students intensive one-to-one tutoring for 30 minutes, 4 days a week for one school year. The students outperformed untutored control students on measures of reading, spelling, and decoding; with effect sizes ranging from .42 to 1.24. The tutoring included instruction in phonological skills, letter-sound correspondence, explicit decoding, rime analysis, writing, spelling, and reading phonetically controlled text. Although the effects diminished at the end of second grade, the tutored students continued to significantly outperform untutored students in decoding and spelling.

Robert Slavin, of Best evidence Encyclopedia, says "only tutoring, both one-to-one and one-to-small group, in reading and mathematics, had an effect size larger than +0.10 ... averages are around +0.30", and "well-trained teaching assistants using structured tutoring materials or software can obtain outcomes as good as those obtained by certified teachers as tutors". Other studies conclude that programs using non-teacher tutors can produce reading improvements for first-grade students, if the programs are carefully designed and structured, and tutors receive regular training and supervision.

A meta-analysis in 2023 found that so-called high-impact tutoring increased achievement by 3 to 15 months of learning across grade levels, and the best results came from programs that a) use teachers or paraprofessionals as tutors, b) are held in earlier grades, c) occur at least 3 days per week, and d) are held during school.

According to a report in January 2026, the San Francisco school district is expanding a tutoring program in which the percentage of participating students reading at grade level increased from 24% to 54%.

Not all tutoring programs produce the expected results. This is because, in part, "larger programs tend to have higher student-tutor ratios and less time spent in tutoring than smaller programs". In addition, with larger programs the quality of delivery and implementation is reduced.

One study suggests schools should start tutoring programs early rather than wait until students show signs of struggling. However, tutoring programs can cost between $1,000 and $4,000 per student.

Many parents seek out private tutors because they are unhappy with the results they see from their child's education system. However, those parents often face challenges when hiring private literacy tutors, including high demand, long waitlists, limited knowledge, a lack of tutors in their area, inadequately trained tutors, and costs. A study in Ontario, Canada, found that many families paid all or part of a psychoeducational assessment outside of the school, at an average cost to the parents of $1,800. In addition, most parents who accessed private tutoring services paid the median cost of $3,500.

== For logographic languages ==

Languages such as Chinese and Japanese are normally written (fully or partly) in logograms (hanzi and kanji, respectively), which represent a whole word or morpheme with a single character. There are a large number of characters, and the sound that each makes must be learned directly or from other characters that contain "hints" in them. For example, in Japanese, the On-reading of the kanji 民 is min and the related kanji 眠 shares the same On-reading, min: the right-hand part shows the character's pronunciation. However, this is not true for all characters. Kun readings, on the other hand, have to be learned and memorized as there is no way to tell from each character.

Ruby characters are used in textbooks to help children learn the sounds that each logogram makes. These are written in a smaller size, using an alphabetic or syllabic script. For example, hiragana is typically used in Japanese, and the pinyin romanization into Latin alphabet characters is used in Chinese.

漢 / か ん; 字 / じ	or	かん / じ; 漢 / 字

The examples above each spell the word kanji, which is made up of two kanji characters: 漢 (kan, written in hiragana as かん), and 字 (ji, written in hiragana as じ).

Textbooks are sometimes edited as a cohesive set across grades so that children will not encounter characters they are not yet expected to have learned.

== International research reports about best practices ==
Beginning in 2000, several reading research reports were published, together with their conclusions about the best ways to teach reading:

=== 2000 – National Reading Panel (NRP) (U.S.) ===
The NRP identified five ingredients of effective reading instruction: phonemic awareness, phonics, fluency, vocabulary, and comprehension and concluded that systematic phonics instruction is more effective than unsystematic phonics instruction or those with no phonics instruction.

=== 2005 – Teaching Reading, National Inquiry into the Teaching of Literacy (Australia 2005-The Rowe Report) ===
This report supports the use of systematic phonics.

=== 2006 – Independent review of the teaching of early reading (Rose Report 2006) (England) ===
The Rose Report supports systematic synthetic phonics.

=== 2022 – Right to Read inquiry report (R2R) (Canada) ===
The R2R report from the Ontario Human Rights Commission (OHRC) says that teachers need to be trained in evidence-based instruction methods and concludes that Structured literacy "is the most effective way to teach early reading".
