= Science of reading =

Study of reading and its acquisition

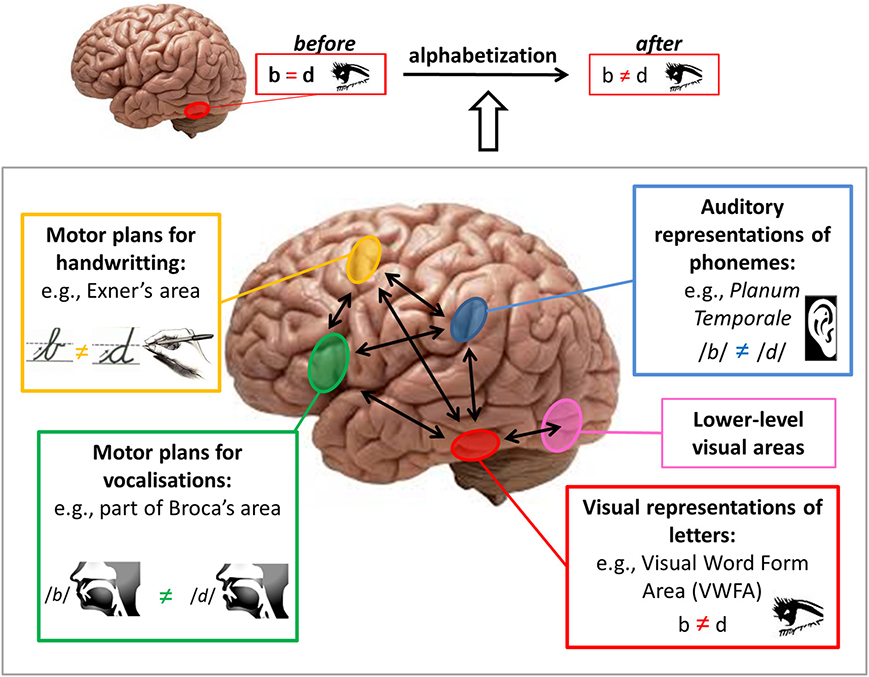
Writing is only about 5,500 years old, unlike human speech which is thought to be from 50,000 years to 2 million years old. So, unlike speech, the brain did not evolve to read naturally. As a result, the brain adapts to the challenge of reading. The process of reading involves most of the brain, especially an interconnection between visual areas and language areas; but also neural systems related to action, emotion, decision-making, and memory.

The science of reading (SoR) is the discipline that studies the objective investigation and accumulation of reliable evidence about how humans learn to read and how reading should be taught. It draws on many fields, including cognitive science, developmental psychology, education, educational psychology, special education, and more.

This article is mainly about the teaching of reading in the United States.

Foundational skills such as phonics, decoding, and phonemic awareness are considered to be important parts of the science of reading, but they are not the only ingredients. SoR also includes areas such as oral reading fluency, vocabulary, morphology, reading comprehension, and more.

In addition, some educators feel that SoR should include digital literacy; background knowledge; content-rich instruction; infrastructure such as curriculum; adaptive teaching; bi-literacy development; and, social justice.

Some researchers suggest there is a need for more studies on the relationship between theory and practice. They say "We know more about the science of reading than about the science of teaching based on the science of reading", and "there are many layers between basic science findings and teacher implementation that must be traversed". Furthermore, the determination of policy or practice should "depend on studies that directly evaluate the effectiveness of a practice or policy" using empirical evidence, rather than basic research alone.

Research in cognitive science and neuroscience has made significant progress in reading. Yet, one researcher asks "if the science is so advanced, why do so many people read so poorly?".

Regarding reading levels, in the United States, the 2019 Nation's Report Card reported that 34% of grade-four public school students performed at or above the NAEP proficient level and 65% performed at or above the basic level. As reported in the PIRLS study, the United States ranked 15th out of 50 countries, for reading comprehension levels of fourth-graders. In addition, according to the 2011–2018 PIAAC study, out of 39 countries the United States ranked 19th for literacy levels of adults 16 to 65; and 16.9% of adults in the United States read at or below level one.

As to why reading levels are low, neuroscientist Mark Seidenberg suggests it may be the result of three factors:

1. the English language has a deep alphabetic orthography
2. linguistic variability contributes to the "Black-White achievement gap"
3. how reading is taught.

With respect to #3, many researchers point to three areas:

- Contemporary reading science has had very little impact on educational practice—mainly because of a "two-cultures problem separating science and education".
- Teaching practices in the 2000s and 2010s rest on outdated assumptions that make learning to read harder than it needs to be.
- Connecting evidence-based practice to educational practice would be beneficial, but is extremely difficult to achieve due to a lack of adequate training of many teachers in the cognitive science relating to reading.

== Foundational skills instruction in the United States ==
Foundational reading skills are those generally taught from kindergarten through grade 3. However, 30% or more of US students, up to grade 12, failed to perform at or above the basic reading level of the Nations Report Card (e.g., grade 4: 37% in 2022; grade 8: 30% in 2022; and grade 12: 30% in 2019). As a result, many secondary school teachers devote some class time to activities related to foundational reading skills.

The following chart shows the percentage of K-12 English language arts teachers who engaged in foundational reading activities with students.

Activities / Grades	K–1	2–5	6–8	9–12
Print concepts	73%	56%	35%	40%
Phonological awareness	85%	59%	29%	22%
Phonics	92%	61%	25%	22%
Fluency	80%	65%	36%	36%

Secondary ELA teachers in states with reading legislation were significantly more likely to report frequently engaging their students in these activities than secondary ELA teachers in states without such legislation, even though only one-quarter of states with these laws include requirements around secondary ELA instruction.

=== Suggested reading instruction by grade level ===
Some education researchers suggest the teaching of the various reading components by specific grade levels. The following is one example from Carol Tolman, Ed.D. and Louisa Moats, Ed.D. that corresponds in many respects with the United States Common Core State Standards Initiative.

Reading instruction component	Tolman & Moats	US Common Core
Phonological awareness	K–1	K–1
Basic phonics	K–1	K–1
Vocabulary	K–6+	K–6+
Comprehension	K–6+	K–6+
Written expression	1–6+	K–6+
Fluency	1–3	1–5
Advanced phonics/decoding	2–6+	2–5

=== Oral language skills ===
Spoken language is the foundation of learning to read (long before children see any letters) and children's knowledge of the phonological structure of language is a good predictor of early reading ability. Spoken language is dominant for most of childhood; however, reading ultimately catches up and surpasses speech.

=== Phonological awareness and phonemic awareness ===
Phonological awareness relates to oral language. It involves the detection and manipulation of sounds at three levels of sound structure: (1) syllables, (2) onsets and rimes, and (3) phonemes.

Phonemic awareness (PA) is a sub-set of Phonological awareness. It is the process by which the phonemes (sounds of oral language) are heard, interpreted, understood and manipulated – unrelated to their grapheme (written language). The National Reading Panel (NRP) concluded that phonemic awareness is a means rather than an end. Its value is in helping learners understand and use the alphabetic system to read and write. This is why it is important to include letters when teaching children to manipulate phonemes. When teaching phonemic awareness, the NRP found that better results were obtained with focused and explicit instruction of one or two elements, over five or more hours, in small groups, and using the corresponding graphemes (letters). See also Speech perception. In one instance, a 2014 program of advanced phonemic awareness training (without using the corresponding letters) improved the PA but not the word reading. Some research has concluded that "reading outcomes are stronger when phonemic awareness is taught with print", and as mentioned earlier, the most effective way of teaching phonemic awareness is through segmenting and blending, a key part of synthetic phonics.

=== Systematic phonics ===
To use phonics is to teach the relationship between the sounds of the spoken language (phonemes), and the letters (graphemes) or groups of letters or syllables of the written language. Phonics is also known as the sound-symbol association, decoding words, and the alphabetic principle or the alphabetic code.

Systematic phonics is not one specific method of teaching phonics; it is a term used to describe phonics approaches that are taught explicitly and in a structured, systematic manner. They are systematic because the letters and the sounds they relate to are taught in a specific sequence, as opposed to incidentally or on a "when needed" basis. The National Reading Panel (NRP) in the U.S. concluded that systematic phonics instruction is more effective than unsystematic phonics or non-phonics instruction. Systematic phonics is also supported by Teaching Reading, National Inquiry into the Teaching of Literacy and the Independent review of the teaching of early reading (Rose Report 2006).

=== Vocabulary, sight vocabulary, and sight words ===
An important aspect of reading comprehension is vocabulary development. When a reader encounters an unfamiliar word in print and decodes it to derive its spoken pronunciation, the reader understands the word if it is in the reader's spoken vocabulary. Otherwise, the reader must derive the meaning of the word using another strategy, such as context. If the development of the child's vocabulary is impeded by factors such as ear infections that prevent the child from consistently hearing new words, then the development of reading will also be impaired.

Sight words (i.e. high-frequency words), sometimes called the look-say or whole-word method, are not a part of the phonics method. They are usually associated with whole language and balanced literacy where students are expected to memorize high-frequency words such as those on the Dolch word list and the Fry word list (e.g. a, be, call, do, eat, fall, gave, etc.). The supposition (in whole language and balanced literacy) is that students will learn to read more easily if they memorize the most common words they will encounter, especially words that are not easily decoded (i.e. exceptions).

On the other hand, using sight words as a method of teaching reading in English is seen as being at odds with the alphabetic principle and treating English as though it was a logographic language (e.g. Chinese or Japanese).

In addition, according to research, whole-word memorization is "labor-intensive", requiring on average about 35 trials per word. Also, phonics advocates say that most words are decodable, so comparatively few words have to be memorized. And because a child will over time encounter many low-frequency words, "the phonological recoding mechanism is a very powerful, indeed essential, mechanism throughout reading development". Furthermore, researchers suggest that teachers who withhold phonics instruction to make it easier on children "are having the opposite effect" by making it harder for children to gain basic word-recognition skills. They suggest that learners should focus on understanding the principles of phonics so they can recognize the phonemic overlaps among words (e.g. have, had, has, having, haven't, etc.), making it easier to decode them all.

Sight vocabulary is a part of the phonics method. It describes words that are stored in long-term memory and read automatically. Skilled fully-alphabetic readers learn to store words in long-term memory without memorization (i.e. a mental dictionary), making reading and comprehension easier. "Once you know the sound-based way to decode, your mind learns what words look like, even if you're not especially trying to do so". The process, called orthographic mapping, involves decoding, crosschecking, mental marking and rereading. It takes significantly less time than memorization. This process works for fully-alphabetic readers when reading simple decodable words from left to right through the word. Irregular words pose more of a challenge, yet research in 2018 concluded that "fully-alphabetic students" learn irregular words more easily when they use a process called hierarchical decoding. In this process, students, rather than decode from left to right, are taught to focus attention on the irregular elements such as a vowel-digraph and a silent-e; for example, break (b – r – ea – k), height (h – eigh – t), touch (t – ou – ch), and make (m – a – ke). Consequentially, they suggest that teachers and tutors should focus on "teaching decoding with more advanced vowel patterns before expecting young readers to tackle irregular words". Others recommend including high-frequency words (i.e. Fry word list) while teaching the "sound-symbol relations" (i.e. phonics).

=== Fluency ===
Fluency is the ability to read orally with speed, accuracy, and vocal expression. The ability to read fluently is one of several critical factors necessary for reading comprehension. If a reader is not fluent, it may be difficult to remember what has been read and to relate the ideas expressed in the text to their background knowledge. This accuracy and automaticity of reading serves as a bridge between decoding and comprehension.

To provide a reliable estimate of fluency, some studies look at speed and accuracy (i.e., the number of words students can read correctly per minute).

One way to improve fluency is rereading (the student rereads a passage aloud several times with vocal expression). Another is assisted reading (the student visually reads a text while simultaneously hearing someone else fluently read the same text).

=== Spelling ===
Evidence supports the strong synergy between reading (decoding) and spelling (encoding), especially for children in kindergarten or grade one and elementary school students at risk for literacy difficulties. Students receiving encoding instruction and guided practice that included using (a) manipulatives such as letter tiles to learn phoneme-grapheme relationships and words and (b) writing phoneme-grapheme relationships and words made from these correspondences significantly outperformed contrast groups not receiving encoding instruction.

According to a 2025 meta-analysis of spelling interventions for students with or at-risk for learning disabilities, among the various methods of teaching spelling only those with "phonemic approaches to spelling intervention" had a positive effect on word-reading.

=== Reading comprehension ===
The NRP describes reading comprehension as a complex cognitive process in which a reader intentionally and interactively engages with the text.

A US study published in 2024 found that English/language arts teachers across grades K-12 on average devote 23% of reading/language arts instruction to reading comprehension, however they are not regularly using research-based practices when helping students to understand text.

The science of reading says that reading comprehension is heavily dependent on word recognition (i.e., phonological awareness, decoding, etc.) and oral language comprehension (i.e., background knowledge, vocabulary, etc.). Phonological awareness and rapid naming predict reading comprehension in second grade, but oral language skills account for an additional 13.8% of the variance.

It has also been found that sustained content literacy intervention instruction that gradually builds thematic connections may help young children transfer their knowledge to related topics, leading to improved comprehension.

The American educator Eric "E. D." Donald Hirsch Jr. suggests that students need to learn about something in order to read well. This is supported by the socalled "baseball study" which concluded that "results delineate the powerful effect of prior knowledge". However, some researchers say reading comprehension instruction has become "content agnostic", focused on skill practice (such as "finding the main idea"), to the detriment of learning about science, history, and other disciplines. Instead, they say teachers should find ways to integrate content knowledge with reading and writing instruction. One approach is to merge the two – to embed literacy instruction into social studies and science. Another approach is to build content knowledge into reading classes, often called "high-quality or "content-rich" curricula. However, according to Natalie Wexler, in her book The Knowledge Gap, "making the shift to knowledge is as much about changing teachers' beliefs and daily practice as about changing the materials they're supposed to use".

Researcher and educator Timothy Shanahan believes the most effective way to improve reading comprehension skills is to teach students to summarize, develop an understanding of text structure, and paraphrase.

== Simple view of reading ==
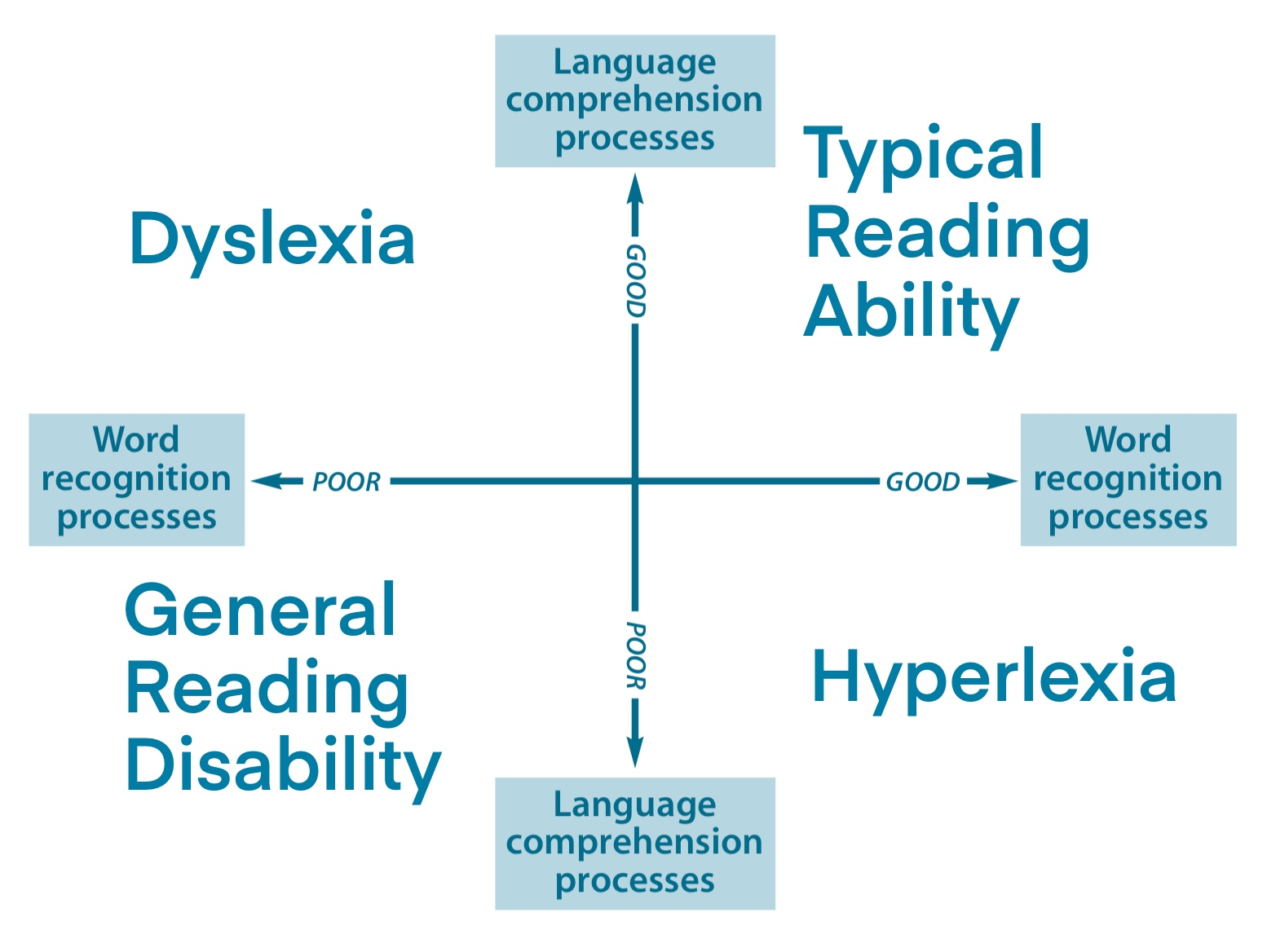
The Simple View of Reading proposes four broad categories of developing readers: typical readers; poor readers; dyslexics; and hyperlexics.

The simple view of reading is a scientific theory about reading comprehension. According to the theory, to comprehend what they are reading students need both decoding skills and oral language (listening) comprehension ability. Neither is enough on their own. In other words, they need the ability to recognize and process (e.g., sound out) the text, and the ability to understand the language in which the text is written (i.e., vocabulary, grammar, and background knowledge). Students are not reading if they can decode words but do not understand their meaning. Similarly, students are not reading if they cannot decode words that they would ordinarily recognize and understand if they heard them spoken out loud.

It is expressed in this equation:

Decoding × Oral Language Comprehension = Reading Comprehension.

As shown in the graphic, the Simple View of Reading proposes four broad categories of developing readers: typical readers; poor readers (general reading disability); dyslexics; and hyperlexics.

== Scarborough's Reading Rope ==
Hollis Scarborough, the creator of the Reading Rope and senior scientist at Haskins Laboratories, is a leading researcher of early language development and its connection to later literacy.

Scarborough published the Reading Rope infographics in 2001 using strands of rope to illustrate the many ingredients that are involved in becoming a skilled reader. The upper strands represent language comprehension and reinforce one another. The lower strands represent word recognition and work together as the reader becomes accurate, fluent, and automatic through practice. The upper and lower strands all weave together to produce a skilled reader.

Language-comprehension (Upper strands)
Background knowledge (facts, concepts, etc.)
Vocabulary (breadth, precision, links, etc.)
Language structures (syntax, semantics, etc.)
Verbal reasoning (inference, metaphor, etc.)
Literacy knowledge (print concepts, genres, etc.)
Word-recognition (Lower strands)
Phonological awareness (syllables, phonemes, etc.)
Decoding (alphabetic principle, spelling-sound correspondence)
Sight recognition (of familiar words)

More recent research by Laurie E. Cutting and Hollis S. Scarborough has highlighted the importance of executive function processes (e.g. working memory, planning, organization, self-monitoring, and similar abilities) to reading comprehension. Easy texts do not require many executive functions; however, more difficult text requires more "focus on the ideas". Reading comprehension strategies, such as summarizing, may help.

== Active view of reading model ==
The active view of reading (AVR) model by Nell K. Duke and Kelly B. Cartwright (May 7, 2021) offers an alternative to the simple view of reading (SVR), and a proposed update to Scarborough's reading rope (SRR). It reflects key insights from scientific research on reading that are not captured in the SVR and SRR. Although the AVR model has not been tested as a whole in research, "each element within the model has been tested in instructional research demonstrating positive, causal influences on reading comprehension". This model is more complete than the simple view of reading and does a better job of accommodating some of the knowledge about reading developed over the past several decades. However, it does not explain how these variables fit together, how their relative importance changes with development, or many other issues relevant to reading instruction.

The model lists contributors to reading (and potential causes of reading difficulty) within, across, and beyond word recognition and language comprehension; including the elements of self-regulation. This feature of the model reflects the research documenting that not all profiles of reading difficulty are explained by low word recognition and/or low language comprehension. A second feature of the model is that it shows how word recognition and language comprehension overlap, and identifies processes that "bridge" these constructs.

The following chart shows the ingredients in the authors' infographic. In addition, the authors point out that reading is also impacted by text, task, and sociocultural context.

Active Self Regulation
Motivation and engagement
Executive function skills
Strategy use (related to word recognition, comprehension, vocabulary, etc.)
Word recognition (WR)
Phonological awareness (syllables, phonemes, etc.)
Alphabetic principle
Phonics knowledge
Decoding skills
Recognition of words at sight
Bridging processes (the overlapping of WR and LC)
Print concepts
Reading fluency
Vocabulary knowledge
Morphological awareness (the structure of words and parts of words such as stems, root words, prefixes, and suffixes)
Graphophonological-semantic cognitive flexibility (letter-sound-meaning flexibility)
Language comprehension (LC)
Cultural and other content knowledge
Reading-specific background knowledge (genre, text, etc.)
Verbal reasoning (inference, metaphor, etc.)
Language structure (syntax, semantics, etc.)
Theory of mind (the ability to attribute mental states to ourselves and others)

== Automaticity ==
In the field of psychology, automaticity is the ability to do things without occupying the mind with the low-level details required, allowing it to become an automatic response pattern or a habit. When reading is automatic, precious working memory resources can be devoted to considering the meaning of a text, etc.

The unexpected finding from cognitive science is that practice does not make perfect. For a new skill to become automatic, sustained practice beyond the point of mastery is necessary.

== How the brain reads ==
Several researchers and neuroscientists have attempted to explain how the brain reads.

Neuroscientist Stanislas Dehaene says that a few simple truths should be accepted by all, namely: a) all children have similar brains, are well tuned to systematic grapheme-phoneme correspondences, "and have everything to gain from phonics – the only method that will give them the freedom to read any text", b) classroom size is largely irrelevant if the proper teaching methods are used, c) it is essential to have standardized screening tests for dyslexia, followed by appropriate specialized training, and d) while decoding is essential, vocabulary enrichment is equally important.

A study conducted at the Medical University of South Carolina (MUSC) in 2022 indicates that "greater left-brain asymmetry can predict both better and average performance on a foundational level of reading ability, depending on whether the analysis is conducted over the whole brain or in specific regions". There have been correlations between specific brain regions in the left hemisphere of the cerebral cortex during different reading activities.

Although it is not included in most meta-analytical studies, the sensorimotor cortex of the brain is the most active region of the brain during reading. This is often disregarded because it is associated solely with movement; However, a 2014 fMRI study involving adults and children participants, where bodily movement was restricted, demonstrated strong evidence revealing that this region may be correlated with automatic word processing and decoding. The results of this study found this portion of the brain to be highly active in persons who were learning/struggling to read (children, those diagnosed with dyslexia, and those new to the English language) and less active in fluent adult readers.

The occipital and parietal lobes, or more specifically fusiform gyrus, include the brain's visual word form area (VWFA). The VWFA is believed to be responsible for the brain's ability to read visually. This area of the brain tends to be activated when words are presented orthographically, as found in a study in 2002 where participants were presented with word and non-word stimuli. During presentation of word stimuli, this portion of the brain was extremely active; however, during presentation of stimuli that did not involve graphemes the brain was less active. Participants with dyslexia remained outliers, with this area of the brain being consistently underactive in both scenarios.

The two major regions of the brain associated with phonological skills are the temporal-parietal region and the Perisylvian Region. In an fMRI study conducted in 2001, participants were presented with written words, verbal frequency words, and verbal pseudo-words. The dorsal (upper) portion of the temporal-parietal region was the most active during the pseudo-words and the ventral (lower) portion was more active during frequency words, except subjects diagnosed with dyslexia, who showed no impairment to their ventral region but under-activation in the dorsal portion.

The perisylvian region, which is the portion of the brain believed to connect Broca's and Wernicke's area, is another region that is highly active during phonological activities where participants are asked to verbalize known and unknown words. Damage to this portion of this brain directly affects a person's ability to speak cohesively and with sense; furthermore, this portion of the brain activity remains consistent for both dyslexic and non-dyslexic readers.

The inferior frontal region is a much more complex region of the brain, and its association with reading is not necessarily linear, for it is active in several reading-related activities. Several studies have recorded its activity in association with comprehension and processing skills, as well as spelling and working memory. Although the exact role of this portion of the brain is still debatable, several studies indicate that this area of the brain tends to be more active in readers who have been diagnosed with dyslexia and less active when treatment is successfully undergone.

In addition to regions on the cortex, which is considered gray matter on fMRI's, there are several white matter fasciculus that are also active during different reading activities. These three regions are what connect the three respected cortex regions as the brain reads, thus are responsible for the brain's cross-model integration involved in reading. Three connective fasciculus that are prominently active during reading are the following: the left arcuate faciculus, the left inferior longitudinal faciculus, and the superior longitudinal fasciculus. All three areas are found to be weaker in readers diagnosed with dyslexia.

The cerebellum, which is not a part of the cerebral cortex, is also believed to play an important role in reading. When the cerebellum is impaired, victims struggle with many executive functioning and organizational skills both inside and outside of their reading ability. In a synthetic fMRI study, specific activities that displayed significant cerebellum involvement included automation, word accuracy, and reading speed.

== Eye movement and silent reading rate ==
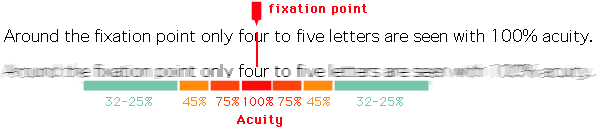
×Eye fixation point

Reading is an intensive process in which the eye quickly moves to assimilate the text – seeing just accurately enough to interpret groups of symbols. It is necessary to understand visual perception and eye movement in reading to understand the reading process.

When reading, the eye moves continuously along a line of text but makes short rapid movements (saccades) intermingled with short stops (fixations). There is considerable variability in fixations (the point at which a saccade jumps to) and saccades between readers, and even for the same person reading a single passage of text. When reading, the eye has a perceptual span of about 20 slots. In the best-case scenario and reading English, when the eye is fixated on a letter, four to five letters to the right and three to four letters to the left can be clearly identified. Beyond that, only the general shape of some letters can be identified.

The eye movements of deaf readers differ from those of readers who can hear, and skilled deaf readers have been shown to have shorter fixations and fewer refixations when reading.

Research published in 2019 concluded that the silent reading rate of adults in English for non-fiction is in the range of 175 to 300 words per minute (wpm), and for fiction the range is 200 to 320 words per minute.

== Dual-route hypothesis to reading aloud ==
In the early 1970s, the dual-route hypothesis to reading aloud was proposed, according to which there are two separate mental mechanisms involved in reading aloud, with output from both contributing to the pronunciation of written words. One mechanism is the lexical route whereby skilled readers can recognize a word as part of their sight vocabulary. The other is the nonlexical or sublexical route, in which the reader "sounds out" (decodes) written words.

== The production effect (reading out loud) ==
There is robust evidence that saying a word out loud makes it more memorable than simply reading it silently or hearing someone else say it. This is because self-reference and self-control over speaking produce more engagement with the words. The memory benefit of "hearing oneself" is referred to as the production effect. This has implications for students such as those who are learning to read. The results of studies imply that oral production is beneficial because it entails two distinctive components: speaking (a motor act) and hearing oneself (the self-referential auditory input). It is also thought that the "optimal benefit would probably come from reading aloud from notes that the student took at the time of initial exposure to new information".

== Multisensory learning ==
Multisensory learning is the assumption that individuals learn better if they are taught using more than one sense (modality). The senses usually employed in multisensory learning are visual, auditory, kinesthetic, and tactile – VAKT (i.e. seeing, hearing, doing, and touching). Other senses might include smell, taste and balance (e.g. making vegetable soup or riding a bicycle).

Multisensory learning is different from learning styles which is the assumption that people can be classified according to their learning style (audio, visual or kinesthetic). However, critics of learning styles say there is no consistent evidence that identifying an individual student's learning style and teaching for that style will produce better outcomes. Consequently, learning styles has not received widespread support from scientists, nor has it proven to be effective in the classroom. (Note: Sources:) (For more on this see learning styles.)

According to the U.K. Independent review of the teaching of early reading (Rose Report 2006) multisensory learning is effective because it keeps students more engaged in their learning, however, it does not recommend a specific type of multisensory learning activity. In 2010 the U.K. Department for Education established the core criteria for programs that teach school children to read by using systematic Synthetic phonics. It includes a requirement that the material "uses a multi-sensory approach so that children learn variously from simultaneous visual, auditory and kinaesthetic activities which are designed to secure essential phonic knowledge and skills". There are other studies that support activity-based learning because it improves focus and memory retention.

A 2022 meta-analysis of studies related to the use of multi-sensory learning to teach children with or at risk for dyslexia does not suggest that multi-sensory instruction is more effective. Instead, it supports the use of limited and precious time on the key ingredient – instruction that is explicit and systematic.

== Explicit instruction vs. implicit instruction ==
Explicit instruction is beneficial for all early literacy learners, especially those with reading disabilities such as dyslexia. (Note: Sources:) Beyond that, professor Mark Seidenberg, suggests that teachers strike a balance between implicit instruction and explicit instruction, with explicit instruction for all students at the start, followed by implicit instruction for all students except dyslexics (who continue to receive explicit instruction as required).

== Evidence-based reading instruction ==
Evidence-based reading instruction refers to practices having research evidence showing their success in improving reading achievement. It is related to evidence-based education.

As of October 9, 2025, 40 US states and the District of Columbia "have passed laws or implemented new policies related to evidence-based reading instruction since 2013".

Several organizations report on research about reading instruction, for example:

- Best Evidence Encyclopedia (BEE) is a free website created by the Johns Hopkins University School of Education's Center for Data-Driven Reform in Education and is funded by the Institute of Education Sciences, U.S. Department of Education. In 2021, BEE released a review of research on 51 different programs for struggling readers in elementary schools. Many of the programs used phonics-based teaching and/or one or more other approaches. The conclusions of this report are shown in the section entitled Effectiveness of programs.
- Evidence for ESSA began in 2017 and is produced by the Center for Research and Reform in Education (CRRE) at Johns Hopkins University School of Education, Baltimore, MD. It offers free up-to-date information on current PK–12 programs in reading, math, social-emotional learning, and attendance that meet the standards of the Every Student Succeeds Act (ESSA) (the United States K–12 public education policy signed by President Obama in 2015).
- ProvenTutoring.org is a non-profit organization, a separate subsidiary of the non-profit Success for All. It is a resource for school systems and educators interested in research-proven tutoring programs. It lists programs that deliver tutoring programs that are proven effective in rigorous research as defined in the 2015 Every Student Succeeds Act. The Center for Research and Reform in Education at Johns Hopkins University provides the technical support to inform program selection.
- What Works Clearinghouse (WWC) of Washington, DC, was established in 2002 and evaluates numerous educational programs in twelve categories by the quality and quantity of the evidence and the effectiveness. It is operated by the federal National Center for Education Evaluation and Regional Assistance (NCEE), part of the Institute of Education Sciences (IES) Individual studies are available that have been reviewed by WWC and categorized according to the evidence tiers of the United States Every student succeeds act (ESSA).
- Intervention reports are provided for programs according to twelve topics (e.g. literacy, mathematics, science, behavior, etc.).
- The British Educational Research Association (BERA) claims to be the home of educational research in the United Kingdom.
- The Florida Center for Reading Research is a research center at Florida State University that explores all aspects of reading research. Its Resource Database allows you to search for information based on a variety of criteria.
- The Institute of Education Sciences (IES), Washington, D.C., is the statistics, research, and evaluation arm of the U.S. Department of Education. It funds independent education research, evaluation and statistics. It published a Synthesis of its Research on Early Intervention and Early Childhood Education in 2013. Its publications and products can be searched by author, subject, etc.
- The National Foundation for Educational Research (NFER) is a non-profit research and development organization based in Berkshire, England. It produces independent research and reports about issues across the education system, such as Using Evidence in the Classroom: What Works and Why.
- Office for Standards in Education (Ofsted), in England, conducts research on schools, early education, social care, further education and skills.
- The Ministry of Education, Ontario, Canada offers a site entitled What Works? Research Into Practice. It is a collection of research summaries of promising teaching practice written by experts at Ontario universities.
- The RAND Corporation, with offices throughout the world, funds research on early childhood, K–12, and higher education.
- ResearchED, a U.K. based non-profit, has since 2013 organized education conferences around the world (e.g. Africa, Australia, Asia, Canada, the E.U., the Middle East, New Zealand, the U.K. and the U.S.) featuring researchers and educators, to "promote collaboration between research-users and research-creators". It has been described as a "grass-roots teacher-led project that aims to make teachers research-literate and pseudo-science proof".

== Reading from paper vs. screens ==
A systematic review and meta‐analysis was conducted on the advantages of reading from paper vs. screens. It found no difference in reading times; however, reading from paper has a small advantage in reading performance and metacognition. Other studies conclude that many children understand more from reading books vs. screens.

== Handwriting vs. typing practice in letter and word learning ==
In May 2025, the Journal of Experimental Child Psychology published the results of a study that compared how well children learn letters and words by handwriting verses typing. The study concluded that children in the handwriting groups achieved more accuracy than those in the typing groups, suggesting that typing should complement but not replace handwriting. Research published in 2024 found that handwriting tends to activate broader brain networks than typing. The study authors argue that handwriting provides a more optimal condition for learning.

== Teaching reading and writing together ==
There is evidence that literacy programs that balance both reading and writing instruction can strengthen both. A 2017 meta-analysis of experimental intervention studies with preschool through high school students concluded that statistically significant positive effects resulted when reading and writing were taught together.

== Computer-based early reading program ==
One study on the use of computer-based reading instruction in a balanced literacy kindergarten program showed improved outcomes in phonological blending, word reading, reading comprehension, and book-reading levels.

== Belief in neuromyths among primary school teachers ==
A study involving 1257 primary school teachers in 11 countries found that "13 out of 21 neuromyths are prevalent in all of the countries that were surveyed". For example, over 90% of the participants agreed with the theories of multiple intelligences and learning styles despite the fact that these theories lack empirical support. Other common neuromyths include brain hemispheres, environmental stimulation, and coordination exercises. The study highlighted the need for teacher education programs that include evidence-based neuroscience and cognitive psychology.

== Teacher training and legislation ==
A 2021 study found that most U.S. states do not measure teachers' knowledge of the 'science of reading'. In addition, according to one study, as few as 2% of school districts use reading programs that follow the science of reading. Mark Seidenberg, a neuroscientist, states that, with few exceptions, teachers are not taught the cognitive science behind reading and "don't know what they don't know".

A survey in the United States reported that 70% of teachers believe in a balanced literacy approach to teaching reading – however, balanced literacy "is not systematic, explicit instruction". Teacher, researcher, and author, Louisa Moats, in a video about teachers and science of reading, says that sometimes when teachers talk about their "philosophy" of teaching reading, she responds by saying, "But your 'philosophy' doesn't work". She says this is evidenced by the fact that so many children are struggling with reading. On another occasion, when asked about the most common questions teachers ask her, she replied, "over and over" they ask "why didn't anyone teach me this before?". In an Education Week Research Center survey of more than 530 professors of reading instruction, only 22 percent said their philosophy of teaching early reading centered on explicit, systematic phonics with comprehension as a separate focus.

As of October 2024, after Mississippi became the only state to improve reading results between 2017 and 2019, 40 U.S. states and the District of Columbia have since passed laws or implemented new policies related to evidence-based reading instruction. These requirements relate to six areas: teacher preparation; teacher certification or license renewal; professional development or coaching; assessment; material; and instruction or intervention. As a result, many schools are moving away from balanced literacy programs that encourage students to guess a word, and are introducing phonics where they learn to "decode" (sound out) words. However, the adoption of these new requirements are by no means uniform.

For example, only ten states have requirements in all six areas, and six have requirements in only one or two areas. Only twenty states have requirements related to pre-service teacher certification or license renewal. Thirty-eight states have requirements for professional development or coaching, and thirty-two require teachers to use specific instructional methods or interventions for struggling readers. Furthermore, fourteen states do not allow or require 3rd-grade retention for students who are behind in reading. Experts say it is uncertain whether these new initiatives will lead to real improvements in children's reading results because old practices prove hard to shake.

In January 2024, New York Governor Hochul introduced the Back to Basics Reading Plan requiring that by September 2025, all curriculum, instructional strategies, and teacher professional development align with all elements of evidence-based reading instruction. In July 2025, the Science of Reading Center at the State University of New York conducted a survey to determine its progress. It found that 69% had adopted or were piloting a SoR curriculum, but only 28% considered it their primary approach. In addition, only 8% of the educators said their training "significantly included" SoR. The result is that educators are "mixing and matching new approaches with the curricula and teaching strategies they've always used".

As more state legislatures seek to pass science of reading legislation, some teachers' unions are mounting opposition, citing concerns about mandates that would limit teachers' professional autonomy in the classroom, uneven implementation, unreasonable timelines, and the amount of time and compensation teachers receive for additional training. Some teachers' unions, in particular, have protested attempts to ban the three-cueing system that encourages students to guess at the pronunciation of words, using pictures, etc. (rather than to decode them). In April 2024, the California Teachers Union was successful in stopping a bill that would have required teachers to use the science of reading.

Arkansas required every elementary and special education teacher to be proficient in the scientific research on reading by 2021; causing Amy Murdoch, an associate professor and the director of the reading science program at Mount St. Joseph University in Cincinnati to say "We still have a long way to go – but I do see some hope".

In 2021, the Department of Education and Early Childhood Development of New Brunswick appears to be the first in Canada to revise its K-2 reading curriculum based on "research-based instructional practice". For example, it replaced the various cueing systems with "mastery in the consolidated alphabetic to skilled reader phase". Although one document on the site, dated 1998, contains references to such practices as using "cueing systems" which is at odds with the department's current shift to using evidence-based practices. The Minister of Education in Ontario, Canada followed by stating plans to revise the elementary language curriculum and the Grade 9 English course with "scientific, evidence-based approaches that emphasize direct, explicit and systematic instruction and removing references to unscientific discovery and inquiry-based learning, including the three-cueing system, by 2023."

Some non-profit organizations, such as the Center for Development and Learning (Louisiana) and the Reading League (New York State), offer training programs for teachers to learn about the science of reading. ResearchED, a U.K. based non-profit since 2013 has organized education conferences around the world featuring researchers and educators to promote collaboration between research-users and research-creators.

Researcher and educator Timothy Shanahan acknowledges that comprehensive research does not always exist for specific aspects of reading instruction. However, "the lack of evidence doesn't mean something doesn't work, only that we don't know". He suggests that teachers make use of the research that is available in such places as Journal of Educational Psychology, Reading Research Quarterly, Reading & Writing Quarterly, Review of Educational Research, and Scientific Studies of Reading. If a practice lacks supporting evidence, it can be used with the understanding that it is based upon a claim, not science.

Some educators advocate for better ways to teach our teachers about the "structure of language" and for more consistent ways to describe literacy tools to reduce confusion and save time.

== Criticism ==
Some educators/researchers suggest that the claims of SoR should be more closely scrutinized before they are readily accepted. For example, two such educators/researchers, in a book entitled Fact-Checking the Science of Reading: Opening up the Conversation, "explore the validity of claims associated with the Science of Reading as they have appeared in social media, the popular press, and academic works".

=== Politicalization ===
The adoptions of these curricula have been happening since the 1990s as literacy rates have continued to drop. Ohio instituted a SoR informed curriculum mandate and have seen improvements compared to 2025 but are still worse than the 2024 scores. The failures are largely blamed on teachers "not embracing" the curriculum or using multiple curriculums for different learners, but it seems to suggest a difference between "science" and successful application. This has created a sense of zeal around adopting the methods suggested. Science of reading researcher Dr. Catherine Snow said in an interview, "the science of reading has become something more like a religious commitment than anything that you would call a science." Professor Rachael Gabriel, also criticized the politicalization of the issue, "The mandates contained in science of reading legislation are not scientific. Policies about literacy instruction that are branded as scientific become difficult to push back on, even as they are minimizing, restricting, and stripping decision-making from educators rather than ensuring children learn to read."

Professor Denny Taylor, who researched the effects of trauma on literacy, has started a conspiratorial Substack seeking to reveal a Conservative, anti-public education, motivation behind the political actions attached to the SoR.

=== Funding ===
The Science behind "Science of reading" based curriculum tends to self-fund research on the curriculum's effectiveness. Curriculum developers often share donors or owners with funding for university research-making it hard to tell if the research is coming from a gap of knowledge or a desire to sell a product.

Curriculum like i-Ready by the Curriculum associates are backed by private equity. They are filling the desire for Science of Reading Curriculum to profit off of public-school funding while also funding University research in Iowa. Dr. Elena Aydarova offers suspicion around companies "cashing in" on SoR. "They're just like SOR, and that's the science quote unquote, that pertains to businesses, corporations, and EdTech companies that are leading this movement. But they're doing this to primarily bolster their profits."

=== Application ===
Science of Reading proponent Mark Seidenberg has released criticism of SoR saying it needs to be recalibrated. He wrote, " The child can’t learn to read via this mechanism unless they are clued into what there is to learn. That is why inadequate basic skills instruction is so harmful. The SoR has the dial set at the opposite extreme, relying on learning via explicit instruction. That isn’t realistic (given how much there is to learn and how long it takes), it isn’t necessary (given the existence of implicit learning), and the opportunity costs are unacceptably high. With so much instruction about components of reading there is little time left for reading." His position has been supported by other researchers.

In 2024, New York Governor Kathy Hochul, instituted the "Back to Basics Reading Plan," and the New York City required one of three evidence-based science of reading curriculums be used in their NYC Reads plan. New York city school teacher Nicole Radosti Pipia's class is using a web-based curriculum off of this list (perhaps i-Ready). She says they often "skip through it" and they she no longer has time to teach novels. “We’re told that we cannot deviate from the program, and if you have to do the program, there’s literally no time.” After NYC's adoption, reading scores increased slightly, only to drop to below the overhaul—in 2026.

Supporters of the SoR suggest that room be made for healthy skepticism. They say that teachers and principals need to be skeptical about expert claims – especially claims made without evidence – and demand sound evidence and credible credentials.

== See also ==
- Reading § Learning to read
- Reading § Teaching reading
