= Linnea Ehri =

American psychologist & scholar

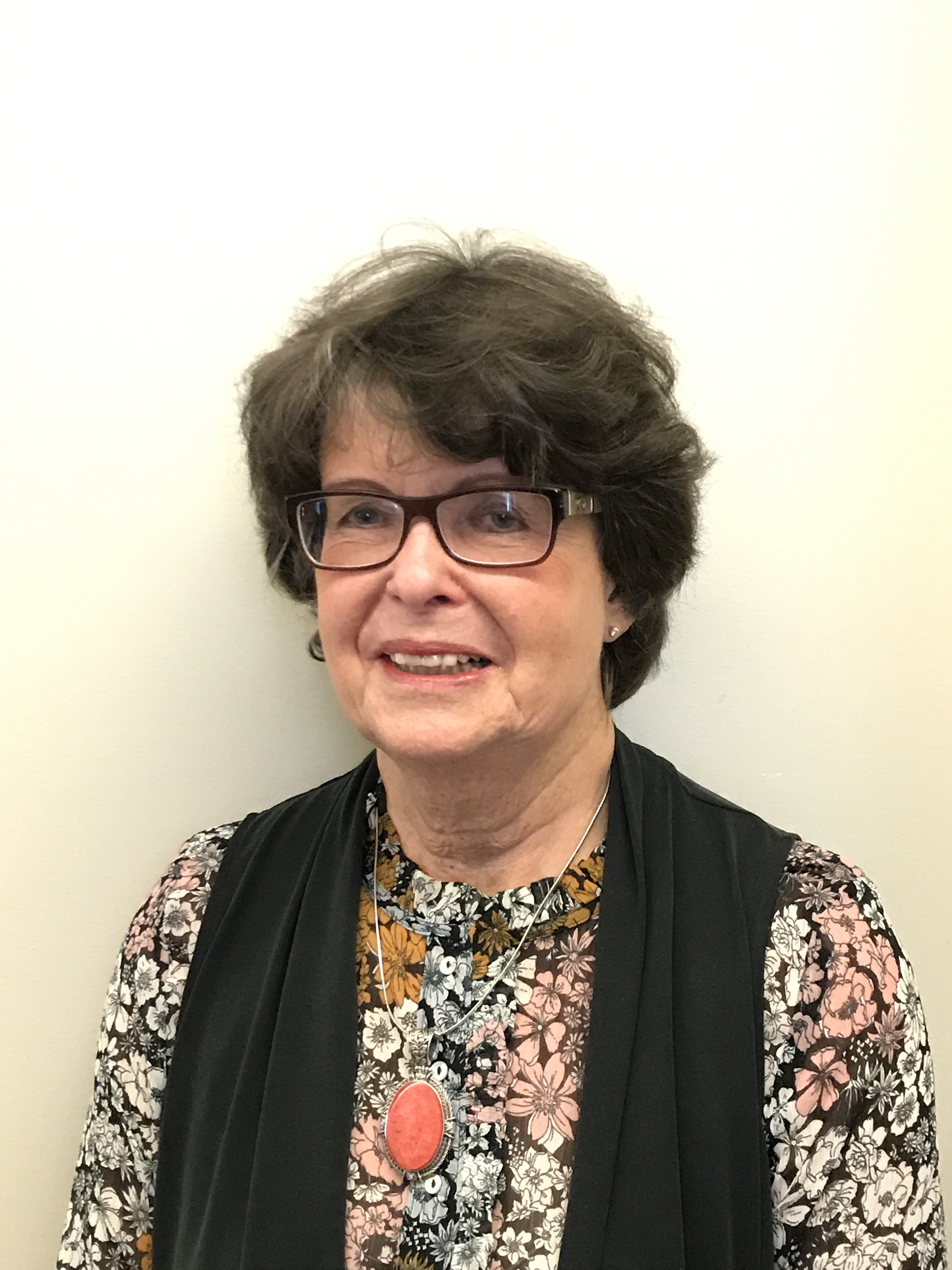
- Education: University of Washington (BS); San Francisco State University (MA); University of California, Berkeley (PhD)
- Awards: (2002) Distinguished Scientist Award, Society for the Scientific Study of Reading; (1998) Sylvia Scribner Research Award, American Educational Research Association; (1998) Reading Hall of Fame, International Reading Association
- Scientific career
- Fields: Educational Psychology
- Workplaces: CUNY Graduate Center

Linnea Carlson Ehri is an American educational psychologist and expert on the development of reading. She is a Distinguished Professor Emerita of Educational Psychology at the Graduate Center of the City University of New York. Ehri is known for her theory of orthographic mapping, which describes the process of forming "letter-sound connections to bond the spellings, pronunciations, and meanings of specific words in memory" that underlies fluent reading. As a consequence of orthographic mapping, written words are tightly linked with their pronunciations and meanings in memory and can be recognized by sight.

Ehri served on the National Reading Panel, commissioned by the U.S. Congress to report on research-based methods of effective reading instruction from 1997 to 2000. As a member of the panel, she chaired the alphabetics subgroup. Using meta-analysis, the group documented the benefits of systematic phonics and phonemic awareness instruction in helping children learn to read.

== Awards ==
- William S. Gray Citation of Merit from the International Literacy Association (2022)
- Fellow of the American Educational Research Association (2008)
- Distinguished Scientist Award from the Society for the Scientific Study of Reading (2002)
- Sylvia Scribner Research Award from American Educational Research Association, Division C (1998)
- Reading Hall of Fame of the International Reading Association (1998)
- Oscar S. Causey Award for Distinguished Research from the National Reading Conference (1991)
- Milton D. Jacobson Award from the International Reading Association (1981)
- Fellow of the American Psychological Association, Division 15 Educational Psychology (1980)

== Biography ==
Ehri received her B.S. in psychology at the University of Washington in 1963; her M.A. in psychology at San Francisco State University in 1966 and her doctorate in Educational Psychology from the University of California, Berkeley in 1970. Ehri was a faculty member of the University of California, Davis School of Education from 1969 to 1991, prior to joining the faculty of the Graduate Center, CUNY as a Distinguished Professor in 1991. Her research on the development of reading and spelling was supported by the National Institute of Child Health and Human Development.

Ehri served on the board of directors of the National Reading Conference from 1994 to 1996. She was President of the Society for the Scientific Study of Reading from 1996 to 1997.

In addition to her theory of orthographic mapping, Ehri is best known for her work describing the four stages of learning to read words, referred to as pre-alphabetic, partial, full, and consolidated alphabetic phases. Over time and with practice, readers are able to read familiar words by accessing them directly from memory––a process Ehri called sight word reading.

Since her retirement in 2018, Ehri has continued advising students and collaborating on research on emerging readers and evidence-based reading instruction.

== Books ==
- Gough, P. B., Ehri, L. C., & Treiman, R. (Eds.). (1992). Reading acquisition. Routledge.
- Metsala, J. L., & Ehri, L. C. (Eds.). (1998). Word recognition in beginning literacy. Erlbaum.

== Representative papers ==
- Ehri, L. C. (1987). Learning to read and spell words. Journal of Reading Behavior, 19(1), pages 5–31.
- Ehri, L. C. (1995). Phases of development in learning to read words by sight. Journal of Research in Reading, 18(2), pages 116–125.
- Ehri, L. C. (2005). Learning to read words: Theory, findings, and issues. Scientific Studies of reading, 9(2), pages 167–188.
- Ehri, L. C. (2014). Orthographic mapping in the acquisition of sight word reading, spelling memory, and vocabulary learning. Scientific Studies of Reading, 18(1), pages 5–21.
- Ehri, L. C. (2020). The science of learning to read words: A case for systematic phonics instruction. Reading Research Quarterly, 55, pages S45-S60.
