= Evidence-based education =

Paradigm of the education field

Evidence-based education (EBE) is the principle that education practices should be based on the best available scientific evidence, with randomised trials as the gold standard of evidence, rather than tradition, personal judgement, or other influences. Evidence-based education is related to evidence-based teaching, evidence-based learning, and school effectiveness research.

The evidence-based education movement has its roots in the larger movement towards evidence-based practices, and has been the subject of considerable debate since the late 1990s. However, research published in 2020 showed that, despite absence of empirical evidence, belief is high amongst educators in teaching techniques such as matching instruction to a few supposed learning styles and the cone of learning.

Research design and evidence

== History ==
The English author and academic David H. Hargreaves presented a lecture in 1996 in which he stated "Teaching is not at present a research-based profession. I have no doubt that if it were it would be more effective and satisfying". He compared the fields of medicine and teaching, saying that physicians are expected to keep up to date on medical research, whereas many teachers may not even be aware of the importance of research to their profession. In order for teaching to become more research-based, he suggested, educational research would require a "radical change" and teachers would have to become more involved in the creation and application of research.

Following that lecture, English policy makers in education tried to bring theory and practice closer together. At the same time, existing education research faced criticism for its quality, reliability, impartiality and accessibility.

In 2000 and 2001 two international, evidence-based, studies were created to analyze and report on the effectiveness of school education throughout the world: the Programme for International Student Assessment (PISA) in 2000 and the Progress in International Reading Literacy Study (PIRLS) in 2001.

Also, around the same time three major evidence-based studies about reading were released highlighting the value of evidence in education: the US National Reading Panel in 2000, the Australian report on Teaching reading in 2005, and the Independent review of the teaching of early reading (Rose Report 2006), England. Approximately a year before the Rose Report, the Scottish Executive Education Department (SEED) published the results of a study entitled A Seven Year Study of the Effects of Synthetic Phonics Teaching on Reading and Spelling Attainment (Clackmannanshire Report), comparing synthetic phonics with analytic phonics.

Scientifically based research (SBR) (also evidence-based practice in education) first appeared in United States Federal legislation in the Reading Excellence Act and subsequently in the Comprehensive School Reform program. However, it came into prominence in the U.S. under the No child left behind act of 2001 (NCLB), intended to help students in kindergarten through grade 3 who are reading below grade level. Federal funding was made available for education programs and teacher training that are "based on scientifically based reading research". NCLB was replaced in 2015 by the Every Student Succeeds Act (ESSA).

In 2002 the U.S. Department of Education founded the Institute of Education Sciences (IES) to provide scientific evidence to guide education practice and policy.

The State driven Common Core State Standards Initiative was developed in the United States in 2009 in an attempt to standardize education principles and practices. There appears to have been some attempt to incorporate evidence-based practices. For example, the core standards website has a comprehensive description of the specific details of the English Language Arts Standards that include the areas of the alphabetic principle, print concepts, phonological awareness, phonics and word recognition, and fluency. However, it is up to the individual States and school districts to develop plans to implement the standards, and the National Governors Guide to Early Literacy appears to lack details. As of 2020, 41 States had adopted the standards, and in most cases it has taken three or more years to have them implemented. For example, Wisconsin adopted the standards in 2010 and implemented them in the 2014–2015 school year, yet in 2020 the state Department of Public Instruction was in the process of developing materials to support the standards in teaching phonics.

According to reports, the Common Core State Standards Initiative does not appear to have led to a significant national improvement in students' performance. The Center on Standards, Alignment, Instruction, and Learning (C-SAIL) conducted a study of how the Common Core is received in schools. It reported these findings: a) there is moderately high buy-in for the standards among teachers, principals, and superintendents, but buy-in was significantly lower for teachers, b) there is wide variation in teachers' alignment to the standards by content area and grade level, c) specificity is desired by some educators, however states and districts are reluctant to provide too much specificity, d) State officials generally agree that accountability changes under ESSA have allowed them to adopt a "smart power" message that is less punitive and more supportive.

Subsequently, in England the Education Endowment Foundation of London was established in 2011 by The Sutton Trust, as the lead charity of the government-designated What Works Centre for high quality evidence in UK Education.

In 2012 the Department for Education in England introduced an evidence-based "phonics reading check" to help support primary students with reading. (In 2016, the Minister for Education reported that the percentage of primary students not meeting reading expectations reduced from 33% in 2010 to 20% in 2016.)

Evidence-based education in England received a boost from the 2013 briefing paper by Dr. Ben Goldacre. It advocated for systemic change and more randomized controlled trials to assess the effects of educational interventions. He said this was not about telling teachers what to do, but rather "empowering teachers to make independent, informed decisions about what works". Following that a U.K. based non-profit, researchED, was founded to offer a forum for researchers and educationalists to discuss the role of evidence in education.

Discussion and criticism ensued. Some said research methods that are useful in medicine can be entirely inappropriate in the sphere of education.

In 2014 the National Foundation for Educational Research, Berkshire, England published a report entitled Using Evidence in the Classroom: What Works and Why. The review synthesises effective approaches to school and teacher engagement with evidence and discusses challenges, areas for attention and action. It is intended to help the teaching profession to make the best use of evidence about what works in improving educational outcomes.

In 2014 the British Educational Research Association (BERA) and the Royal Society of Arts (RSA) conducted an inquiry into the role of research in teacher education in England, Northern Ireland, Scotland and Wales. The final report made it clear that research and teacher inquiry were of paramount importance in developing self-improving schools. It advocated for a closer working partnership between teacher-researchers and the wider academic research community.

The 2015 Carter Review of Initial Teaching Training in the UK suggested that teacher trainees should have access and skills in using research evidence to support their teaching. However, they do not receive training in utilizing research.

NCLB in the US was replaced in 2015 by the Every Student Succeeds Act (ESSA) that replaced "scientifically based research" with "evidence-based interventions" (any "activity, strategy, or intervention that shows a statistically significant effect on improving student outcomes or other relevant outcomes"). ESSA has four tiers of evidence that some say gives schools and policy makers greater control because they can choose the desired tier of evidence. The evidence tiers are as follows:

- Tier 1 – Strong Evidence: supported by one or more well-designed and well-implemented randomized controlled experimental studies.
- Tier 2 – Moderate Evidence: supported by one or more well-designed and well-implemented quasi-experimental studies.
- Tier 3 – Promising Evidence: supported by one or more well-designed and well-implemented correlational studies (with statistical controls for selection bias).
- Tier 4 – Demonstrates a Rationale: practices that have a well-defined logic model or theory of action, are supported by research, and have some effort underway by state educational agencies (SEA), local educational agencies (LEA), or outside research organization to determine their effectiveness.

In 2016 the Department for Education in England published the White Paper Educational Excellence Everywhere. It states its intention to support an evidence-informed teaching profession by increasing teachers' access to and use of "high quality evidence". It will also establish a new British education journal and expand the Education Endowment Foundation. In addition, on October 4, 2016, the Government announced an investment of around £75 million in the Teaching and Leadership Innovation Fund, to support high-quality, evidence-informed, professional development for teachers and school leaders. A research report in July 2017 entitled Evidence-informed teaching: an evaluation of progress in England concluded this was necessary, but not sufficient. It said that the main challenge for policy makers and researchers was the level of leadership capacity and commitment to make it happen. In other words, the attitudes and actions of school leaders influence how classroom teachers are supported and held accountable for using evidence informed practices.

In 2017 the British Educational Research Association (BERA) examined the role of universities in professional development, focusing especially on teacher education and medical education.

Critics continue, saying "Education research is great but never forget teaching is a complex art form." In 2018, Dylan Wiliam, emeritus Professor of Educational Assessment at University College London, speaking at researchED stated that "Educational research will never tell teachers what to do; their classrooms are too complex for this ever to be possible." Instead, he suggests, teachers should become critical users of educational research and "aware of when even well-established research findings are likely to fail to apply in a particular setting".

== Reception ==
=== Acceptance ===
Since many educators and policy makers are not experienced in evaluating scientific studies and studies have found that "teachers' beliefs are often guided by subjective experience rather than by empirical data", several non-profit organizations have been created to critically evaluate research studies and provide their analysis in a user-friendly manner. They are outlined in research sources and information.

EBP has not been readily adopted in all parts of the education field, leading some to suggest the K-12 teaching profession has suffered a loss of respect because of its science-aversive culture and failure to adopt empirical research as the major determinant of its practices. Speaking in 2017, Harvey Bischof, Ontario Secondary School Teachers' Federation (OSSTF), said there is a need for teacher-centred education based upon what works in the classroom. He suggested that Ontario education "lacks a culture of empiricism" and is vulnerable to gurus, ideologues and advocates promoting unproven trends and fads.

Neuroscientist Mark Seidenberg, University of Wisconsin–Madison, stated that "A stronger scientific ethos (in education) could have provided a much needed defense against bad science", particularly in the field of early reading instruction. Other influential researchers in psychopedagogy, cognitive science and neuroscience, such as Stanislas Dehaene and Michel Fayol have also supported the view of incorporating science into educational practices.

=== Critics and skeptics ===
Skeptics point out that EBP in medicine often produces conflicting results. Others feel that EBE "limits the opportunities for educational professionals to exert their judgment about what is educationally desirable in particular situations".

Some suggest teachers should not pick up research findings and implement them directly into the classroom; instead they advocate for a modified approach some call evidence-informed teaching that combines research with other types of evidence plus personal experience and good judgement; "practice that is influenced by robust research evidence".

Others say there is "a mutual interdependence between science and education", and teachers should become better trained in research science and "take science sufficiently seriously" to see how its methods might inform their practice. Straight talk on evidence has suggested that reports about evidence in education need to be scrutinized for accuracy or subjected to Metascience (research on research).

In a 2020 talk featured on ResearchED, Dylan Wiliam argues that when looking at the cost, benefit and practicality of research, more impact on student achievement will come from a knowledge-rich curriculum and improving teachers' pedagogical skills.

=== Philosophical concerns ===
Some of the criticisms about evidence-based approaches to education relate to concerns about the generalisability of educational research, specifically that research findings are context dependent and that it is difficult to generalise findings from one context to another using a positivist approach. Counter to this position is a view that education researchers have a responsibility to consider the practical value of their research.

There has also been some discussion of a philosophical nature about the validity of scientific evidence. This led James M. Kauffman, University of Virginia, and Gary M. Sasso, University of Iowa, to respond in 2006 suggesting that problems arise with the extreme views of a) the "unbound faith in science" (i.e. scientism) or b) the "criticism of science" (that they label as the "nonsense of postmodernism"). They go on to say that science is "the imperfect but best tool available for trying to reduce uncertainty about what we do as special educators".

==== Meta-analysis ====
A meta-analysis is a statistical analysis that combines the results of multiple scientific studies. A concern of some researchers is the unreliability of some of these reports due to methodological issues. For example, it is suggested that some meta-analyses findings are not credible because they do not exclude or control for studies with small sample sizes or very short durations, and where the researchers are doing the measurements. Such reports can yield "implausible" results. According to Robert Slavin, of the Center for Research and Reform in Education at Johns Hopkins University and Evidence for ESSA, "Meta-analyses are important, because they are widely read and widely cited, in comparison to individual studies. Yet until meta-analyses start consistently excluding, or at least controlling for studies with factors known to inflate mean effect sizes, then they will have little if any meaning for practice."

== Research sources and information ==
The following organizations evaluate research on educational programs, or help educators to understand the research.

=== Best Evidence Encyclopedia (BEE) ===
Best Evidence Encyclopedia (BEE) is a free website created by the Johns Hopkins University School of Education's Center for Data-Driven Reform in Education (established in 2004) and is funded by the Institute of Education Sciences, U.S. Department of Education. It gives educators and researchers reviews about the strength of the evidence supporting a variety of English programs available for students in grades K–12. The reviews cover programs in areas such as mathematics, reading, writing, science, comprehensive school reform, and early childhood education; and includes such topics as effectiveness of technology and struggling readers.

BEE selects reviews that meet consistent scientific standards and relate to programs that are available to educators.

Educational programs in the reviews are rated according to the overall strength of the evidence supporting their effects on students as determined by the combination the quality of the research design and their effect size. The BEE website contains an explanation of their interpretation of effect size and how it might be viewed as a percentile score. It uses the following categories of ratings:

- Strong evidence of effectiveness
- Moderate evidence of effectiveness
- Limited evidence of effectiveness: Strong evidence of modest effects
- Limited evidence of effectiveness: Weak evidence with notable effect
- No qualifying studies

==== Reading programs ====
In 2021, BEE released a review of research on 61 studies of 51 different programs for struggling readers in elementary schools. 84% were randomized experiments and 16% quasi-experiments. The vast majority were done in the US, the programs are replicable, and the studies, done between 1990 and 2018, had a minimum duration of 12 weeks. Many of the programs used phonics-based teaching and/or one or more of the following: cooperative learning, technology-supported adaptive instruction (see Educational technology), metacognitive skills, phonemic awareness, word reading, fluency, vocabulary, multisensory learning, spelling, guided reading, reading comprehension, word analysis, structured curriculum, and balanced literacy (non-phonetic approach). Significantly, table 5 (pg. 88) shows the mean weighted effect sizes of the programs by the manner in which they were conducted (i.e. by school, by classroom, by technology-supported adaptive instruction, by one-to-small-group tutoring, and by one-to-one tutoring). Table 8 (pg. 91) lists the 22 programs meeting ESSA standards for strong and moderate ratings, and their effect size.

The review concludes that a) outcomes were positive for one-to-one tutoring, b) outcomes were positive but not as large for one-to-small group tutoring, c) there were no differences in outcomes between teachers and teaching assistants as tutors, d) technology-supported adaptive instruction did not have positive outcomes, e) whole-class approaches (mostly cooperative learning) and whole-school approaches incorporating tutoring obtained outcomes for struggling readers as large as those found for one- to-one tutoring, and benefitted many more students, and f) approaches mixing classroom and school improvements, with tutoring for the most at-risk students, have the greatest potential for the largest numbers of struggling readers.

The site also offers a newsletter, originated by Robert Slavin the former Director of the Center for Research and Reform in Education, containing information on education around the world. The issue for January 28, 2021 has a chart showing that proven tutoring programs during the regular school year are significantly more effective than other approaches such as summer school (without tutoring), after school, extended-day, and technology. The February 11, 2021 issue makes a case for using Federal Government COVID-19 funding (the Learning Recovery Act) to provide for the "implementation of proven tutoring programs during ordinary school times".

=== Blueprints for healthy youth development ===
Blueprints for Healthy Youth Development, University of Colorado Boulder, offers a registry of evidence-based interventions with "the strongest scientific support" that are effective in promoting a healthy course of action for youth development.

=== Education Endowment Foundation ===
The Education Endowment Foundation of London, England was established in 2011 by The Sutton Trust, as a lead charity in partnership with Impetus Trust, together being the government-designated What Works Centre for UK Education. It offers an online, downloadable Teaching & Learning Toolkit evaluating and describing a variety of educational interventions according to cost, evidence and impact. As an example, it evaluates and describes a 2018 phonics reading program with low cost, extensive evidence and moderate impact.

=== Evidence for ESSA ===
Evidence for ESSA began in 2017 and is produced by the Center for Research and Reform in Education (CRRE) at Johns Hopkins University School of Education, Baltimore, MD. It is reported to have received "widespread support ", and offers free up-to-date information on current PK-12 programs in reading, math, social-emotional learning, and attendance that meet the standards of the Every Student Succeeds Act (ESSA) (the United States K–12 public education policy signed by President Obama in 2015). It also provides information on programs that do meet ESSA standards as well as those that do not.

==== Evidence-based PK-12 programs ====
There are three program categories 1) whole class, 2) struggling readers and 3) English learners. Programs can be filtered by a) ESSA evidence rating (strong, moderate, and promising), b) school grade, c) community (rural, suburban, urban), d) groups (African American, Asian American, Hispanic, White, free and reduced price lunch, English learners, and special education), and e) a variety of features such as cooperative learning, technology, tutoring, etc.

For example, as of June 2020 there were 89 reading programs in the database. After filtering for strong results, grades 1–2, and free and reduced-price lunches, 23 programs remain. If it is also filter for struggling readers, the list is narrowed to 14 programs. The resulting list is shown by the ESSA ratings, Strong, Moderate or Promising. Each program can then be evaluated according to the following: number of studies, number of students, average effect size, ESSA rating, cost, program description, outcomes, and requirements for implementation.

=== Social programs that work and Straight Talk on Evidence ===
Social programs that work and Straight Talk on Evidence are administered by the Arnold Ventures LLC's evidence-based policy team, with offices in Houston, Washington, D.C., and New York City. The team is composed of the former leadership of the Coalition for Evidence-Based Policy, a nonprofit, nonpartisan organization advocating the use of well-conducted randomized controlled trials (RCTs) in policy decisions. It offers information on twelve types of social programs including education.

Social programs that work evaluates programs according to their RCTs and gives them one of three ratings:

- Top Tier: Programs with two or more replicable and well conducted RCTs (or one multi-site RTC), in a typical community settings producing sizable sustained outcomes.
- Near Top Tier: Programs that meet almost all elements of the Top Tier standard but need another replication RCT to confirm the initial findings.
- Suggestive Tier: Programs appearing to be a strong candidate with some shortcomings. They produce sizeable positive effects based on one or more well conducted RCTs (or studies that almost meet this standard); however, the evidence is limited by factors such as short-term follow-up or effects that are not statistically significant.

Education programs include K-12 and postsecondary. The programs are listed under each category according to their rating and the update date is shown. For example, as of June 2020 there were 12 programs under K-12; two were Top Tier, five were Near Top Tier, and the remainder were Suggestive Tier. Each program contains information about the program, evaluation methods, key findings and other data such as the cost per student. Beyond the general category, there does not appear to be any way to filter for only the type of program of interest, however the list may not be especially long.

Straight Talk on Evidence seeks to distinguish between programs that only claim to be effective and other programs showing credible findings of being effective. It reports mostly on randomized controlled trial (RCT) evaluations, recognizing that RCTs offer no guarantee that the study was implemented well, or that its reported results represented the true findings. The lead author of a study is given an opportunity to respond to their report prior to its publication.

=== What Works Clearinghouse (WWC) ===
What Works Clearinghouse (WWC) of Washington, DC, was established in 2002 and evaluates numerous educational programs in twelve categories by the quality and quantity of the evidence and the effectiveness. It is operated by the federal National Center for Education Evaluation and Regional Assistance (NCEE), part of the Institute of Education Sciences (IES)

==== Publications ====
WWC publications are available for a variety of topics (e.g. literacy, charter schools, science, early childhood, etc.) and Type (i.e. Practice guide or Intervention report).

==== Practice guides, tutorials, videos and webinars ====
Practice guides with recommendations are provided covering a wide variety of subjects such as Using Technology to Support Postsecondary Student Learning and Assisting Students Struggling with Reading, etc. Other resources such as tutorials, videos and webinars are also available.

==== Reviews of individual studies ====
Individual studies are available that have been reviewed by WWC and categorized according to the evidence tiers of the United States Every student succeeds act (ESSA). Search filters are available for the following:

- WWC ratings (e.g. meets WWC standards with or without reservations, meets WWC standards without reservations, etc.)
- Topic (e.g. behavior, charter schools, etc.)
- Studies meeting certain design standards (e.g. Randomized controlled trial, Quasi-experiment design, etc.)
- ESSA ratings (e.g. ESSA Tier 1, ESSA Tier 2, etc.)
- Studies with one or more statistically positive findings

==== Intervention reports, programs and search filters ====
Intervention reports are provided for programs according to twelve topics (e.g. literacy, mathematics, science, behavior, etc.).

The filters are helpful to find programs that meet specific criteria. For example, as of July 2020 there were 231 literacy programs in the WWC database. (Note: these are literacy programs that may have several individual trials and some of the trials were conducted as early as 2006.) If these programs are filtered for outcomes in Literacy-Alphabetics the list is narrowed to 25 programs that met WWC standards for evidence and had at least one "potentially positive" effectiveness rating. If the list is further filtered to show only programs in grades one or two, and delivery methods of individual, or small group, or whole class the list is down to 14 programs; and five of those have an effectiveness rating of "strong evidence that intervention had a positive effect on outcomes" in alphabetics.

The resulting list of programs can then be sorted by a) evidence of effectiveness, or b) alphabetically, or c) school grades examined. It is also possible to select individual programs to be compared with each other; however it is advisable to recheck each individual program by searching on the Intervention Reports page. The resulting programs show data in the following areas:

- outcome domain (e.g. alphabetics, oral language, general mathematics achievement, etc.)
- effectiveness rating (e.g. positive, potentially positive, mixed, etc.)
- number of studies meeting WWC standards
- grades examined (e.g. K-4)
- number of students in studies that met the WWC standards, and
- improvement index (i.e. the expected change in percentile rank).

It is also possible to view the program's Evidence snapshot, detailed Intervention report and Review protocols. For other independent "related reviews", go to the evidence snapshot then the WWC Summary of Evidence.

The following chart, updated in July 2020, shows some programs that had "strong evidence" of a "positive effect on outcomes" in the areas specified. The results may have changed since that time, however current information is available on the WWC website, including the outcome domains that did not have "strong evidence".

Program	Intervention Description	Grades	Improvement area and expected change in percentile rank
Success for All	In kindergarten through first grade, teachers read aloud and discuss with students focusing on phonemic awareness, auditory discrimination, and sound blending. In the second through fifth grades cooperative learning activities built around partner reading are used. It is delivered with daily 90-minute reading classes consisting of 15–20 students, grouped by performance and regardless of their age. One-on-one tutoring is provided to students with learning difficulties.	K-4	Alphabetics (+9%)
READ 180	A reading program for those that are two or more grades years below grade level. The classes start off with whole-class instructions, which is followed by computer practices that are adaptive and individualized, small group activities or independent reading, with a whole-class wrap up in the end of the class.	4–10	Comprehension (+6%) and general literacy achievement (+4%)
Phonological Awareness Training	Activities where children identify, detect, delete, segment, or blend segments of spoken words (i.e., words, syllables, onsets and rimes, phonemes) or that focus on teaching children to detect, identify, or produce rhyme or alliteration.	PK	Phonological processing (+27%)
Phonological Awareness Training plus Letter Knowledge Training	The added letter knowledge training component includes teaching children the letters of the alphabet and making an explicit link between letters and sounds.	PK	Phonological processing (+30%), Print knowledge(+27)
Reading recovery	Daily 30 minute one-on-one tutoring sessions to students who have difficulties in reading and writing over the course of 12–20 weeks.	1	Alphabetics (+21%), Reading achievement (+27)
Instructional Conversations and Literature Logs	Program for English learners where teachers engage students to Instructional Conversations, where stories or personal experiences are discussed with teachers acting as facilitators. Literature Logs require students to respond in writing to prompts or questions. Responses are then shared in small groups or with a partner.	2–5	Reading achievement (+29%)
SpellRead	Literacy program for struggling readers, including special education students and English language learners. SpellRead breaks the recognizing and manipulating of English sounds into specific skills, and focuses on mastering each skill through systematic and explicit instruction.	5–6	Alphabetics (+18%)
Dialogic Reading	Shared picture book reading practice where the adult and the child switch roles so that the child learns to become the storyteller with the assistance of the adult, who functions as an active listener and questioner.	PK	Oral language (+19%)
DaisyQuest	Computer-assisted instruction with a storyline and practices that teach children how to recognize words that rhyme; words that have the same beginning, middle, and ending sounds, words that can be formed from a series of phonemes presented separately and also teaches children how to count the number of sounds in words.	PK–1	Alphabetics (+23%)
Earobics	Interactive software that provides individual instruction for phonemic awareness, auditory processing, and phonics, as well as the cognitive and language skills required for comprehension. Each level of instruction addresses recognizing and blending sounds, rhyming, and discriminating phonemes. The software is supported by audio, video and reading materials.	3	Alphabetics (+19%)
Stepping Stones to Literacy	The program includes serial rapid automatic naming activities where children practice making quick visual-verbal associations of known sets of colors, numbers, and/or letter names in a left-to-right format, and instructional prompts in English and Spanish.	3	Alphabetics (+30%)
Teach For America	Placing non-traditionally trained teachers in high-need public schools. Many TFA teachers hold bachelor's degrees from selective colleges and universities.	12	Mathematics Achievement (+4%)
Caring School Community (CSC)	Program consists of class meeting lessons, cross-age "buddies" programs, "homeside" activities, and creation of schoolwide community by bringing school staff, parents and students together to create new school traditions.	6	Behavior (+8%), Knowledge, attitudes, and values (+7%)
First Step to Success	Program seeks to detect children who at risk to develop antisocial behavior patterns and match them with behavior coaches who work with the child, his or her classpeers and parents for approximately 50–60 hours over a 3-month period.	3	External behavior (+28%)
Dual Enrollment Programs	The intervention allows high school students to take college courses and earn college credits while still attending high school.	9–12	Access and enrollment (+15), Attainment (+25), Completing school (+7), Credit accumulation (+14), General academic achievement – high school (+7)
Check & Connect	Students are assigned a "monitor" who regularly checks their performance (in particular, whether students are having attendance, behavior, or academic problems) and connects with school personnel, family members, and community service providers when problems are identified.	9–12	Staying in school (+25)
ACT/SAT Test Preparation and Coaching Programs	Test preparation programs with the goal of increasing student scores on college entrance tests.	10–12	General academic achievement-high school (+9)
Positive action	Teaches children positive and constructive way of thinking about themselves and acting towards others using methods such as discussions, role-playing and games. The program uses factsheets, booklets and songs as teaching material.	1–12	Behavior (+19%)
Coping power	The program consists of a child and a parent component. The child component consists of thirty-four 50 minute group sessions and periodic individual sessions over the course of 15–18 months. The parent component consists of 16 group sessions and periodic individual meetings. The child component emphasizes goal setting, problem-solving, anger management and peer relationships and consists, while the parent lessons emphasize setting expectations, praise, discipline, managing stress, communication and child study skills.	K–12 students with emotional disturbances	External behavior (+8%)
Too Good for Drugs and Violence	The program promotes prosocial behavior and norms, and consists of 14 core lessons with additional 12 lessons that include roleplaying and co-operative learning. Pupils are encouraged to apply the skills taught, for example by infusing the lessons into subjects such as English, science or social studies	5, with additional program for 8	Knowledge, attitudes and values (+16%)
Pre-K Mathematics	The program uses small group activities (4 – 6 children) with concrete manipulatives and includes take-home picture strips and activities that are designed to help parents support their learning, as well as a software with activities to reinforce the lessons.	PK	General mathematics achievement (19%)
Literacy Express	Includes lessons on oral language, emergent literacy, basic math, science, general knowledge, socioemotional development. It offers the staff with recommendations for room arrangement, daily schedules, classroom management and activities, and provides them with teaching materials.	PK students, especially those with special needs	Print knowledge (+15%), oral language (+12%) and phonological processing (+12%)
Accelerated Middle Schools	The intervention gives additional teaching and attempts to cover an additional year of curriculum during its 1 or 2-year duration. Classes link multiple subjects and are designed to have a "hands on" practical approach.	6–8, High risk and low performing students in grades who are behind their grade levels	Progressing in school (+35%), staying in school (+18%)

Some of the concerns expressed about WWC are that it appears to have difficulty keeping up with the research so it may not be current; and when a program is not listed on their database, it may be that it did not meet their criteria or they have not yet reviewed it, but you don't know which. In addition Straight Talk on Evidence, authored by the Arnold Ventures LLC' Evidence-Based Policy team, on January 16, 2018, expressed concerns about the validity of the ratings provided by WWC. It says WWC in some cases reported a "preliminary outcome when high-quality RCTs found no significant effects on more important and final educational outcomes".

A summary of the January 2020 changes to the WWC procedures and standards is available on their site.

=== Other sources of information ===
- The British Educational Research Association (BERA) claims to be the home of educational research in the United Kingdom. It is a membership association that aims to improve the knowledge of education by advancing research quality, capacity and engagement. Its resources include a quarterly magazine, journals, articles, and conferences.
- Campbell Collaboration is a nonprofit organization that promotes evidence-based decisions and policy through the production of systematic reviews and other types of evidence synthesis. It has wide spread international support, and allows users to easily search by topic area (e.g. education) or key word (e.g. reading).
- Doing What Works is provided by WestEd, a San Francisco-based nonprofit organization, and offers an online library that includes interviews with researchers and educators, in addition to materials and tools for educators. WestEd was criticized in January 2020, claiming they did not interview all interested parties prior to releasing a report.
- Early Childhood Technical Assistance Center (ECTA), of Chapel Hill, NC, provides resources on evidence-based practices in areas specific to early childhood care and education, professional development, early intervention and early childhood special education.
- Florida Center for Reading Research is a research center at Florida State University that explores all aspects of reading research. Its Resource Database allows you to search for information based on a variety of criteria.
- Institute of Education Sciences (IES), Washington, DC, is the statistics, research, and evaluation arm of the U.S. Department of Education. It funds independent education research, evaluation and statistics. It published a Synthesis of its Research on Early Intervention and Early Childhood Education in 2013. Its publications and products can be searched by author, subject, etc.
- The International Initiative for Impact Evaluation (3ie) is a registered non-governmental organisation, since 2008, with offices in New Delhi, London and Washington, DC. Its self-described vision is to improve lives through evidence-informed action in developing countries. In 2016 their researchers synthesised evidence from 238 impact evaluations and 121 qualitative research studies and process evaluations in 52 low-and middle-income countries (L&MICs). It looked at children's school enrolment, attendance, completion and learning.The results can be viewed in their report entitled The impact of education programmes on learning and school participation in low- and middle-income countries.
- National Foundation for Educational Research (NFER) is a non-profit research and development organization based in Berkshire, England. It produces independent research and reports about issues across the education system, such as Using Evidence in the Classroom: What Works and Why.
- Office for Standards in Education (Ofsted), in England, conducts research on schools, early education, social care, further education and skills.
- The Ministry of Education, Ontario, Canada offers a site entitled What Works? Research Into Practice. It is a collection of research summaries of promising teaching practice written by experts at Ontario universities.
- RAND Corporation, with offices throughout the world, funds research on early childhood, K-12, and higher education.
- ResearchED, a U.K. based non-profit since 2013 has organized education conferences around the world (e.g. Africa, Australia, Asia, Canada, the E.U., the Middle East, New Zealand, the U.K. and the U.S.) featuring researchers and educators in order to "promote collaboration between research-users and research-creators". It has been described as a "grass-roots teacher-led project that aims to make teachers research-literate and pseudo-science proof". It also publishes an online magazine featuring articles by practicing teachers and others such as professor Daniel T. Willingham (University of Virginia) and Professor Dylan Wiliam (Emeritus professor, UCL Institute of Education). And finally, it offers frequent, free online video presentations on subjects such as curriculum design, simplifying your practice, unleashing teachers' expertise, the bridge over the reading gap, education post-corona, remote teaching, teaching critical thinking, etc. The free presentations are also available on its YouTube channel. ResearchED has been featured in online debates about so called "teacher populism".
- Research 4 Schools, University of Delaware is supported by the Institute of Education Sciences, U.S. Department of Education and offers peer-reviewed research about education.

== See also ==
- Educational research
- Educational psychology
- Evidence-based legislation
- Evidence-based policy
- Science of reading
