= Systematic phonics =

System of teaching reading

Systematic phonics is an umbrella term used to describe phonics approaches that are taught explicitly and in a structured, systematic manner. They are called systematic because they involve teaching and practicing a planned, sequential set of phonic elements. Specifically, the letter-sound relations are taught in a "prespecified" sequence, as opposed to incidentally or on a "when needed" basis.

A Course of Study in Phonics (224 lessons), San Francisco, U.S., 1912

In addition to being explicit and structured, systematic phonics is often accompanied by instruction that is cumulative, multisensory, and supported by diagnostics.

== Overview ==
The National Reading Panel (NRP) in the U.S. concluded that systematic phonics instruction is more effective than unsystematic phonics or non-phonics instruction. The NRP also found that systematic phonics instruction is effective (with varying degrees) when delivered through one-to-one tutoring, small groups, and teaching classes of students; and is effective from kindergarten onward, the earlier the better. It helps significantly with word-reading skills and reading comprehension for kindergartners and 1st graders as well as for older struggling readers and reading-disabled students. Benefits to spelling were positive for kindergartners and 1st graders but not for older students.

Systematic phonics is sometimes mischaracterised as "skill and drill" with little attention to meaning. However, researchers point out that this impression is false. Teachers can use engaging games or materials to teach letter-sound connections, and it can also be incorporated with the reading of meaningful text.

Phonics can be taught systematically in a variety of ways, such as analogy phonics, analytic phonics, phonics through spelling, and synthetic phonics. However, their effectiveness varies considerably because the methods differ in such areas as the range of letter-sound coverage, the structure of the lesson plans, and the time devoted to specific instructions.

Systematic phonics has gained increased acceptance in different parts of the world since the completion of four major studies into teaching reading:

- 2000 – National Reading Panel (NRP) (U.S.) The NRP identified five ingredients of effective reading instruction: phonemic awareness, phonics, fluency, vocabulary, and comprehension. It concluded that systematic phonics instruction is more effective than unsystematic phonics instruction or those with no phonics instruction.
- 2005 – Teaching Reading, National Inquiry into the Teaching of Literacy (Australia 2005-The Rowe Report) This report supports the use of Systematic Phonics.
- 2006 – Independent review of the teaching of early reading (Rose Report 2006) (England) The Rose Report supports Synthetic phonics.
- 2022 – Right to Read inquiry report (R2R) (Canada) The R2R report from the Ontario Human Rights Commission (OHRC) says that teachers need to be trained in evidence-based instruction methods and concludes that Structured literacy "is the most effective way to teach early reading". (Note: Sources:)

In 2009, the Department for Education in the UK published a curriculum review for England that added support for systematic phonics. In fact, systematic phonics in the UK is known as synthetic phonics (see below).

Beginning as early as 2014, several states in the United States have changed their curriculum to include systematic phonics instruction in elementary school, as it relates to evidence-based practices and the science of reading.

In 2018, the State Government of Victoria, Australia, published a website containing a comprehensive Literacy Teaching Toolkit including Effective Reading Instruction, Phonics, and Sample Phonics Lessons.

== Possible types of systematic phonics programs ==
The following types of phonics programs have the potential to become systematic provided they meet the criteria mentioned earlier.

=== Analytic phonics and analogy phonics ===
Analytic phonics does not involve pronouncing individual sounds (phonemes) in isolation and blending the sounds, as is done in synthetic phonics. Rather, it is taught at the word level and students learn to analyse letter-sound relationships once the word is identified. For example, students might be asked to practice saying words with similar sounds such as ball, bat and bite. Furthermore, students are taught consonant blends (separate, adjacent consonants) as units, such as br in break and or shr in shrouds.

Analogy phonics is a particular type of analytic phonics in which the teacher has students analyse phonic elements according to the speech sounds (phonograms) in the word. For example, a type of phonogram (known in linguistics as a rime) is composed of the vowel and the consonant sounds that follow it (e.g. in the words cat, mat and sat, the rime is "at".) Teachers using the analogy method may have students memorize a bank of phonograms, such as -at or -am, or use word families (e.g., can, ran, man, or may, play, say).

There have been studies on the effectiveness of instruction using analytic phonics vs. synthetic phonics. Johnston et al. (2012) conducted experimental research studies that tested the effectiveness of phonics learning instruction among 10-year-old boys and girls. They used comparative data from the Clackmannanshire Report and chose 393 participants to compare synthetic phonics instruction and analytic phonics instruction. The boys taught by the synthetic phonics method had better word reading than the girls in their classes, and their spelling and reading comprehension was as good. On the other hand, with analytic phonics teaching, although the boys performed as well as the girls in word reading, they had inferior spelling and reading comprehension. Overall, the group taught by synthetic phonics had better word reading, spelling, and reading comprehension. And, synthetic phonics did not lead to any impairment in the reading of irregular words.

=== Phonics through spelling ===
For some teachers, this is a method of teaching spelling by using the sounds (phonemes). However, it can also be a method of teaching reading by focusing on the sounds and their spelling (i.e., phonemes and syllables). It is taught systematically with guided lessons conducted in a direct and explicit manner including appropriate feedback. Sometimes mnemonic cards containing individual sounds are used to allow the student to practice saying the sounds that are related to a letter or letters (e.g., a, e, i, o, u). Accuracy comes first, followed by speed. The sounds may be grouped by categories such as vowels that sound short (e.g., c-a-t and s-i-t). When the student is comfortable recognizing and saying the sounds, the following steps might be followed: a) the tutor says a target word and the student repeats it out loud, b) the student writes down each individual sound (letter) until the word is completely spelled, saying each sound as it is written, and c) the student says the entire word out loud. An alternate method would be to have the student use mnemonic cards to sound-out (spell) the target word.

Typically, the instruction starts with sounds that have only one letter and simple CVC words such as sat and pin. Then it progresses to longer words, and sounds with more than one letter (e.g., hear and day), and perhaps even syllables (e.g., wa-ter). Sometimes the student practices by saying (or sounding-out) cards that contain entire words.

=== Structured literacy ===
Structured literacy has many of the elements of systematic phonics and few of the elements of balanced literacy. It is defined as explicit, systematic teaching that focuses on phonological awareness, word recognition, phonics and decoding, spelling, and syntax at the sentence and paragraph levels. It is considered to be beneficial for all early literacy learners, especially those with dyslexia.

According to the International Dyslexia Association, structured literacy contains the elements of phonology and phonemic awareness, sound-symbol association (the alphabetic principle and phonics), syllables, morphology, syntax, and semantics. The elements are taught using methods that are systematic, cumulative, explicit, multisensory, and use diagnostic assessment.

A meta-analysis published in 2024 concluded that Structured literacy approaches "tend to yield larger positive effects on student learning as compared to balanced literacy approaches". Structured literacy was found to have a mean unweighted effect size of .47, and a fixed weighted mean effect size of .44. (meta-analysis 2024)

There is general agreement that SL is beneficial for all early literacy learners, especially those with reading disabilities such as dyslexia. (Note: Sources:) However, according to professor Mark Seidenberg, while SL is necessary for students with special needs (e.g., to overcome dyslexia), he suggests that teachers strike a balance between implicit instruction and explicit instruction, with explicit instruction for all students at the start, followed by implicit instruction for all students except dyslexics (who continue to receive explicit instruction as required)

Another example of using a structured approach to teach reading is the UFLI Foundations curriculum, which was developed by researchers at the University of Florida Literacy Institute. Using this program, kindergarteners and 1st-graders progressed much quicker in terms of reading skills than students receiving regular teaching.

=== Synthetic phonics ===
As mentioned, Synthetic phonics is the officially recognized name for Systematic phonics in the UK. It uses the concept of 'synthesising', which means 'putting together' or 'blending'. This is where sounds prompted by the letters are synthesised to pronounce the word.

Synthetic phonics refers to a family of programs which aim to teach reading and writing through the following methods:

- Teaching students the correspondence between written letters (graphemes) and speech sounds (phonemes).
- Teaching students to read words by blending: identifying the graphemes (letters) in the word, recalling the corresponding phonemes (sounds), and saying the phonemes together to form the sound of the whole word.
- Teaching students to write words by segmenting spoken words: identifying the phonemes of the word, recalling the corresponding graphemes, then writing the graphemes together to form the written word.

Synthetic phonics programs have some or all of the following characteristics:

- Teaching letter-sounds out of alphabetic order, following an order determined by the number of words that can be spelled with those letter-sounds at an early stage (e.g., more than 50 words can be spelled using only the most common sounds corresponding to s, a, t, i, p, n).
- Teaching the reading and writing of words in order of increasing irregularity, in other words teaching words which use typical letter-sounds first (e.g. fan and ape), and teaching words with more unusual letter-sounds later (e.g. phone and eight).

There have been studies on the effectiveness of instruction using analytic phonics vs. synthetic phonics. Johnston et al. (2012) conducted experimental research studies that tested the effectiveness of phonics learning instruction among 10-year-old boys and girls. They used comparative data from the Clackmannanshire Report and chose 393 participants to compare synthetic phonics instruction and analytic phonics instruction. The boys taught by the synthetic phonics method had better word reading than the girls in their classes, and their spelling and reading comprehension was as good. On the other hand, with analytic phonics teaching, although the boys performed as well as the girls in word reading, they had inferior spelling and reading comprehension. Overall, the group taught by synthetic phonics had better word reading, spelling, and reading comprehension. And, synthetic phonics did not lead to any impairment in the reading of irregular words.

The NRP also says the phonemic awareness skills found to give the greatest reading advantage to kindergarten and first-grade children are segmenting and blending, a key part of synthetic phonics.

On the other hand, Timothy Shanahan, a member of the NRP, believes that, based on that report, there is no significant difference between analytic phonics and synthetic phonics, so you should "add some synthetic or analytic instruction" depending on what works best for the learners.

== See also ==
- Evidence-based education
- Phonics
- Reading
- Reading comprehension
- Reading disability
- Reading for special needs
- Science of reading
- Simple view of reading
- Structured literacy
- Synthetic phonics
