= Deon L. Butler =

American author, literacy advocate, and former professional American football player

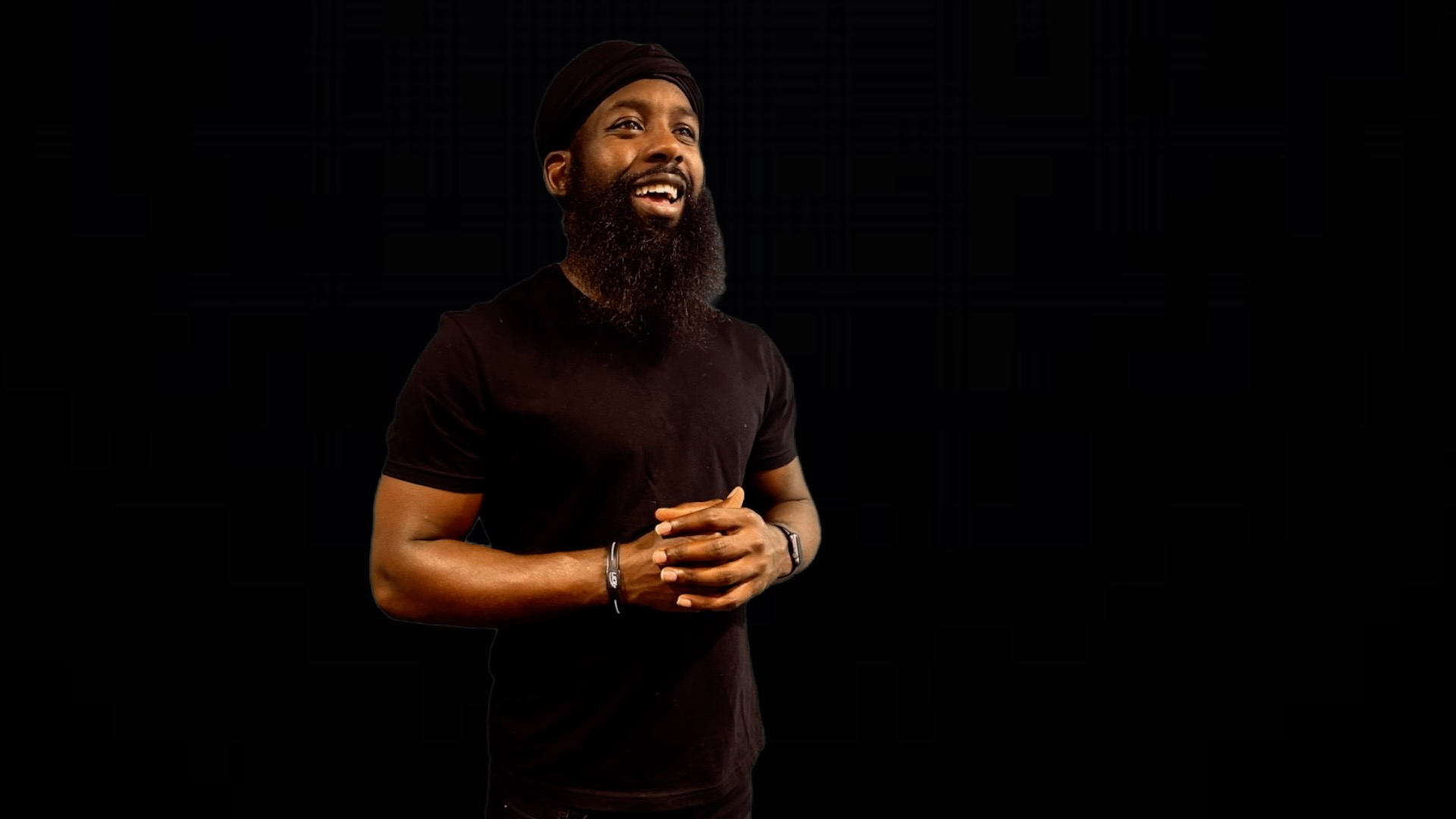
- Born: Detroit, Michigan, U.S.
- Occupations: Author, literacy advocate, former American football player
- Organization: Stand Strong Services LLC
- Known for: Dyslexia advocacy; literacy initiatives; The Gift & Curse, One Man's Journey With Dyslexia

Deon L. Butler is an American author, literacy advocate, and former professional American football player. He played college football at Central Michigan University and later signed with the Detroit Lions of the National Football League (NFL) in 2015. Butler is the founder and CEO of Stand Strong Services LLC, an organization focused on literacy, dyslexia awareness, and educational advocacy.

He is known for his dyslexia advocacy, public speaking, and his memoir The Gift & Curse: One Man’s Journey with Dyslexia (2025).

== Early life and education ==
Butler was born in Detroit, Michigan, and raised in Inkster. He struggled with undiagnosed dyslexia throughout childhood and graduated from high school reading at a fourth‑grade level. He earned a football scholarship to Central Michigan University, where he played tight end and studied child development.

== Football career ==
During his senior year at Central Michigan, Butler played in the 2014 Bahamas Bowl and contributed to a widely publicized scoring play at the end of the game that became known as one of the most famous comebacks in college football.

In 2015, he signed with the Detroit Lions. Butler later stated that the complexity of NFL playbooks, combined with his undiagnosed dyslexia, contributed to challenges during his professional career.

== Literacy advocacy ==
After leaving professional football, Butler was diagnosed with dyslexia and began intensive literacy tutoring. He has since become a national speaker on literacy, resilience, and educational equity.

His work has also been highlighted in national media, including a feature in BlackNews.com that profiled Butler and fellow advocate Ameer Baraka as leaders in a national conversation on literacy, dyslexia, and adult reading challenges.

Butler has spoken at schools, universities, and conferences across the United States, including the Michigan Department of Education’s 2025 Diversity in Literature Symposium and the Leading Literacy Summit hosted by the State University of New York at New Paltz.

His advocacy work has also been featured in media interviews, including a 2026 appearance on the Nexstar Media podcast "Beyond the Stands," where he discussed his journey with dyslexia and his efforts to support struggling readers.

He has also spoken at student wellness and literacy events, including a 2026 program at Berwick Middle School in Pennsylvania, where he addressed students on confidence, resilience, and reading.

He also spent several days in Hinton, West Virginia in 2026, speaking with students and community members about literacy, resilience, and overcoming learning challenges.

He has also supported dyslexia legislation efforts in Pennsylvania, where his advocacy was formally recognized by the Pennsylvania General Assembly.

He has also been recognized for his involvement in statewide literacy policy efforts, including advocacy surrounding Michigan’s K–12 dyslexia legislation, Public Acts 146 and 147 of 2024.

== Publications ==
- The Gift & Curse: One Man’s Journey with Dyslexia (2025).

== See also ==
- Science of reading
