= Joanne Yatvin =

American public school educator

Joanne Yatvin is an American public school educator. Formerly a president of the National Council of Teachers of English, she was a member of the National Reading Panel (1997–2000), mandated by the US Congress to assess different methods of literacy education. She published a "minority report" separately, saying that panel members lacked integrity. She taught at Portland State University.

Her research has included the study of the relation between speech manipulation and reading comprehension.
