= READ 180 =

Reading intervention program

READ 180 is a reading intervention program in the USA. It was created by the Scholastic Corporation (Scholastic). Its focus is to utilize adaptive technology to improve literacy in students in Grades 4–12 who read at least two years below their grade level.

In 2011, Scholastic released its newest version, READ 180 Next Generation, aligned to meet the requirements of the Common Core State Standards Initiative. Scholastic sold READ 180 to Houghton Mifflin Harcourt in 2015.

== History ==
READ 180 was founded in 1985 by Ted Hasselbring and members of the Cognition and Technology Group at Vanderbilt University. With a grant from the United States Department of Education’s Office of Special Education, Dr. Hasselbring developed software that used student performance data to individualize and differentiate the path of computerized reading instruction. This software became the prototype for the READ 180 program.

Between 1994 and 1998, Dr. Hasselbring and his team tested their work in Orange County, Florida. The Orange County Literacy Project used this READ 180 prototype with more than 10,000 students. The Journal of Research on Educational Effectiveness documented the positive results of this test, leading to Scholastic partnering with Orange County public schools and Vanderbilt University to license the software, and to launch READ 180.

In 2006, Scholastic released READ 180 Enterprise Edition in collaboration with Dr. Kevin Feldman and Dr. Kate Kinsella. READ 180 Enterprise Edition featured the READ 180 rBook, structured engagement routines for English language learners, and the Scholastic Achievement Manager (SAM).

== Program structure ==
READ 180 is a reading program with the goal of providing differentiated instruction for a diverse classroom. The program focuses on reading components including, but not limited to, phonemic awareness, phonological awareness, fluency, vocabulary, and reading comprehension. READ 180 is specifically designed for students who have been classified as reading below grade-level. The program can be used with all students but has been used most extensively with special education students and students classified as English language learners. READ 180 provides tools to these students and their teachers to improve their reading performance.

READ 180 is a balanced literacy program, which creates an even balance between the time that is devoted to activities based on skills, like phonemic awareness and phonics, and activities based on literature, like making an inference.

Teachers begin and end each class session with whole-group instruction, focusing on vocabulary, reading aloud, and a specific comprehension skill (such as key ideas or inferences). Next, students break into one of three rotations: small-group, student application, and independent reading. In the small group, the teacher leads students in small-group instruction, using the READ 180 text called the ReaL Book. During this time, the teacher monitors reading and differentiates instruction based on students’ needs. While this occurs, other students work independently in the READ 180 student application on computers. The software leads students through six Learning Zones: the Explore Zone, the Reading Zone, the Fluency Zone, the Language Zone, the Writing Zone, and the Success Zone. The final rotation asks students to read independently. As of 2016, students could select from the READ 180 paperback library or digital library.

=== Placement ===
The Scholastic Reading Inventory (SRI) is a technology-based universal screener and progress monitor. SRI is used to generate a Lexile, or readability level, for each student. The purpose of administering the SRI is to determine if the student is a candidate for intervention. SRI is software that “assesses students’ reading levels, tracks students’ growth over time, and helps guide instruction according to students’ needs.”

== Effectiveness studies ==
A study conducted in 2008 looked at finding the best effective reading program through specific evidence-based research. The study looked at many different programs as well, READ 180 being one that they chose to research. The study looked at data collected from students of all ages using READ 180, as it can be used in elementary school through high school. The study noted that students showed improvement in reading thanks to READ 180. Part of this is due to the fact that students are receiving more reading instruction, as READ 180 is to be taught in ninety minute class periods, which is longer than the average student receives for reading instruction. The study also found that READ 180 is more successful for middle school and high school students.

Lang, et al. conducted another study regarding READ 180 in 2009. This study explored the effectiveness of reading intervention programs that could be categorized as intensive. The study lasted for a year and looked at twelve hundred ninth-grade students who were in high-risk and moderated-risk groups. The study assigned these students one of four different reading intervention programs. One of those was READ 180, which was assigned to twenty-five percent of the participants. Looking at the results from those students, researchers found an increase in scores on standardized tests, especially for the students classified as moderate-risk. The study also found that READ 180 helped improve students' reading comprehension, as well as help them build fluency.

In 2010, researchers from the University of Florida and the National Sun Yat-Sen University conducted a study on the efficacy of READ 180 for adolescent English language learners in the United States. The study looked at the efficacy of READ 180 in terms of students' reading and cultural needs; specifically, the cultural responsiveness of READ 180 texts and how well this engaged immigrant students. The researchers found that READ 180 helped to improve reading comprehension for the students included in the studies.

In 2022, researchers from Njala University, Freetown Teachers College and Kwame Nkruma University of Science and Technology published the results of a study into the effectiveness of reading interventions for lower primary school students in Sierra Leone. This study was done because students were struggling with reading, a struggle that only increased after schools shutdown due to the COVID-19 pandemic. After schools returned to in-person learning in Sierra Leone, schools began using READ 180. In the study conducted, researchers found that a significant improvement was observed after four weeks, specifically showing a decrease in reading mistakes in elementary school students. The study also stressed a need for schools in Sierra Leone to continue to use READ 180 to allow students to continue to improve.
