= Society for the Scientific Study of Reading =

The Society for the Scientific Study of Reading was created in 1993 by Ronald P. Carver. The purpose of SSSR is to promote the scientific study of reading and to disseminate information about reading and related areas such as language and literacy. The society sponsors conferences and a peer-reviewed academic journal, Scientific Studies of Reading.
