= Nell K. Duke =

Nell K. Duke is a contemporary educator and literacy researcher with an interest in informational text, early literacy development, and reading comprehension instruction, with an emphasis on children living in poverty. She is currently a professor of language, literacy, and culture and a faculty associate in the combined program in education and psychology at the University of Michigan.

== Education ==
Nell K. Duke earned a B.A. from Swarthmore College in 1993. She completed a Special Major in Linguistics, with Cognates in Psychology and Education, a Concentration in Black Studies, and a certification program in Elementary Education. She earned both an Ed. M. and an Ed. D. in Human Development and Psychology, with an emphasis on Language and Literacy from Harvard University.

== Career ==
After completing her B.A., Nell Duke was the Supervisor of the Harvard Literacy Laboratory and a Teaching Fellow at Harvard University from 1994-1996. She then served as a trainer for various programs including, Reach Out: Help Teach a Child to Read Program, America Reads Program, Harvard Emergent Literacy Project, and the BELL Foundation. During this time she also Co-Founded the Neighborhood House Charter School Summer Literacy Institute in Dorchester, Massachusetts. In 1997-98, she served the school as the Primary Grades Literacy Specialist.

Dr. Duke is the recipient of several prestigious awards early in her career. In 1999, she was the recipient of the Promising Researcher Award from the National Council of Teachers of English. The following year she was recognized by the International Reading Association for the Outstanding Dissertation Award. Other awards include the Early Career Award from the American Educational Research Association, the Early Career Achievement Award from the National Reading Conference (now Literacy Research Association), the Dina Feitelson Research Award from the International Reading Association, and the Excellence in Teaching Award from the Michigan State University College of Education.

== Major Topics of Research ==
=== Information Literacy ===
In 2000, Duke published a seminal research article on the scarcity of informational text in classroom environments and activities. The research brings to light the sparse quantity of informational text available to children and the limited instruction or activities with informational literacy materials, an average of 3.6 minutes a day, in the primary classroom. In the study, twenty first grade classrooms were observed, ten from high socio-economic status SES schools and ten from low SES schools. Students from low SES schools had even fewer opportunities with informational texts than students from higher SES schools. The amount, type, and uses of print are less in the lower SES classroom

The concept of informational text in the classroom was a discussion point among literacy researchers before this article, but this article highlighted the lack of informational text in classroom libraries, as part of the classroom environment, and the use of the text in instruction in the primary classroom. Since the publication of this seminal piece, it has been cited in over 200 articles .

Recent articles include suggestions for incorporation of more quantity and quality of informational text in the classroom. Teachers can increase access through more informational texts in classroom libraries and environmental print in the classroom, and increase time devoted to instruction using information text through read aloud and strategy instruction. Students need to be taught how to read the informational text with specific comprehension strategies and the use of these texts for authentic purposes increases reading growth in students

=== Methodology and Research in Education ===
Duke values a range research methodologies for reading research as evidence by a variety of methodologies in her own research and through the edited book Literacy Research Methodologies, she co-edited the book, now in its second edition, with Marla Mallette. In the edited book, she and Mallette conclude with five messages for literacy researchers. There are many different research methodologies available and can make contributions to the field. Yet, there are examples of great and poor usages of every methodology. The methodology chosen should match the research question and any claims from the research methodology should be supported by the specific methodology. Research studies of similar questions can demonstrate complementary results using different methodologies and this use is encouraged

In a book chapter with Pearson, Strachan, and Billman, Duke suggests 10 elements of fostering comprehension growth: building disciplinary and world knowledge, providing exposure to a volume and range of texts, providing motivating texts and contexts for reading, teaching strategies for comprehending, teaching text structures, engaging students in discussion, building vocabulary and language knowledge, integrating reading and writing, observing and assessing, and differentiating instruction.

IDuke (and Beck(1999)) argue that the current form of dissertations is not an authentic format for new researchers to learn how to participate in the academic realm. A goal of research is to disseminate information, however, in the current dissertation format most dissertations have only a select audience. The dissertation format is a genre in and of itself, and if PhD candidates are able to publish their findings, it requires massive rewrites. Suggestions for alternative dissertation formats include article(s) ready for publication in literacy research journals or in educator publications, depending on the goal of the degree.

== Awards ==
• 1999 Promising Researcher Award, National Council of Teachers of English

• 2000 Outstanding Dissertation Award, International Reading Association

• 2002 Dina Feitelson Research Award, International Reading Association

• 2003 Early Career Achievement Award, National Reading Conference

2009 Early Career Award from the American Educational Research Association

2010 Excellence in Teaching Award from the Michigan State University College of Education.

== Publications ==
Nell Duke has authored, co-authored, or co-edited books including Reading and Writing Genre with Purpose in K - 8 Classrooms (2012), “Literacy Research Methodologies” (2004, 2011), “Beyond Bedtime Stories: A Parent’s Guide to Promoting Reading, Writing, and other literacy skills form birth to 5” (2007), “Literacy and the Youngest Learner: Best Practices for Educators of Children from Birth to Five.” (2005), and Reading and Writing Informational Text in the Primary Grades: Research-Based Practices (2003).

She is also the author or co-author of numerous chapters within books and peer-reviewed journals.

== Collaborators and Co-Authors ==
- Victoria Purcell-Gates
- P. David Pearson
- V. Susan Bennett-Armistead
- Annie M. Moses
- Shenglan Zhang
- Michael Pressley
