= Timothy Shanahan (educator) =

American educator and researcher

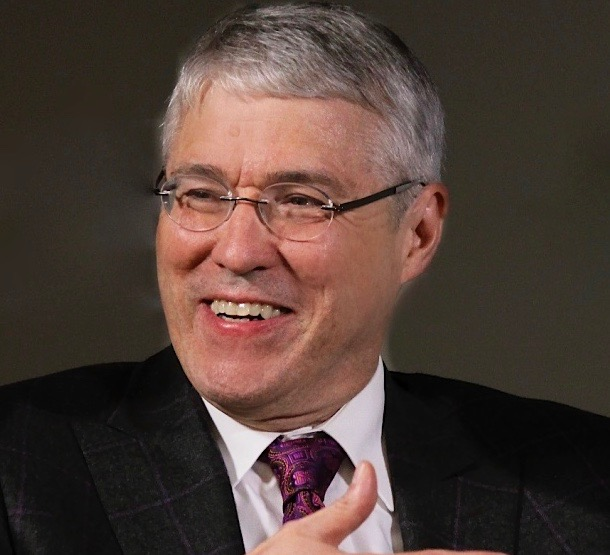

Timothy Shanahan is an educator, researcher, and education policy-maker focused on literacy education. He is Distinguished Professor Emeritus in Education, at the University of Illinois at Chicago, College of Education, Department of Curriculum & Instruction, and he has held a visiting research appointment at Queens University, Belfast, Northern Ireland. He was elected president of the International Literacy Association in 2004. He operates the popular informational website, Shanahan on Literacy. He was recently recognized as one of the top 2% of scientists in the world, according to a recent study published by Stanford University scholars (Ioannidis, Boyack, & Baas, 2020).

Shanahan previously served as Director of Reading for the Chicago Public Schools under Chief Executive Officer Arne Duncan. He was appointed by President George W. Bush to serve on the board of advisors of the National Institute of Literacy, and he completed his term under Presidents George W. Bush and Barack Obama.

Shanahan has written or edited numerous books and monographs and has written more than 200 articles, chapters, and other publications on literacy education. He has been co-editor of the Journal of Literacy Research and the Yearbook of the National Reading Association. Currently he serves on several editorial boards, including Review of Educational Research, Journal of Educational Psychology, Scientific Studies in Reading, Reading Research Quarterly, Reading Psychology, and Reading & Writing Quarterly: An International Journal. He was a member of the influential National Reading Panel. He also chaired two other federal research review panels, the National Literacy Panel for Language Minority Children and Youth, and the National Early Literacy Panel, and helped author the widely adopted Common Core State Standards. His views are often included on non-profit literacy websites.

== Education ==
Shanahan graduated from Oakland University, Rochester, MI with a degree in Social Science/History in 1972 despite not graduating from high school. He earned a Master of Arts in teaching in reading education in 1974, also from Oakland University. He received his PhD in education from the University of Delaware in 1980.

== Career ==
Shanahan began his professional career as a primary grade teacher in Holly, MI and Swartz Creek, Michigan, where he taught third grade, first grade, and remedial reading. While working on his PhD, he served as a Right to Read consultant in Secretary, MD. Upon completing his PhD, he became an assistant professor in the reading education program at what was then the University of Illinois at Chicago Circle. There he taught undergraduate and graduate level courses in the teaching of reading and did research on reading development and instruction. He later was promoted to the associate professor and professor ranks.

While at the University of Illinois at Chicago (UIC), he founded the UIC Center for Literacy a research and service center serving the city of Chicago. He directed that Center from 1991–2013. He also was director of UIC's Reading, Writing, and Literacy programs (1989-2001), and was chair of the Department of Curriculum and Instruction (2011-2013).

In 2009, he was honored as UIC's Researcher of the Year (Social Sciences) and was awarded the distinguished professor designation in 2012.

In 2001–2002, Shanahan took a leave of absence from the university to become director of reading for the Chicago Public Schools.

Shanahan was elected president of the International Literacy Association (ILA), and served the association in many capacities, including as a board member, vice president, president elect and president of the ILA. In 2014–2015, he was visiting research professor at Queens University, Belfast, Northern Ireland.

== Major topics of research ==
=== Reading-writing relationships ===
The impact of reading on writing is obvious, since writers use the letters, punctuation, grammatical constructions, and discourse organization with which readers would necessarily be familiar. However, empirical study of these relations was sporadic, simple (usually examining only two variables), and were not particularly influential of theory or practice. This situation changed with Shanahan’s multivariate investigations of reading-writing relationships during the 1980s; a period that could accurately be described as the beginning of the modern age of reading-writing research. These early studies have been widely cited, and have been replicated and extended with students with learning disabilities and internationally. Prior to this work, the inclusion of writing within American reading curricula was rare but today most commercial core reading instruction programs include a writing component. Shanahan’s work on reading-writing relationships conceptualized the connections as being multivariate and developmental (changing in nature as students progressed). Although at the time this line of research began it was common to claim that reading and writing were closely related, Shanahan found the relations to be moderate in scope—meaning that reading and writing could influence each other, but also that they would differ in important ways. This means that to accomplish high levels of reading and writing ability, it is essential that both be taught, rather than simply teaching one to accomplish the other. Interactive models of reading and writing in which both variables influence each other are more descriptive of literacy attainment than models in which reading precedes writing or vice versa.

=== Cloze testing ===
Cloze testing refers to the measurement of reading comprehension or readability of texts by having individuals read texts with omitted words. The readers try to use context to replace the missing words and their reading ability or the difficulty of the texts is then inferred from these responses. From the 1950s-1970s, studies of cloze testing were among the five most studied issues in reading education. This changed with the publication of Shanahan’s research on cloze. This research proved that cloze testing was limited in that it measured sentence level comprehension alone, without regard to cohesion, text structure, or other aspects of meaning that go beyond sentence boundaries. As a result, cloze research became less frequent and the use of cloze either as an assessment or instructional tool declined.

=== Research synthesis ===
Shanahan played an important role in the use of research synthesis to drive educational policy. He co-authored an influential synthesis of research on Reading Recovery, a remedial reading program aimed at first graders, at the request of U.S. Department of Education’s North Central Regional Education Laboratory. In 1997, he was selected from 299 nominees to serve as a member of the National Reading Panel. He co-chaired the Methodology and Fluency subcommittees and was a member of the Alphabetics committee. The National Reading Panel report identified evidence supporting the explicit teaching of phonemic awareness, phonics, oral reading fluency, vocabulary, and reading comprehension and became the basis of both federal education policy (No Child Left Behind) and the construction of many commercial reading programs. This report was identified as the third most influential educational report by Editorial Projects in Education Research in 2006. Shanahan also chaired two other federal research review panels: National Early Literacy Panel (NELP) and National Literacy Panel for Language Minority Children and Youth (NLP). Both panels issued influential reports. These panels followed upon the work of the National Reading Panel, focusing on the reading development of children in preschool and kindergarten on those learning to read in a second language. The Institute of Education Sciences of the U.S. Department of Education decided not to issue the NLP report, but allowed its external publication after pressure brought to bear by the New York Times.

=== Disciplinary literacy ===
Each discipline (e.g., literature, science, mathematics, history) creates specialized texts and uses reading and writing in unique or highly specialized ways. Professor Shanahan conducted research and wrote a plethora of reports and reviews on disciplinary literacy, mostly with his wife, Cynthia Shanahan. These studies compare the approaches to reading used by mathematicians, historians, and chemists, and explore how these specialized uses of literacy could be taught in secondary schools. This work became the basis of the disciplinary literacy standards included in the Common Core State Standards, which have been adopted by more than 40 U.S. states; additionally, several other countries and international organizations are supporting research and practice in disciplinary literacy, explicitly based on the Shanahan’s work. In 2017, the Literacy Research Association recognized these contributions with the P. David Pearson Award for Scholarly Impact.

== Testimony in federal court cases ==
Shanahan has been an expert witness in a number of legal proceedings focusing on educational practice, educational policy, and document readability. In two instances his opinions have been cited in federal case law. In one case, the Sargent Shriver Center for Poverty Law brought a class action suit on behalf of the minor children in Cook County, Illinois who were eligible for Medicaid against the State of Illinois. The suit claimed that the state was failing to ensure that the plaintiffs were receiving the required pediatric care and services. One concern was the reading demands of notices that were sent to the parents of these Medicaid eligible children. Shanahan testified that the notices were more difficult than necessary and often exceeded the reading levels of the parents and guardians. District Judge Joan Lefkow cited his opinion in ordering that the state employ communications specialists capable of producing easier to understand notices and that parents be told, not just informed in writing, of the services available.

In another case Governor Bobby Jindal of Louisiana brought suit against the U.S. Department of Education and U.S. Secretary of Education Arne Duncan. Governor Jindal claimed that the Department of Education coerced the states to adopt the Common Core State Standards in violation of the U.S. Constitution, the Department of Education charter, and states’ rights. Shanahan served as expert witness on behalf of the U.S. Department of Education and testified that the Common Core did not constitute a curriculum and that, therefore, the U.S. Department of Education was not in violation. Judge Shelly Dick concurred, citing Shanahan's testimony in her ruling.

== Awards and honors ==
- P. David Pearson Scholarly Impact Award, Literacy Research Association, 2017
- Outstanding Academic Title List (Early Childhood Literacy), Choice Magazine, 2013
- Distinguished Achievement Award for Learned Article, Association of Educational Publishers, 2013
- Inductee, University of Delaware Wall of Fame, 2013
- William S. Gray Citation of Merit, International Reading Association, 2013
- Literacy Award, LEADER (IRA Special Interest Group), 2013
- Distinguished professor, University of Illinois at Chicago, 2012
- Researcher of the Year – Humanities and Social Sciences, University of Illinois at Chicago, 2009
- Inductee, Reading Hall of Fame, 2007
- Member, Illinois Reading Hall of Fame, 2002
- Recipient, Albert J. Harris Award for Outstanding Research on Reading Disability, International Reading Association, 1997
- Recipient, University of Delaware Presidential Citation for Outstanding Achievement, 1994
- Recipient, Milton D. Jacobson Readability Research Award, Readability Spe¬cial Interest Group, International Reading Association, 1983.
- Recipient, Amoco Outstanding Teaching Award, Amoco Foundation, 1982
- Recipient, Silver Circle Award for Teaching, University of Illinois at Chicago Circle, 1982

== Publications ==
- Pikulski, J. J. & Shanahan, T. (Eds.). (1982). Approaches to the informal evaluation of reading. Newark, DE: International Reading Association.
- Kamil, M. L.; Langer, J.; & Shanahan, T. (1985). Understanding reading and writing research. Boston: Allyn & Bacon.
- Shanahan, T. (Ed.). (1990). Reading and writing together: New perspectives for the classroom. Norwood, MA: Christopher Gordon.
- Shanahan, T. (Ed.). (1994). Teachers Thinking, Teachers Knowing. Urbana, IL: National Conference on Research in English, & National Council of Teachers of Eng¬lish.
- August, D., & Shanahan, T. (Eds.). (2006). Developing literacy in second-language learners. Mahwah, NJ: Lawrence Erlbaum Associates.
- August, D., & Shanahan, T. (Eds.). (2008). Developing reading and writing in second-language learners: Lessons from the Report of the National Literacy Panel on Language-Minority Children and Youth. New York: Routledge.
- Shanahan, T., Callison, K., Carriere, C., Duke, N. K., Pearson, P. D., Schatschneider, C., & Torgesen, J. (2010). Improving reading comprehension in kindergarten through third grade: A practice guide. Washington, DC: National Center for Education Evaluation and Regional Assistance, Institute of Education Sciences, U.S. Department of Education.
- Shanahan, T., & Lonigan, C. (Eds.). (2013). Literacy in preschool and kindergarten children: The National Early Literacy Panel and beyond. Baltimore: Brookes Publishing.
- Morrow, L. M., Shanahan, T., & Wixson, K. (2013). Teaching with Common Core State Standards for English Language Arts, PreK-2. New York: Guilford Publications.
- Shanahan, T. (2015). Relationships between reading and writing development. In C A. MacArthur, Steve Graham, & Jill Fitzgerald (Eds.), Handbook of writing research (2nd ed., pp. 194–210). New York: The Guilford Press.
- Shanahan, C., & Shanahan, T. (2018). Disciplinary literacy. In D. Lapp & D. Fisher (Eds.), Handbook of research on teaching the English Language Arts (4th ed., pp. 281–308). New York: Routledge.
- Shanahan, T. (2019). Reading-writing connections. In S. Graham, C.A. MacArthur, & M. Hebert (Eds.), Best practices in writing instruction (3rd ed., pp. 309–332). New York: Guilford Press.
- Shanahan, T. (2025). Leveled reading, leveled lives. Cambridge, MA: Harvard Education Press.
