= National Reading Panel =

United States government body

The National Reading Panel (NRP) was a United States government body. Formed in 1997 at the request of Congress, it was a national panel with the stated aim of assessing the effectiveness of different approaches used to teach children to read.

The panel was created by Director of the National Institute of Child Health and Human Development (NICHD) at the National Institutes of Health, in consultation with the United States Secretary of Education, and included prominent experts in the fields of reading education, psychology, and higher education. The panel was chaired by Donald Langenberg (University of Maryland), and included the following members: Gloria Correro (Mississippi State U.), Linnea Ehri (City University of New York), Gwenette Ferguson (middle school teacher, Houston, TX), Norma Garza (parent, Brownsville, TX), Michael L. Kamil (Stanford U.), Cora Bagley Marrett (U. Massachusetts-Amherst), S. J. Samuels (U. of Minnesota), Timothy Shanahan (educator) (U. of Illinois at Chicago), Sally Shaywitz (Yale U.), Thomas Trabasso (U. of Chicago), Joanna Williams (Columbia U.), Dale Willows (U. Of Toronto), Joanne Yatvin (school district superintendent, Boring, OR).

In April 2000, the panel issued its report, "Teaching Children to Read," and completed its work. The report summarized research in eight areas relating to literacy instruction: phonemic awareness instruction, phonics instruction, fluency instruction, vocabulary instruction, text comprehension instruction, independent reading, computer assisted instruction, and teacher professional development. The final report was endorsed by all of the panel members except one. Joanne Yatvin wrote a minority report criticizing the work of the NRP because it (a) did not include teachers of early reading on the panel or as reviewers of the report and (b) only focused on a subset of important reading skills. Timothy Shanahan, another panel member, later responded that Dr. Yatvin had received permission to investigate areas of reading instruction that the panel could not address within the limited time provided for their work. Shanahan noted that she had not pursued additional areas of interest despite the willingness of the panel to allow her to do so.

In 2001, President George W. Bush announced that the report would be the basis of federal literacy policy and was used prominently to craft Reading First, a $5 billion federal reading initiative that was part of the No Child Left Behind legislation.

== Phonemic awareness ==
The NRP said results from phonemic awareness (PA) instruction were "positive" and helped students in kindergarten and grade one to improve their reading, spelling and comprehension, regardless of their socioeconomic status (SES). However, disabled readers did not benefit in spelling.

The report clearly specified that the most effective manner of teaching PA was to include it with letters and the manipulation of phonemes (i.e. segmenting and blending with phonics), rather than limiting it to speech.

== Phonics instruction ==
The NRP reviewed 38 studies on the teaching of phonics and found that teaching children the relationship between letters and spelling patterns and pronunciation and how to decode words improved reading achievement. Young children who received such instruction did better with decoding words, nonsense words, spelling, fluency, and reading comprehension. Older disabled readers also benefited from such instruction in terms of improvement in decoding, but without commensurate gains in spelling or reading comprehension. Systematic phonics instruction — that is instruction based on a planned curriculum — was found to be superior to more opportunistic versions in which teachers tried to teach what they thought students needed. There were no statistical differences between synthetic phonics programs in which each letter sound is taught versus analytic phonics that analyzes the sounds within complete words.

Finally, the panel emphasized that "phonics should not become the dominant component" and "should be integrated with other reading instruction to create a balanced reading program".

== Oral Reading Fluency ==
The NRP analyzed 16 studies showing that teaching oral reading fluency led to improvements in word reading, fluency, and reading comprehension for students in grades 1–4, and for older students with reading problems. Instruction that had students reading texts aloud, with repetition and feedback led to clear learning benefits.

== Encouraging Students to Read ==
The report examined the research of the efficacy of reading tracking programs like Accelerated Reader on students reading outcomes. There was no effect on the program after 6 weeks of use on student's reading fluency. The panelists pointed to this an area for further study; they could not demonstrate the efficacy of encouraging silent reading through incentive programs on student's reading outcomes.

== Vocabulary and Comprehension Strategy Instruction ==
Comprehension instruction includes several factors including vocabulary instruction which is a key to learning the connection between oral speaking, reading and writing, and comprehension. The NRP concluded that a variety of vocabulary instruction methods can be effective, although it was unable to recommend any single method. However, it suggested that vocabulary instruction should be both direct and indirect, and include repetition, exposures in different media, and rich contexts.

It was also evident that teaching students how to think about the ideas in text can improve reading comprehension. Particularly powerful in this regard were teaching students to summarize the information that they had read, or having them ask (and answer) questions about the ideas. Additionally, it was also beneficial to guide students to do the following, a) monitor their comprehension, essentially paying attention to whether they were understanding during reading and taking some kind of action if they were not, b) use their prior knowledge, c) visualize the information described in text, or d) think about the structure of a text through story mapping.

The NRP suggested there is a need for greater emphasis in teacher education on the teaching of reading comprehension.

== Computer Technology and Reading Instruction ==
Of the hundreds of studies including computer technology, only 5% met the standards of the NRP so they concluded that more research is required before they can make any recommendations.

== Critiques and responses ==
On January 8, 2020, a review was published questioning the evidence used to support the effectiveness of systematic phonics, including the evidence in the National Reading Panel. The author of the analysis says they are not suggesting that "grapheme-phoneme correspondences" is unimportant, only that there is "little or no empirical evidence that systematic phonics leads to better reading outcomes".

In August of 2017, Timothy Shanahan (a member of the panel) says there is still reason to accept the conclusions of the NRP, saying: "It is still a good idea to explicitly teach kids to hear the sounds within words (phonemic awareness), to decode (phonics), to read text aloud accurately, with appropriate speed, and with expression (fluency), to know the meanings of words, and to use reading strategies when reading text in order to understand it better (reading comprehension)".

In 2008, the National Council of teachers of English published a guide that teachers can use to apply the findings of the NRP.

In 2003, Timothy Shanahan (a member of the panel) wrote an article entitled Research-based reading instruction: Myths about the National Reading Panel report in which he discusses 10 myths about the NRP.
