= Independent review of the teaching of early reading (Rose Report 2006) =

Government of England report on reading

The Independent review of the teaching of early reading was an influential independent review by Sir Jim Rose, former HMI director of inspection at Ofsted, into the teaching of reading in primary schools in England.

Another report was published in April 2009, with the name Independent Review of the Primary Curriculum: Final Report, after additional evidence was received from the Cambridge Primary Review.

Both reports recommended that high quality systematic phonics "should be taught as the prime approach in learning to decode (to read) and encode (to write/spell) print". Phonics should be taught systematically and discretely, however, it should be set within a "broad and rich" multisensory curriculum. The reports stressed the importance of language development (including speaking and listening). The reports also recommended that the "searchlights" model of reading should be replaced with the simple view of reading.

== See also ==
- The National Strategies
- Phonics
- Primary National Strategy
- Reading
- Synthetic phonics
- Rose, Jim (2006). "Independent review of the teaching of early reading" (PDF). Department for Education and Skills. Archived from the original (PDF) on 21 March 2013.
