= Annemarie Palincsar =

American educational psychologist

- Occupation: Ann L. Brown Distinguished University Professor Emerita
- Awards: Oscar Causey Award for Outstanding Contributions to Reading Research (2005); P. David Pearson Award for Scholarly Influence (2019)

Academic background
- Education: University of Illinois

Academic work
- Discipline: Educational Studies
- Institutions: University of Michigan

Annemarie Sullivan Palincsar is a scholar of education known for her research on literacy instruction, reciprocal teaching, and cognitive apprenticeships. Her involvement in the National Academies of Sciences, Engineering, and Medicine Research Council on the Prevention of Reading Difficulty in Young Children, the National Research Council's Panel on Teacher Preparation, and the International Literacy Association's Literacy Research Panel, attests to her dedication to advancing educational research and improving teacher training. Palincsar is the Ann L. Brown Distinguished University Professor Emerita at the Marsal Family School of Education at the University of Michigan.

== Honors and awards ==
- Ann L. Brown Distinguished University Professor (2020)
- P. David Pearson Award for Scholarly Influence (2019)
- Reading Hall of Fame (2018)
- Named Arthur F. Thurnau Professorship (2006)
- Oscar Causey Award for Outstanding Contributions to Reading Research (2005)
- Member, National Academy of Education
- University of Canterbury Fellow (2003)
- AERA Early Career Award for Programmatic Research (1991)

== Biography ==
Palincsar was a first-generation college student. She had interests in becoming a pediatrician, but pursued education instead with a focus on children's learning difficulties. She completed a BA in Special Education at Fitchburg State College in 1972 and an M.S in Special Education at University of Illinois at Urbana-Champaign in 1974. She subsequently became a teacher of grades K–7. While teaching kindergarten students, Palincsar noticed that the children were often unable to talk about the ideas that they were reading about in class. As a special educator, Palincsar did not have the solution to that problem. This challenged her and so she returned to the University of Illinois where she completed her Ph.D. in Education in 1982.

Over her career, Palincsar received numerous awards for her contributions to teacher education, instructional design, teaching and learning in K-8 classrooms, including with the American Education Research Association Early Career Award for Programmatic Research in 1991 and the Oscar Causey Award for Outstanding Contributions to Reading Research in 2005. Within the field of literacy education, Palincsar has been influential in shaping instructional practices and educational policies in the U.S. Her research on improving reading comprehension of students in pre-K to grade 12 was funded through the Institute of Education Sciences.

Palincsar contributed to a National Academies of Sciences, Engineering, and Medicine volume titled How People Learn, Volume II: Learners, Contexts, and Cultures on the science of learning and its implications for education. The volume emphasizes the importance of understanding the social and cultural contexts in which learning occurs, as these factors can significantly influence how individuals learn and the knowledge they acquire. The professional development of teachers is also addressed, with an emphasis on preparing educators to create learner-centered, inclusive, and culturally responsive learning environments. The key findings highlight the complex nature of learning and the need for educators, policymakers, and researchers to consider diverse contexts and individual differences when designing and implementing effective educational strategies.

With P. David Pearson, Palincsar spearheaded the Reading for Understanding research initiative which explored the cognitive processes underlying reading in children from pre-K to grade 12. In their report titled Reaping the Rewards of the Reading for Understanding Initiative, the authors emphasized the importance of enhancing children's language development and the need to equip teachers to assess their students' learning.

Palincsar served as a co-editor of the journal Cognition and Instruction. Prior to her retirement in 2021, Palincar was the Jean and Charles Walgreen Jr. Chair of Reading and Literacy at the University of Michigan.

== Research ==
Palincsar is known for conducting research aimed at improving children's reading comprehension and increasing literacy rates by targeting teaching practices that promote learning strategies for students.

Much of her work has focused on student engagement in the context of traditional classroom settings. She has sought ways to help students think strategically and identify teaching methods that foster students' sense-making and knowledge-building capabilities. She recommends that teachers ask higher order questions to engage their students with the content they are reading. Such questioning can help students visualize what they reading, while also helping teachers to identify gaps in their students' understanding. Through this method, students develop a deeper understanding of the content they are learning and possibly solve more complex problems. Palincsar's emphasis on supporting students in engaging with texts and efforts to foster knowledge building in the context of project-based learning reflect her commitment to effective and innovative teaching practices.

Palincsar's work delves into innovative pedagogical approaches and interventions designed to enhance text comprehension and promote critical thinking and metacognitive skills. Palincsar is widely recognized for her ground-breaking studies on reciprocal teaching. This method, developed in collaboration with Ann Brown, focused on improving reading comprehension by engaging teachers and students in collaborative dialogues that promote a shared responsibility for learning. Reciprocal teaching engages students in the learning process by allowing them to share insights, challenge each other's ideas, and construct meaning collectively. The method encourages students to ask questions, make predictions, and clarify misconceptions, all of which promote critical thinking skills. Reciprocal teaching has had a substantial impact on literacy instruction and has been widely adopted in educational settings.

Palincsar is also recognized for her contributions to the concept of cognitive apprenticeships. This work built on the theoretical work of Lev Vygotsky who emphasized the importance of providing support within a student's ZPD (Zone of Proximal Development), i.e., the range of tasks a learner can perform with the help of a more knowledgeable person. Under Palincsar's view, instructional scaffolding is crucial for guiding students toward independent comprehension. Her work in this area prompted educators and other researchers to explore how mobile technologies can be leveraged to enhance learning experiences, provide personalized instruction, and facilitate collaborative activities.

== Books ==
- Campione, J. C., Metz, K., & Palincsar, A. S. (2007). Children's learning in the laboratory and in the classroom: Essays in honor of Ann Brown. Routledge.
- Deshler, D., Palincsar, A. S., Biancarosa, G., & Naire, M. (2007). Informed choices for struggling adolescent readers: A research based guide to principles and practices. International Reading Association.
- Jones, B. F., Palincsar, A. S., Ogle, D. S., & Carr, E. G. (Ed.) (1987). Strategic teaching and learning: Cognitive instruction in the content areas. Association for Supervision and Curriculum Development.
- Kucan, L. & Palincsar, A. S. (2013). Comprehension instruction through text-based discussion. International Reading Association.
- National Academies of Sciences, Engineering, and Medicine. (2018). How people learn II: Learners, contexts, and cultures. National Academies Press. (Contributing author).
- Palincsar, A. S., Ogle, D. S., Jones, B. B., & Carr, E. G. (1986). Teaching reading as thinking. Association for Supervision and Curriculum Development.
- Pearson, P.D., Palincsar, A.S., Biancarosa, G., Berman, A. (2020). Reaping the rewards of the reading for understanding initiative. National Academy Press.

== Representative papers ==
- Palincsar, A. S., Fitzgerald, M. S., Marcum, M. B., & Sherwood, C.-A. (2018). Examining the work of "scaffolding" in theory and practice: A case study of 6th graders and their teacher interacting with one another, an ambitious science curriculum, and mobile devices. International Journal of Educational Research, 90, 191–208.
- Palincsar, A. S., Marcum, M. B., Fitzgerald, M., & Sherwood, C.-A. (2019). Braiding teacher practice and class-wide dialogue: An historical inquiry across three sociocultural interventions. International Journal of Educational Research, 97, 157–165.
- Palincsar, A. S., & Schleppegrell, M. J. (2014). Focusing on language and meaning while learning with text. TESOL Quarterly, 48(3), 616–623.
- Palincsar, A. S., & Schutz, K. M. (2011). Reconnecting strategy instruction with its theoretical roots. Theory into Practice, 50(2), 85–92.
- Palinscar, A. S. & Brown, A. L. (1984). Reciprocal teaching of comprehension-fostering and comprehension-monitoring activities. Cognition and Instruction, 1(2), 117–175.
