= Ann Brown =

British educational psychologist

Ann Lesley Brown (1943–1999) was an educational psychologist who developed methods for teaching children to be better learners. Her interest in the human memory brought Brown to focus on active memory strategies that would help enhance human memory and developmental differences in memory tasks. Her realization that children's learning difficulties often stem from an inability to use metacognitive strategies such as summarizing led to profound advances in educational psychology theory and teaching practices.

== Biography ==
Brown was born in an air raid shelter in Portsmouth, England, during World War II. She was dyslexic and did not learn to read until she was 13. Just before entering the University of London, she saw a documentary about how animals learn in their natural environments and decided to change majors from history and literature to psychology. Brown received a PhD in psychology from the University of London for research on "Anxiety and Complex Learning Performance in Children." She moved to the United States where she met her husband and collaborator Joseph Campione. Brown received several prestigious awards for her research and served as president of American Educational Research Association.

She died at 56 on June 4, 1999, in San Francisco. She was survived by husband Joseph Campione, son Richard Campione, two brothers Peter and Michael Taylor, and granddaughter Sophia Campione.

In the words of one fifth-grade student quoted by Palincsar (2003):

Ann Brown—she's really very sophisticated. She knows a lot about a lot of things. It's no wonder people picked her to be president of AERA. She's good at organizing and she keeps track of all our work no matter how much we do. She spends a lot of time with kids. Yeah, that's what I like. When she comes to school she spends time with the kids instead of the adults. She listens to make sure that we have learned. To tell you the truth, she really is a big help. She makes you feel so proud of yourself. You know, your self-confidence gets better.

== Contributions in educational research ==
Through her research, Brown and her colleagues hypothesized that some metacognitive strategies, such as general problem solving routines like summarizing and self-testing, had advantages over other strategies i.e. mnemonic instruction. Instead of recalling relative meaningless material, studies moved towards connecting the material, which allowed Brown to move towards further research in text comprehension.

Brown also worked with Annemarie Sullivan Palincsar to develop the reciprocal teaching method, in which teachers and students take turns leading structured discussions of text.

Brown also pioneered the use of Design-based research in educational studies. Brown used the approach to study student learning in realistic classroom environments, rather than in controlled laboratory settings.

=== Fostering Community of Learners ===
Fostering Community of Learners (FCL) was a program launched by Brown along with her husband Joseph Campione while at the University of California, Berkeley. The project was noted to be similar to earlier reform methods such as progressive education, and discovery learning. Critics questioned how Brown and Campione's project of FCL would differ from Dewey and perhaps succeed where Dewey did not. Brown and Campione assure that while the approaches to the FCL project are similar to Dewey's early works, there are also differences. The approach to the project was to create a program that met between the theories of discovery learning and didactic learning. According to Brown and Campione, discovery learning that was unguided could potentially be dangerous, while didactic study led to passive learners. Therefore, Brown and Campione's approach of "guided discovery" was the middle ground between the two.

Brown and Campione led FCL classes in schools in the Bay Area. In FCL, students were encouraged to design their own learning through a curriculum they prepared themselves therefore acting as collaborative researchers. A teacher, or guide, is then responsible for modeling, fostering, and guiding the process of discovery into forms of disciplined examination. The project also utilized reciprocal teaching, which allowed students to study and share their expertise with a group and discuss material they have prepared themselves. The curriculum of a FCL classroom was a key feature to the program. Depending on the curricula, the classroom activity fostered various themes and units that aided in the further development of the student. Biological themes included interdependence and adaptation while environmental science themes included balance, competition, and cooperation.

Through the Brown and Campione team, the FCL research enhanced the interaction between classroom and laboratory research. Research conducted in a laboratory allowed a better understanding of the developmental patterns demonstrated by children and in turn gave rise to classroom observations in which hypotheses could be systematically explore in relatively controlled environments.

== Works ==
- Palincsar, A.S., & Brown, A.L. (1984). Reciprocal teaching of comprehension-fostering and comprehension-monitoring activities. Cognition and Instruction, 1(2), 117–175. (159 Citations, PsycINFO)
- Brown, A.L. (1992). Design experiments: Theoretical and methodological challenges in creating complex interventions in classroom settings. The Journal of the Learning Sciences, 2(2), 141–178. (147 Citations, PsycINFO)
- Brown, A.L., & Campione, J.C. (1994). Guided discovery in a community of learners. In K. McGilly (Ed.), Classroom lessons: Integrating cognitive theory and classroom practice. Cambridge, MA: MIT Press/Bradford Books.
- Brown, A.L., & Campione, J.C. (1996). Psychological theory and the design of innovative learning environments: On procedures, principles, and systems. In L. Schauble & R. Glaser (Eds.), Innovations in learning: New environments for education (pp. 289–325). Mahwah, NJ: Erlbaum.

== See also ==
- Design-based research

Educational offices
Preceded by Elliot Eisner	President of the American Educational Research Association; 1993–1994	Succeeded by Jane Stallings
