= Gradual release of responsibility =

Style of teaching

The gradual release of responsibility (GRR) model is a structured method of pedagogy centred on devolving responsibility within the learning process from the teacher to the learner. This approach requires the teacher to initially take on all the responsibility for a task, transitioning in stages to the students assuming full independence in carrying it out. The goal is to cultivate confident learners and thinkers who are capable of handling tasks even in areas where they have not yet gained expertise.

== Theory ==
While similar models have been identified and represented throughout the study and development of teaching and learning as a construct, it was P. David Pearson and Margaret C. Gallagher (1983) who coined the phrase "gradual release of responsibility" to describe this dynamic in the classroom. Loosely basing their model on the ideas of the Russian educational theorist Lev Vygotsky, Pearson and Gallagher envisioned instruction that moved from explicit modeling and instruction to guided practice and then to activities that incrementally positioned students into becoming independent learners. The teacher guides the students to a point of 'planned obsolescence' on the part of the teacher "...where the student accepts total responsibility for the task, including the responsibility for determining whether or not she is applying the strategy appropriately (i.e, self monitoring)."

One element which is crucial to the success of the GRR model is the notion related to 'instructional scaffolding', which is grounded in Vygotsky's concept of the "zone of proximal development" (ZPD). This is described as the distance between the actual developmental level of a learner as determined by their independent problem solving abilities and the level of potential development through problem-solving under adult guidance or in collaboration with more capable peers. That is, the distance between what the children can do without assistance and what they can accomplish with the assistance of more capable peers. The zone of proximal development can be applied as an umbrella over the entire GRR model. Students are given support in the form of scaffolding and differentiate instruction throughout all four phases of the process. Teachers may offer more challenging material to high-achieving students, and assist lower-achieving students in needs-based groups. Teachers will support students as needed throughout all four steps finally allowing for the eventual independence of each student. The GRR model "...assumes that [the student] will need some guidance in reaching that stage of independence and that it is precisely the teacher's role to provide such guidance".

Vygotsky (1978) believed that guided interactions, with an adult, or a more skilled peer, could facilitate a higher level of thinking within the zone. In Vygotsky's theory, this person is referred to as the "More Knowledgeable Other (MKO)". The four phases of the GRR Model are: Focus Lesson – "I do it", Guided Instruction – "We do it", Collaborative – "You do it together", and Independent – "You do it alone" (Fisher & Frey 2006). In the GRR model, the MKO exists in the person of the teacher-guide in the "I do it" and "We do it" phases. The MKO resurfaces again in the collaborative process where peers may assist each other as expertise, personal experience, and/or understanding allows.

There have been a number of ways of describing and representing the ways in which adults or more experienced others may assist novice learners within their ZPD. Rogoff (1990) recognised that this could be achieved through guided participation, and this is similar to the concept of Tharp and Gallimore's theory (1991), of "means of assisting" and to that of the practice of reciprocal teaching recognised by Brown and Palincsar. Others have recognised the similarities between this method of instruction and the integrated approach of collaboration in conceptual change (Rochelle, 1992) and the cognitive apprenticeship model of Collins, Brown, and Newman (1989).

This term 'scaffolding' is a useful metaphor that is used to symbolise the process of supporting a learner in the early stages of the learning process – as the walls get higher – until there is sufficient evidence of knowledge and skills having been acquired, to then be able to remove that scaffolding so the learner is able to 'stand alone', or be effectively independent enough to continue learning 'alone'. In a similar way, there is a gradual dismantling of the scaffolding as the 'job' becomes more secure and so there is a gradual release of responsibility from the teacher to the learner. As scaffolding is temporary, so too are the lessons that are constructed to help students as they embark into unfamiliar thinking. As noted by Pearson and Gallagher, "The critical stage of the model is the 'guided practice,' the stage in which the teacher gradually releases task responsibility to the students." As such, these lessons eventually fade away as students become gradually more comfortable with the learning and are able to work without the necessary guidance of the teacher.

Although based on the work of Piaget, the influence of Vygotsky's 'constructivist theory' and learning in the classroom has become more popular because it considers the influence of group processes and social contexts that are, in themselves, influenced by such constructs as cultural diversity and stages of development.

The GRR model emphasizes instruction that supports and mentors students into becoming capable thinkers and learners when handling tasks in which they have yet to develop expertise. It is a successful model and has been documented as an effective approach in teaching many subject areas and a variety of content, from writing achievement, reading comprehension, and literacy outcomes for English language learners (Kong & Pearson, 2003).

== The four phases ==
=== Focused lesson ===
Focus lessons are a time for students to hear the teacher and not answer questions about their own thinking. This is the time for students to actively listen, take notes and ask for clarification. "I think...", or "I wonder...", or "I predict...." are the types of statements students will hear.

According to Fisher and Frey, Modeling follows a precise pattern:

1. Name the strategy, skill, or task
2. State the purpose of the strategy, skill or task
3. Explain when the strategy or skill is used
4. Use analogies to link prior knowledge to new learning
5. Demonstrate how the skill, strategy, or task is completed
6. Alert learners about errors to avoid
7. Assess the use of the new skill

"Once students have a skill or strategy modeled, they gain a deeper understanding for when to apply it, what to watch for, and how to analyze their success." Students can then be given time to talk and practice with a partner. Students need to be provided with examples for them to be successful.

"The key to a quality focus lesson is in the direct explaining and modeling of the skill, strategies, and task."

=== Guided instruction ===
The goal of guided instruction in the gradual release of responsibility model is to guide students toward using different skills, strategies and procedures independently. The student will assume more responsibility with less support from the teacher. Lessons are created as to ensure student success. Oftentimes when students are struggling with a concept in the classroom, they do not need more teacher modelling, what they really need is guidance and support to meet high expectations.

Teachers meet with needs based groups which are created based on the feedback from formative assessment with the aim being for students to progress toward completing the outcome or skill independently. Formative assessments are planned in accordance with specific outcomes, which make it easier for teachers to group students. Groups may change frequently and are not static groups for the entire school year. Student groups change throughout the year based on assessed performance and not on teacher perceived ability. Each group has a purpose and the teacher plans instructional lessons based on the common needs of the group. Guided instruction gives the teacher an opportunity to differentiated instruction small group instruction, vary the level of prompting and also vary the end product. The teacher must be flexible since the instructional goal of the group may change throughout the sessions.

In a classroom there may be many different guided instruction groups. Each group may be working on a different skill or at a different level. Fisher's model recommends meeting with groups 1–3 times per week, with some groups meeting more frequently and other stronger groups meeting less often. The size of the groups will also vary depending on how much face time is required for the particular skill. It is a common misconception that guided instruction is only for struggling students. This is an opportunity for teachers to provide enrichment for strong students. Guided instruction is based on the pedagogical principles of scaffolding.

A study by Conklin and Wilkins shows growth and advances in reading levels among elementary students when using a guided reading approach. Working with the teacher in small groups gave students a chance to work on specific skills, at their reading level. Students gained confidence when reading 'just right' texts. Since they were not struggling with the text they were able to develop vocabulary, reading comprehension skills and oral language skills. Gabl, Kaiser, Long and Roemer found similar results when providing reading intervention in the form of guided reading groups to grade two and grade four students. The results showed an increase in reading fluency and comprehension after using flexible grouping in guided reading.

Improvement in writing can also be seen when teachers implement a guided writing aspect to their literacy based lessons. Gibson notes that providing immediate instructional scaffolding to specific groups of students increases performance. The teacher chooses the instructional goals based on observation and formative assessment. Regardless of subject matter, students who are taught and then grouped according to need and re-taught based on their needs commonly show improvement.

=== Collaborative learning ===
Collaborative learning is the third component of the gradual release of responsibility model where students work in small heterogeneous groups on activities that allow them to deepen their understanding through application of the concept being learned. This stage of the model is the beginning of the transfer of responsibility from the teacher to the students. The collaborative learning component requires that each student is accountable for their participation by producing an independent product while engaged with his peers.

There are five key features of collaborative or cooperative learning that researchers have found essential to produce effective learning. They are positive interdependence, face-to-face interaction, individual and group accountability, interpersonal and small group skills, and group processing. Positive interdependence within a collaborative learning environment means that each member of the group contributes an individual effort to the task which is necessary for the whole group's success. The interdependence of this structure creates an environment in which all individuals are important to the group as a whole, and the sharing of understandings, processes and ideas among members is common.

Face-to-face interaction is another key component of collaborative learning where students interact within their group about their task, providing support, encouragement and praise as needed to reach the goal. In the face to face groups students can check understanding through discussions of the concepts and ideas of the content being studied.

Individual and group accountability requires that each member of the collaborative group be responsible for contributing their share of the work. This can be done with clear goals, and assessment that is measurable in terms of achieving goals and the efforts of the group members.

Collaborative or cooperative learning requires students to act as a members of a team. A skill set that includes leadership, active listening, decision making, turn taking and trust making are useful in collaborative learning. These teamwork skills need to be purposely taught as part of the gradual release of responsibility model.

The final key of collaborative learning is group processing. This refers to the members reflecting on how they are as a group reaching the collaborative learning task, and how as individuals they are learning. Reflection on the workings of the group, what worked and what improvements could be made is also a part of the group processing.

=== Independent tasks ===
The last phase of gradual release of responsibility provides students with the opportunity to employ what they have learned in a new situation. Students can be given a variety of independent tasks but the assignments should reflect the other phases of instructional content. While students are working, the teacher's role is to circulate the room listening and making observations.

Due to time restrictions in the classroom, independent work must be completed by the student at home. According to the Nova Scotia Department of Education, homework is "an assigned activity that students complete outside of regular class time. When assignments are purposeful, engaging, of high quality, and given in moderation, the assignment of homework by teachers is positively associated with student learning success".

Research by Harris Cooper, Jorgianne C. Robinson, and Erika A. Patall has proven, "with only rare exceptions, the relationship between the amount of homework students do and their achievement outcomes was found to be positive and statistically significant". In a survey sponsored by MetLife, the majority of teachers surveyed said they used homework to "improve skills in the classroom and for improving life skills beyond high school".

==== Benefits of homework ====
Studies have shown that classroom instruction and homework can complement one another to result in deeper understanding and improved skills. The Nova Scotia Department of Education provides the following recommendation for maximum daily homework for all subjects:

Grade Level	Maximum Homework Time, 4 Nights / Week
4	20–30 mins.
5	30–40 mins.
6	40–50 mins.
7	60 mins.
8	60 mins.
9	90 mins.
10	90 mins.
11	120 mins.
12	120 mins.

Some strategies suggested for students to start self-monitoring and recording of time spent on homework. Douglas Fisher and Nancy Frey use their research to create a four tiered progression of how homework can benefit students throughout their learning process:

1. Fluency Building – A reading assignment related to the day's instructional material allows for the focus on one or two skills.
2. Application – Students benefit from being asked to apply their newly gained knowledge independently after initial practice in the classroom.
3. Spiral Review – Allows students to apply a number of skills learned in the not so recent past to prepare for major summative assessments. This enables students to develop more confidence and efficiency with material as long as students are able to "organize factual knowledge into larger core concepts".
4. Extension – This takes the form of applying mastered knowledge cross-circularly or over many topics.

==== Problems with homework ====
Homework is problematic when teachers' observations from the independent phase are not employed when determining how much and what kinds of expectations will be placed on students to accomplish for the next class. There is a concern that homework tasks are assigned prematurely in the instructional process and as a result, students learn things incorrectly. This is extremely problematic since it takes even more time to unlearn misconceptions and misunderstandings.

The Nova Scotia Department of Education states that "students learn to assume responsibility for the independent completion of homework through a process of successive and structured release of responsibility. It is therefore important that homework assignments are geared to the realities of students' developing skills to avoid undue frustration and disengagement."

In the same survey sponsored by MetLife, 26% of secondary teachers said they often assign homework due to time restrictions which Fisher and Frey suggest to be problematic because this implies that students are regularly given homework assignments for which they are not adequately prepared.

Homework can be a meaningful part of the independent phase of learning when administered thoughtfully based on the observations made during the independent phase of the gradual release of responsibility framework.

Giving homework early in the morning can often distract students during lessons later in the day. Instead of focusing on the task at hand, many are attempting to finish their homework before it is time to go home. Historically, homework has been seen as a means to improve academic achievement (Lacina-Gifford & Gifford, 2004), discipline the mind (Wildman, 1968), and help children become lifelong learners (Bembenutty, 2011). It has been argued that higher levels of homework and discipline are two reasons why private schools have more successful learning environments than public schools (Coleman, Hoffer, & Kilgore, 1982). This implies that if public schools assigned more homework and had higher levels of discipline, they would increase learning and foster educational discipline in students. A study from 1988 examines the role and outcome of various homework approaches in an elementary school setting. It was found that "low achievement in reading and mathematics, in comparison with high achievement, is associated with more time spent doing homework, more minutes of parent help, and more frequent requests from teachers for parent involvement."
