= Konini School =

School in West Auckland, New Zealand

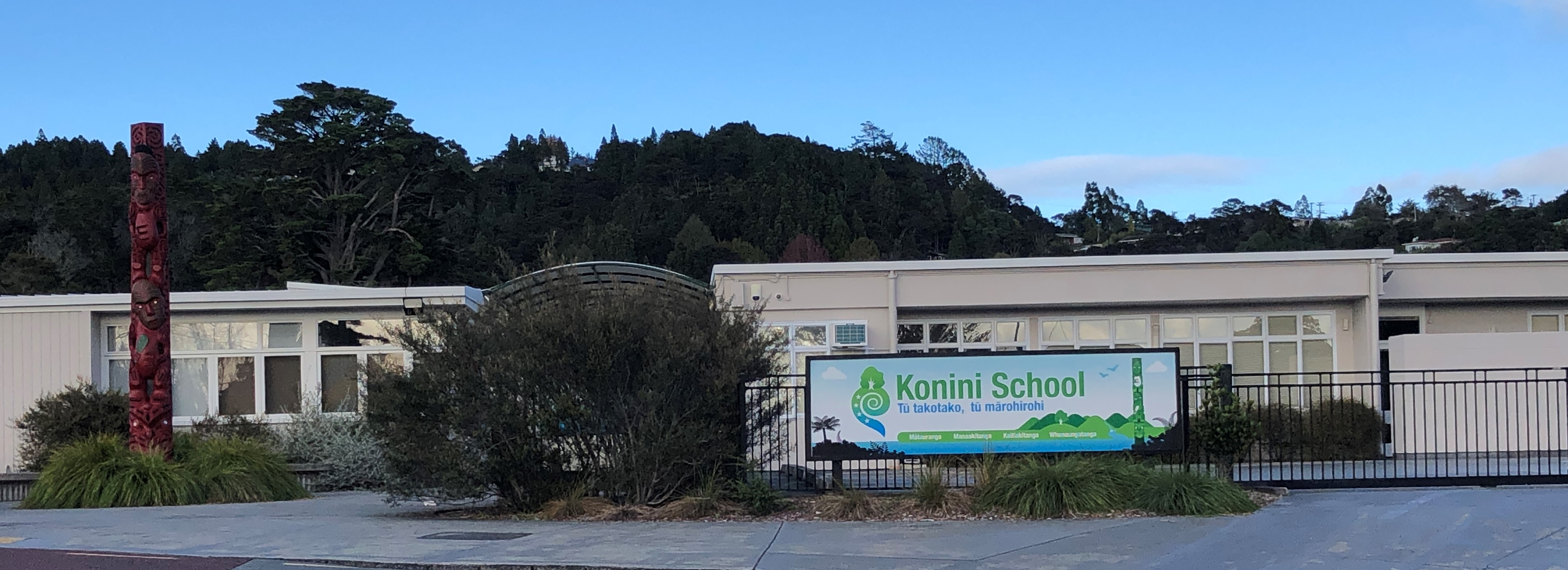

Location
- 73 Withers Road, Auckland; 36.9269852915°S 174.642281891°E

Information
- Type: State, Co-educational, Primary, Contributing (Year 1–6)
- Motto: Learning to Learn: Adapting, Creating, Reflecting Akona kia matou kia taea nga ahuatanga katoa
- Established: 1976
- Ministry of Education Institution no.: 1335
- Principal: Andrew Ducat
- Enrolment: 412 (July 2026)
- Socio-economic decile: 6
- Website: www.konini.school.nz

Konini School is a co-educational state public primary school located in the West Auckland suburb of Konini, New Zealand. Established in 1976, the school educates year 1–6 students and has an enrolment zone in place. The school is situated in the foothills of the Waitākere Ranges on an 8.5-hectare site, of which more than half is a bush reserve, a stream and a waterfall with rock faces that house glow worms. This has meant that students are provided with onsite learning experiences that have shaped the curriculum and resulted in projects to maintain the environment. The school has collaborated with the local community and Auckland Council to support these programmes and develop amenities and facilities.

== Early history ==
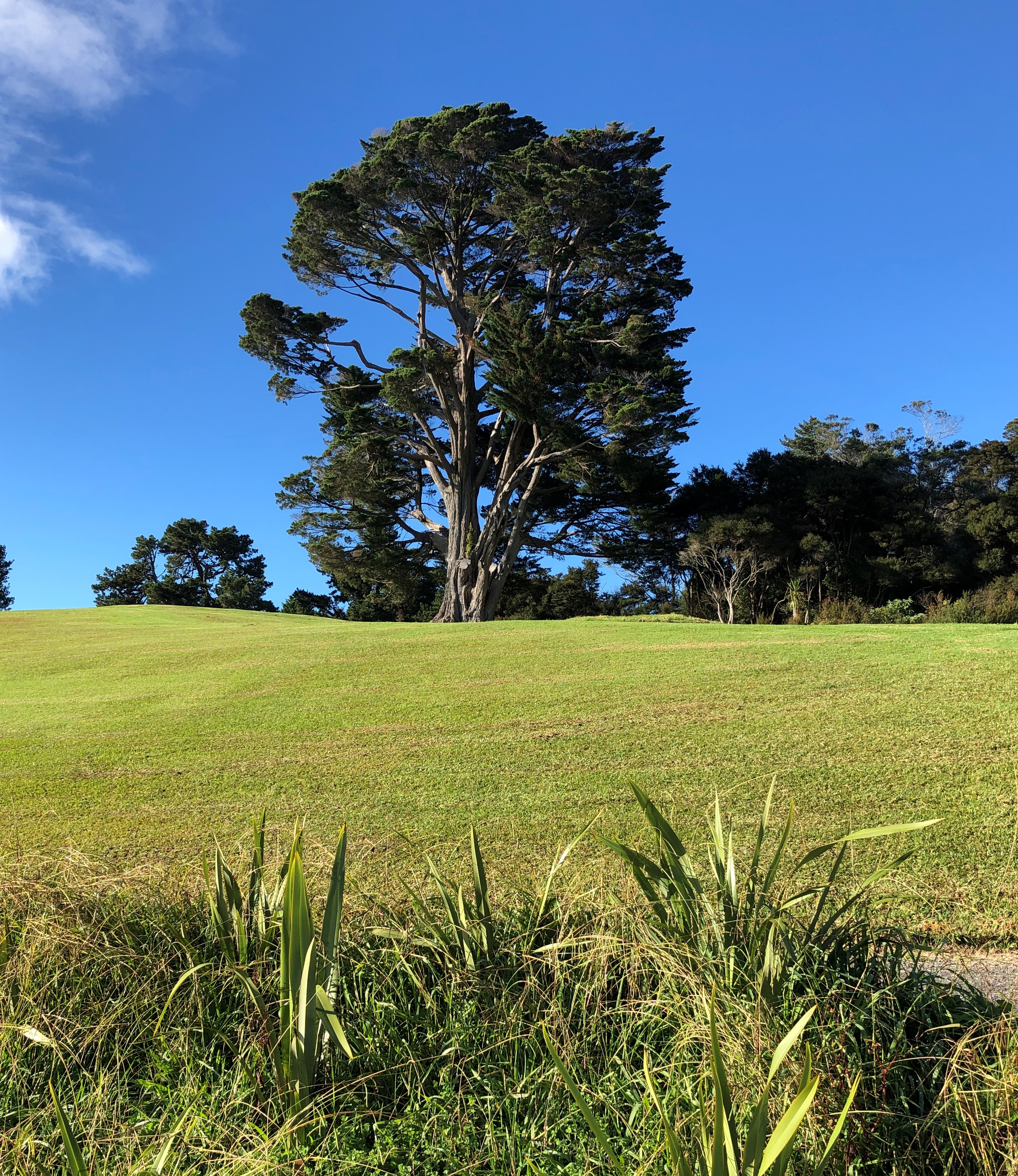
Story tree on the grounds of Konini School

The school opened on 24 May 1976 and stands on what was previously a farmlet, called Pinehurst, owned by Walter Jowitt until he died in 1953. The property was originally an orchard with several paddocks for dairy cows, shelter belts of pine trees and a macrocarpa, which remains on the property and is known as the "story tree". When the school opened it had less than its planned roll, said to be because the construction of a nearby housing estate was behind schedule, the opening being in the middle of the year and apprehension about the 'open plan' of the school. The founding members of the staff were J.I. West (Principal), P. Buffett (Deputy Principal), Mrs Neill, Mrs Noakes, Mr Stacey, Mrs Greenway, Mrs Smith and Mrs Daley. In the first newsletter for parents, the principal said that the semi-open structure of the school [combined]... "the best of the conventional older type schools with the latest in architectural design and equipment". He explained that Konini was "designed on the basis of eight interlocking classrooms, each with specially designed entrances tiled, to double as art and craft areas joining the carpeted teaching rooms". West had earlier told the Western Leader that the plan "had several advantages...[and]...the fact that there are no divisions between every two classrooms, means that children are not artificially penned in, while an experienced teacher may aid a less experienced teacher in an adjoining classroom".

The school held its first gala in March 1977. It was noted that some of the attractions for the day could include hot rod cars, the local Fire Brigade, parachuting, model aeroplanes, gymnastics, a display of cars and bikes and the pony club.

At the inaugural meeting of the Parent Teachers Association (P.T.A) held on 21 June 1977, R. Pirovich was elected as president and a Wine & Cheese evening was confirmed for 20 July. Other items discussed included a Guy Fawkes evening, an athletics day and a project to work on the front garden.

The school appointed a librarian in 1978 and held its first school camp in that year.

In 1979 the New Zealand Woman's Weekly published an article on whether or not children were coming to school well-nourished. While there was some debate about this, the principal of Konini School said in the article that each week they purchased oranges directly from orchards as an "extra service to parents...and if their children forget their lunches, we can let them have oranges".

== Principals ==
West was followed as principal by Jack Gledhill who remained in that position until 1986. Judy Bock took over in 1987 and was principal until Ralph Mayn was appointed in January 1997. Mayn retired at the end of 2000 and was acknowledged for the work he had done with the local principals' association, and by Jan Peach, the chair of the Board of Trustees, for challenging the school with his ideas, [achieving]... "in four years what most would have done in 10".

Prior to a teaching career of almost 40 years, including a previous post as principal at Dunedin North Intermediate school, Barry Hambleton was appointed as principal at Konini School in 2001. He brought particular interests in information technology, literacy and numeracy and was also involved in developing the health and physical education learning areas of the New Zealand Curriculum. Hambleton was an executive member of the New Zealand Principals Federation and noted that due to the changes in education at the time following implementations of the recommendations of the Picot task force, this umbrella body provided key support for principals to manage this process. He later expressed concern about how a change in government policy at the time to reduce junior class numbers would impact staffing numbers.

Michael Malins was principal from 2011 until the end of term 2, 2016, when he was succeeded by Andrew Ducat, who as of June 2022, remains in that position.

The school celebrated its 25th anniversary in 2001 and present was the principal at the time, Barry Hambelton and his predecessors Jack Gledhill, Judy Bock and Ralph Mayn.

== The arts ==
The Drop Dead Gorgeous Show was held in 2000 and although it was originally planned for only one night, extra performances were needed due to the high demand for VIP seats. The costumes for the fashion show were judged by local celebrities Angela Bloomfield of Shortland Street, New Zealand Woman's Weekly fashion editor Tracey Dalton and former model Jason Dye. Organising teachers, Haley Richardson and Carolyn Dye said the "children have been behind the scenes organising everything from a management team and nine designers to the sets and appropriate music for the models".

A celebrity Art Auction was held to raise funds for the school in 2005. Ex-School Committee members Bob Harvey and Tim Shadbolt, plus actors Shane Cortese, Jay Laga'aia and Craig Parker, and cricketer Daniel Vettori were among the celebrities who donated art work to the auction. A student, Tyler Rebers also contributed work and said he "really enjoyed doing the background with the dye". The money raised was used to purchase uniforms for the school's kapa haka group.

== Facilities ==
As the school moved toward more information communication technology (I.C.T.) in the curriculum, the board of trustees purchased laptops for the students in 2001. These computers were seen by the principal as a "big step forward...[allowing]...networking throughout the school and students e-mail access".

When the school notified Waitakere City Council that their flag had fallen into disrepair, council staff said that it was important for students to be proud of their country and in 2002, presented Konini with a new one.

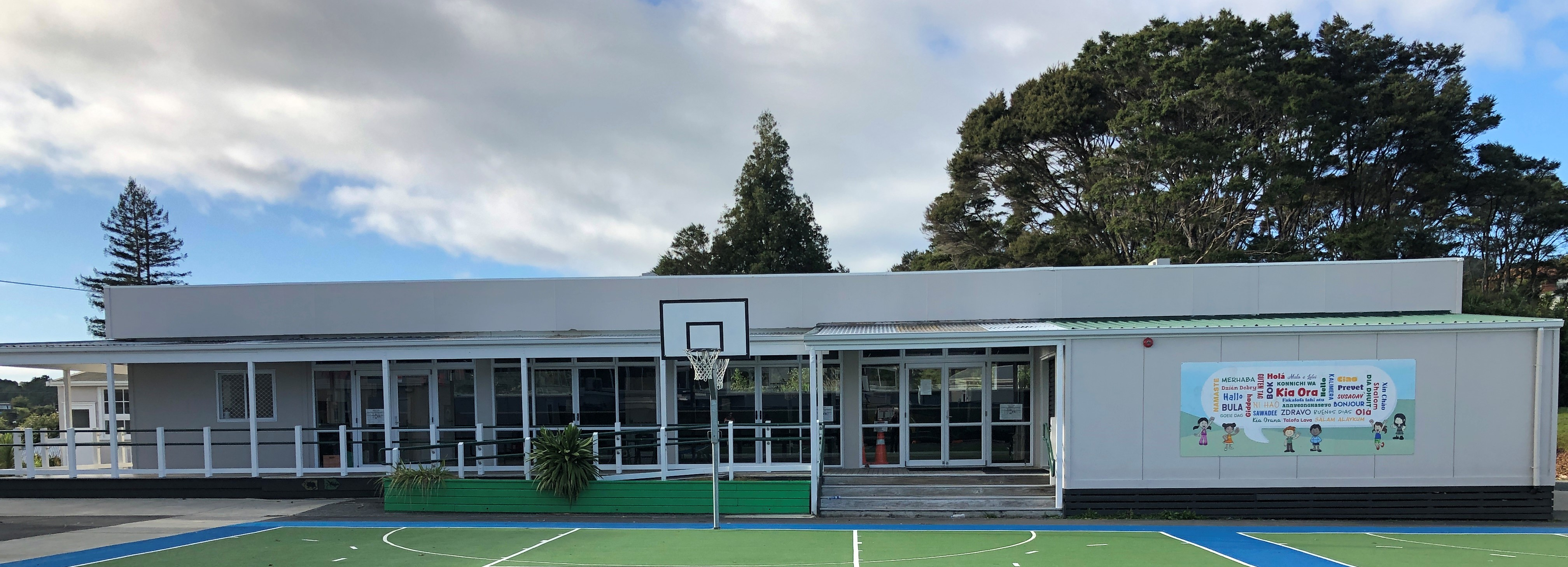
Hall Konini School

After ten years of fundraising, an extended and updated school hall was opened on 27 August 2004. The $235,000 cost was covered by funding from the Ministry of Education, and the ASB Bank Charitable and the Portage Licensing Trusts. The principal Barry Hambleton explained the "interesting history" of the old hall, noting that it was originally a post office, moved onto the site in 1998, adding that the alterations "could easily cater for the school's roll of more than 300...[and]...we've got a number of community groups that can use it as well".

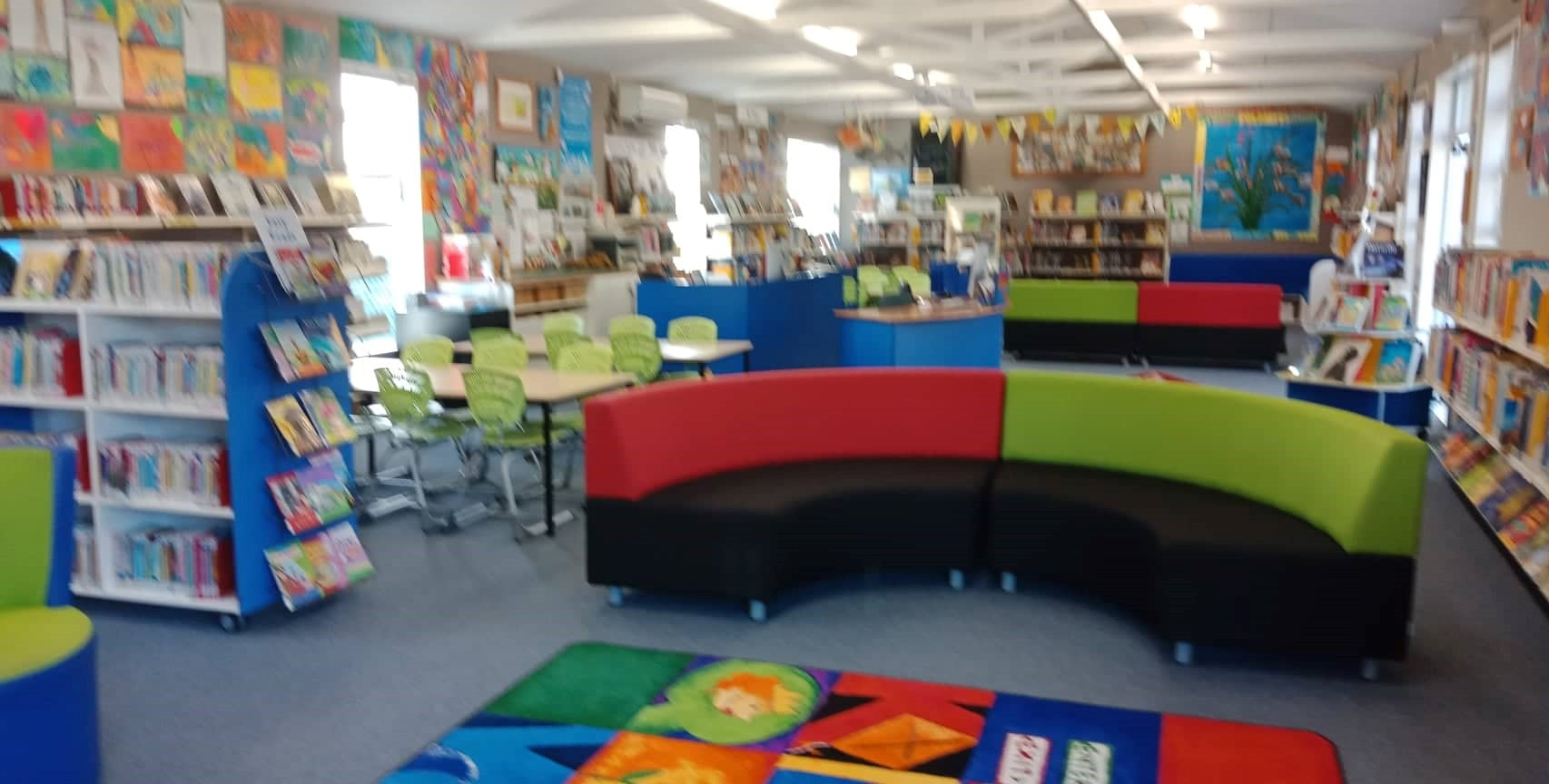
The library

A new library was completed in May 2007 and the principal told the community in a newsletter that it was "great and opened each lunch hour with a large number of children...the window seat now just needs some nice new cushions." The library was officially opened on 2 August 2007. The ceremony involved a full pōwhiri for guests, including Mayor Bob Harvey who talked about his time at the school and presented four books for the library. The school councillors led the guests to the new library supported by the school kapa haka group and the ribbon was cut and a plaque unveiled by Sasha Santosh who was Principal for the Day. Lynne Pillay, a local Member of Parliament, said she was "convinced that the new library will be a wonderful tool to ensure the children of Konini School get the best education and support possible".

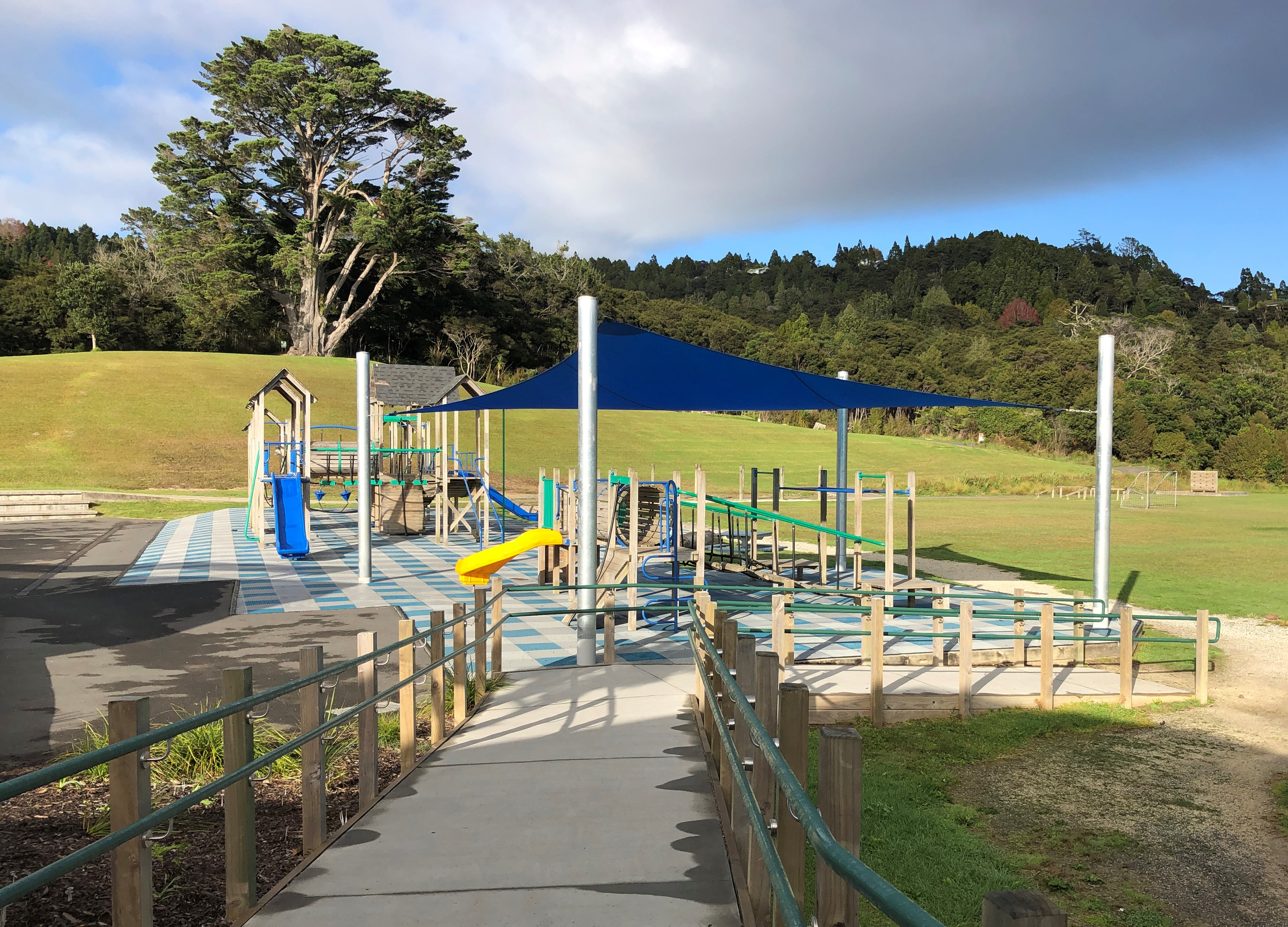
Konini school playground

It was announced in May 2012 that the P.T.A. was in the process of applying for funding to build a new playground. Support for the financing from The Trusts Community Foundation was acknowledged and the playground was seen as adding "a new dimension to fun and fitness for [the] students." The principal informed parents in a newsletter on 18 October 2012 that the playground was completed and had been officially opened.

In 2019, the school Board of Trustees (Bot) undertook major capital works involving refurbishing classrooms, including upgrading display boards, floor coverings, electrical work and the installation of sliding doors between rooms.

== Promotion of cycling ==
Konini School is involved in Bikes in Schools, a programme provided by Sport Waitakere. In 2016, the local newspaper reported that the 1.2 kilometre bike track at Konini, was the only Bikes in Schools track that incorporates bush. To support the programme, in 2021, Sport Waitakere, trained teachers to develop their cycle skills and be better able to instruct students. Pauline Butt from Sport Waitakere said that "ensuring our teachers are well equipped to teach students is an important step to getting more students out and enjoying the adventures that riding a bike offers". The school has a 400m sandstone path around the field created by the Bikes in Schools, and a 150m mountain bike trail through nearby native bush. As well as being used during school time, Auckland Council recommends them as safe for community use.

On 9 June 2017, as part of a promotion by Auckland Transport to improve cycleways in the city, Konini joined other schools in the area to break the Guinness World Record for the largest human image of a bicycle previously held by Kenilworth School in England. The formation, which involved 1799 students, took five minutes and was "captured by a drone camera and documented by a Guinness World Records project manager". The cycling and road safety manager at Auckland Transport, Kathryn King, said it was "about preparing the future generation of commuters to make the choice to travel in an active way, on a bike or by foot to public transport."

== Support programmes ==
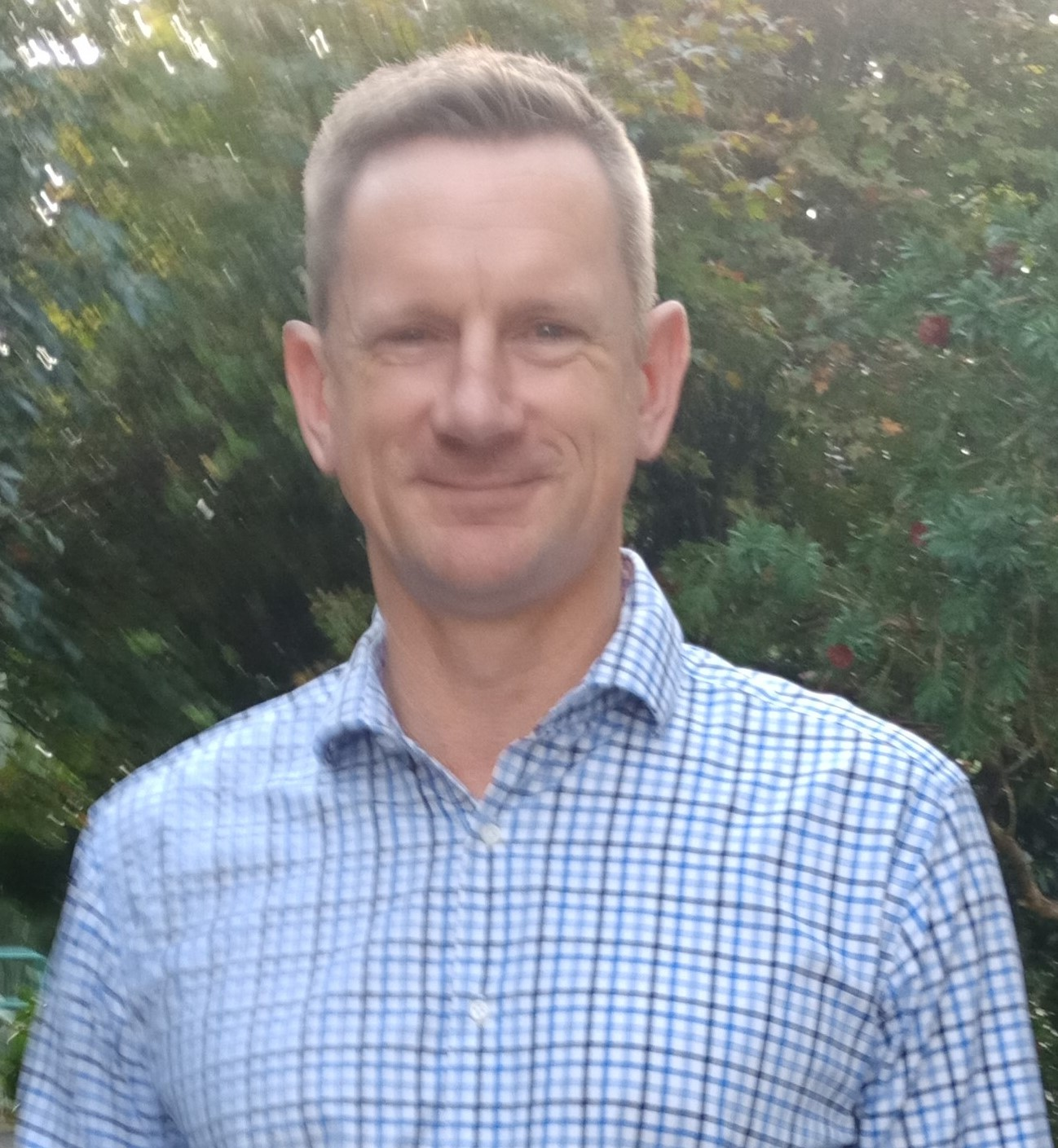
Andrew Ducat

When a Year 3 student who needed extra time to articulate words due to having cerebral palsy was supported by the school to join a charity called DOGabled in 2017, his teacher and the principal noted that he had overcome anxiety about reading, engaged in a class reading group and achieved at the same level of his peers. Lisa Cochrane, deputy principal and special needs coordinator, explained it involved the student reading out loud to a dog, and that "for a lot of children on the autism spectrum or with dyslexia, the normal tools don't necessarily work, so we are looking to the dog to help unlock some different things...[without focusing]... on the impediment". Andrew Ducat, appointed as principal in 2016, said that historically there was little awareness of how anxiety at school affected students on the spectrum, adding "that the evidence this programme worked was helpful as more parents felt able to inform the school about their students' needs".

== Collaborative projects ==
In 2004, Konini School participated in a Ministry of Education programme called Literacy Professional Development (LPDP) and was acknowledged, along with other participating schools, as contributing to data that showed "the improvement for students in years 4–6 in LPDP was twice that of the average student...Pasifika students made more progress than average in both reading and writing...[and]..boys in all groups showed greater than average improvement, and [were] catching up with girls".

Konini was part of the West Auckland Principal Association (WAPA) Learning Change Network, a cluster of schools in West Auckland that worked collaboratively to identify areas of change that could be implemented in the interests of improved student learning. It was noted in a 2014 newsletter that the focus of the programmes at Konini School was a data-based approach to develop reciprocal teaching and learning practices that aimed to build agency through an inquiry-based learning.

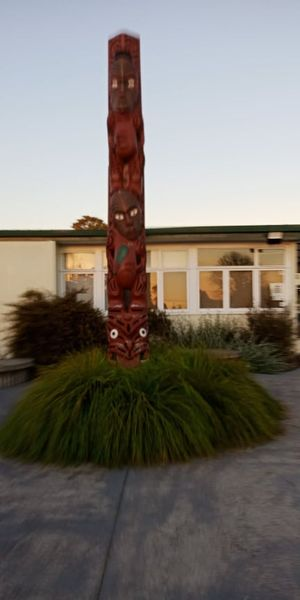
Pouwhenua

2014 The school liaised with local iwi, initially Ngāti Whātua and later Te Kawerau ā Maki and as a result of this collaboration, a Pouwhenua (Te Pou) was erected at the school's entrance in 2014. This was seen as developing strong relationships between school, whanau and community and reflected an "authentic collaborative approach, extending beyond the home and into the wider community". Konini School has said that Te Pou was regarded as a rangatira and kaitiaki, and the chief Te Kawerau ā Maki, represented wisdom and the sharing of knowledge.

As of 2023, Konini School is part of the Auckland Transport Travelwise Initiative, a road safety programme to provide students with safety skills for cycling, scooting and road crossing; relevant classroom activities for teachers; and training for parents to set up a walking bus. Travelwise aims to build good communication between schools, and for Auckland Transport to provide information about local traffic conditions and possible future projects. It was noted that Waitākere Ranges Local Board and Auckland Transport proposed to install new raised zebra crossings near the school.

== Sporting achievements ==
In 2004, students from Konini School shared first place with Kaurilands in the region's zone athletics competition.

After obtaining a grant from Portage Licensing Trust in 2005, the school purchased a giant outdoor chess set which cost around $1800 and was imported from Germany. The set has 60 cm-high pieces and a portable plastic board, and a teacher at the school, Paul Carter, said that there were now about 60 students playing chess, using the set "every interval and lunch break and sometimes before the school day begins. The school had won the Auckland chess championships in the two previous years and was second in the regional finals in 2004.

More than 240 students from eight schools entered the Western Zone Inter-School Cross country event which was held at Konini School in 2006.

Pamela Chua, a pupil at the school represented New Zealand in Karate at the Oceania championships in New Caledonia in 2007.

Konini School along with two other local schools won the Rugby League Carnival Day in 2013. In November 2019, the Konini team beat Waterview School in the grand final of the Western Zone Primary School Kiwi Tag Tournament and advanced to the Champion of Champions competition.

== Environmental initiatives ==
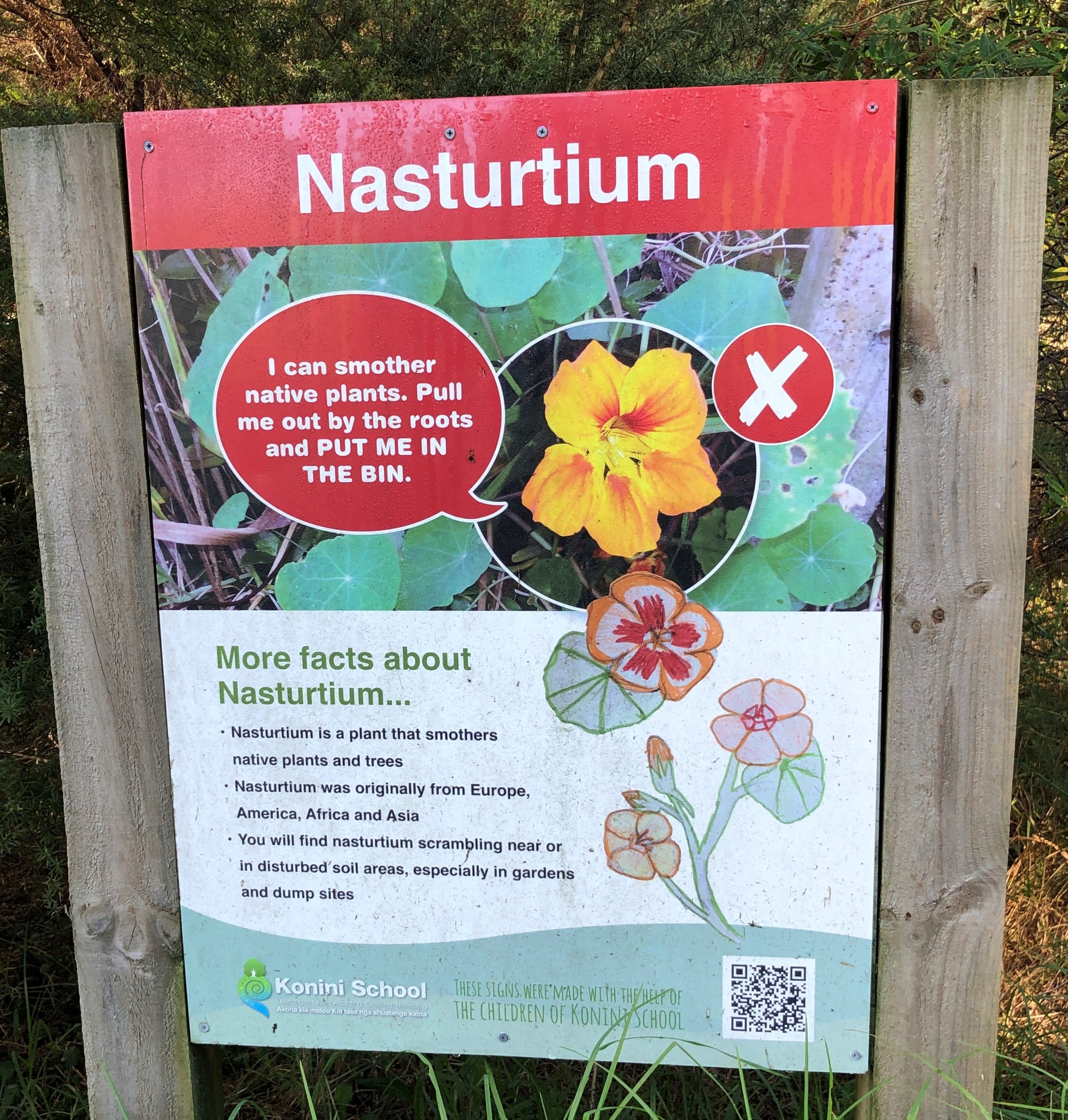
Weed buster sign

In 2009, the school was involved in Sustaining our Streams, a council-funded project to restore streams in the area. Because of the work that by students and staff did in removing weeds from the forest on the school property, they were nominated for the 2010 Weedbusters Award. The commitment of Konini School to restore their streamside area and control the weeds on the school supported an application to become an Enviroschool.

The Mayor of Auckland Len Brown, opened the Enviro Maze art trail at the school on 11 March 2013. This trail resulted from a six-month collaboration with Auckland Council to enhance the environment and tied in with the re-design of the front of the school. The art-based nature trail was coordinated by a local artist, Mandy Patmore. Patmore noted that when the Auckland Council hired her to teach kids about the environment using art, she wasn't yet an environmental artist, but realised you "can raise all the awareness you want, but if there’s no action, then it’s pointless".

Konini School received a grant of $2306 from the Mazda Foundation in 2016, with the money designated for purchasing 386 native plants to restore the block of bush at the back of the school. The planting of the natives became a part of the school's programme of monitoring local streams and a teacher at the school was acknowledged for her role in developing a group to teach how to propagate native plants, learn more about the inhabitants of the streams and opening up the space as an "educational resource for learning about native fauna and flora". A group of students called Stream Rangers Konini School established a blog to share what was being done to take care of the local streams. In 2016, the group posted suggestions for art that could be displayed on classroom walls to draw attention to the issues. The post also explained that the removal of dangerous weeds such as Deadly Knightshade and Wandering Jew was an essential part of the programme.

When the school notified Auckland Council that they had discovered contamination of a stream near by the school in 2015, students were banned from using the surrounding four-hectare native bush block for almost six months. When the Council did the testing, the information was not provided to the school, despite a request for it. The school's board of trustees chairwoman Hannah Sperber said she felt the students were being blocked from using this resource. All the school wanted was reassurance that the area was safe to use and that future contamination would be prevented.

The Chair of Waitakere Ranges Local Board, Greg Presland, noted in his Report of October 2017, that while Konini School had Enviroschool status, it was still underfunded to fully maintain the bush on the grounds which was close to the Waitakere Ranges Heritage Area. The principal, Andrew Ducat said that he was doing what he could with limited resources and ensuring that learning about sustainability and the "protection and enhancement of the bush was a priority for the school". Presland said that the Local Board aimed to offer some small grants and advice to schools such as Konini for restoration projects, and while through the "power of community and the passion of the staff and the pupils really good things can be achieved...[there were concerns]...that the Enviroschool's budget is one of the budgets that has been cut through Council cost-saving and the local board is being asked to fill in the gap...[for]...work [that] is far too important not to be funded".

The school community was notified that some of the bush areas would be closed for a few days in May 2020 so that arborists could remove introduced trees to make room for the planting of native species. Andrew Ducat explained that the school had a long-term plan to remove trees such as Wattle and Pine because they cause "collateral damage of the native undergrowth...[and it is necessary to]...remove the culprits behind the constant re-seeding of the new noxious trees....[so]...native species can then thrive in their natural habitat".

Konini was accredited as a Green-Gold Enviroschool in November 2020 for their efforts in developing composting systems, taking care of the local bush, raising chickens and "growing kumara to make soup to celebrate Matariki with their community".

== Concerns ==
As an unfenced school within the local community, the school has faced some challenging issues. Konini School was noted in the media in 2008, as one of many schools dealing with the dumping of waste on the school grounds, in this case, chemical solvents left beside a clothing bin close to the school entrance. The principal said that this caused unwanted emergencies but because of regular fire drills, he was pleased with the way his pupils had handled the situation. Dumping on school grounds was acknowledged as increasing by Owen Alexander of the Auckland Principals' Association, and Kerry Gregory, the Waitakere deputy fire officer, confirmed that since 2007, there had been 634 callouts to deal with hazardous substances.

The school had problems with vandalism in 2010 and the principal at the time, Barry Hambleton, said it was also an issue for neighbouring schools. Still, despite improved security lighting, it was difficult to identify those who were responsible. Hambleton explained that the school attempted to fix the damage early in the morning to avoid causing upset to the students when they arrived. He noted that fencing the school grounds was impossible but the board would install security cameras, concluding that people needed to be educated about the issue.

Once or twice, the school did experience minor break-ins. Sometime around 2023-2025, fences were eventually built around certain premises of the school.

== Street safety around the school ==
In 2018, the Konini School Parent Teachers Association proposed to Auckland Transport that safety and access issues to the school be addressed. The proposal recommended a 30 km/h speed limit zone around the school, installment of pedestrian crossings, the development of a cycling shared path and widening of some of the footpaths. On 6 September 2019, as a result of funding from Waitākere Ranges Local Board Community Safety Fund, Auckland Council confirmed that the school would get three new zebra crossings. When Auckland Council's Environment and Climate Change Committee met on 14 March 2022 and discussed issues around the plan to encourage more safe walking around the city, Sharon Stewart a Councillor, asked about the materials being used in the road projects around Konini School, in particular hit-sticks and road humps. She was assured that the council was "working closely with the school's own transport plan and will involve co-design towards an agreement outcome".

=== Ngā Tiriti Ngangahau - The Vibrant Streets Programme ===
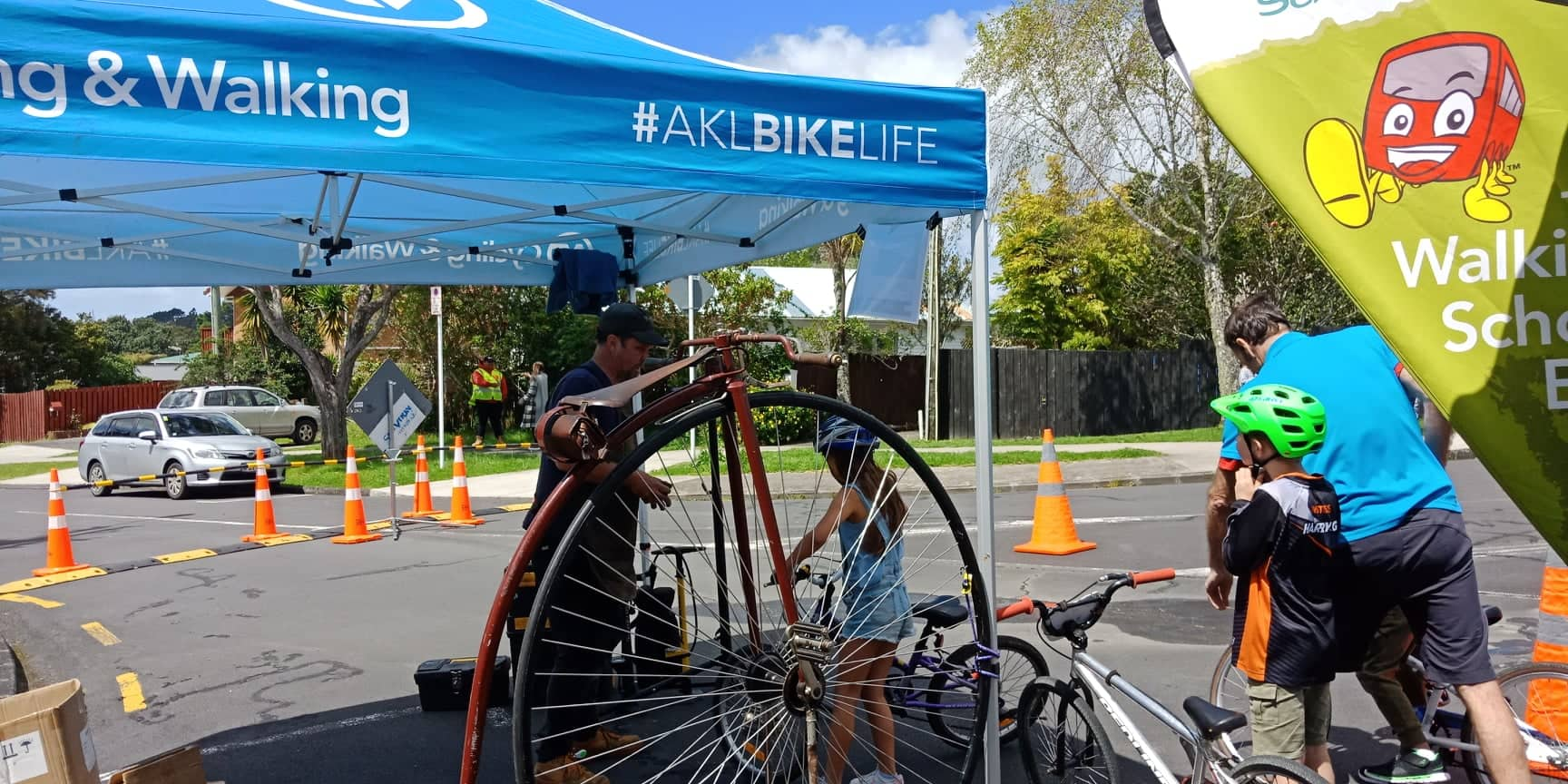
Konini school celebrating the funding from the Auckland Council 19 October 2022

To address the issues of road safety around schools, Auckland Council confirmed, as part of their 10-year budget, Ngā Tiriti Ngangahau - previously known as Regional Streets for People - as a $3 million, three-year climate action initiative delivered by Auckland Transport. Environment and Climate Change committee Deputy Chair Councillor Pippa Coom said the programme is about reducing transport emission by developing road safety goals aimed at making it "easier and safer for locals to use alternative methods to get around their neighbourhoods, and encouraging, for example, riding bikes to school instead of driving". Konini school, in partnership with Waitākere Ranges Local Board, applied to this programme under the project name Konini School - Safer Streets to "test out aspects of the school transport plan, including wayfinding options, possible pop-up cycleways and creating safer crossing points." As one of seven projects in Auckland, funding was confirmed for the school in March 2022. Chair of the Waitākere Ranges Local Board Saffron Toms, acknowledged the support and engagement of the local community and that the Board was hoping for a successful project [that could]..."lead to other projects in other parts of our board area that will improve street safety around schools and encourage more children to walk or cycle to and from school".

== External review ==
A report by the Education Review Office (E.R.O.) on 8 November 2018, noted that the school's Values were evident in the strategic plan and the curriculum, and the reasons given for high levels of student achievement included strong relationships between staff and pupils that encouraged the articulation and sharing of these values. Effective leadership and a strong strategic approach to building "professional capability" were seen as strengths. One area suggested for future focus, was the building of systems of "internal evaluation to sustain improvement and innovation".

== Awards ==
In 2001, the school entered a competition by the New Zealand Herald to create a newspaper with particular stories on each page. The school was awarded $10,000 for its Community and Sports Page. On this page, students interviewed the principal who said the money could be spent on more computers and sports gear; wrote reports on a rugby game between the school and Dawson school' and interviewed Danielle Jones, a student who represented Auckland in hockey at her age-group level.

Konini School caretaker Melissa Walen won a prize in the 2007 EcoWise Community Awards run by the Keep Waitakere Beautiful Trust which aimed to keep the area free of weeds, litter and graffiti. School staff acknowledged Walen for her work in supporting students to care for the bush, maintaining the school gardens and identifying taggers who would help her in the gardens as a consequence.

== Gallery ==
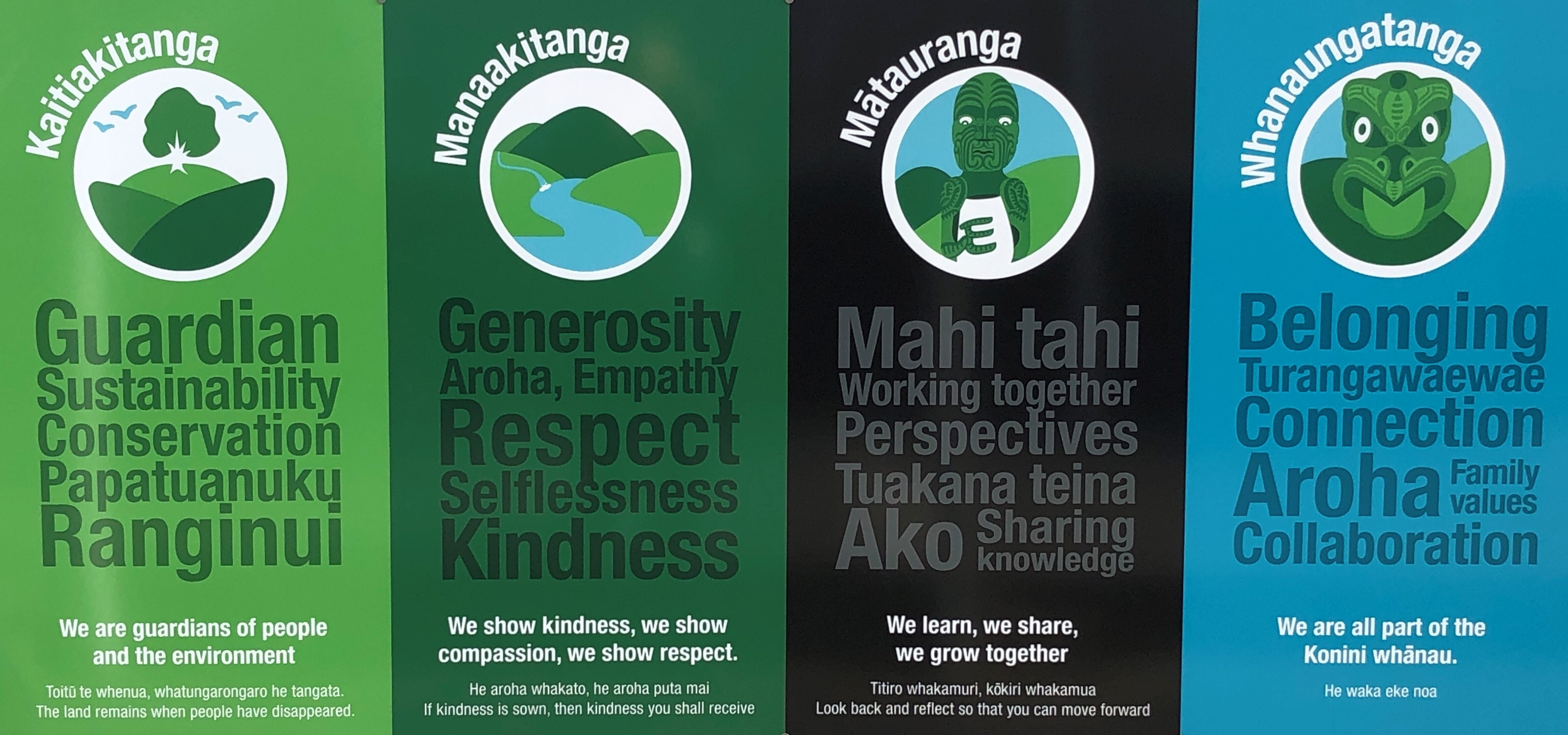
Konini School values

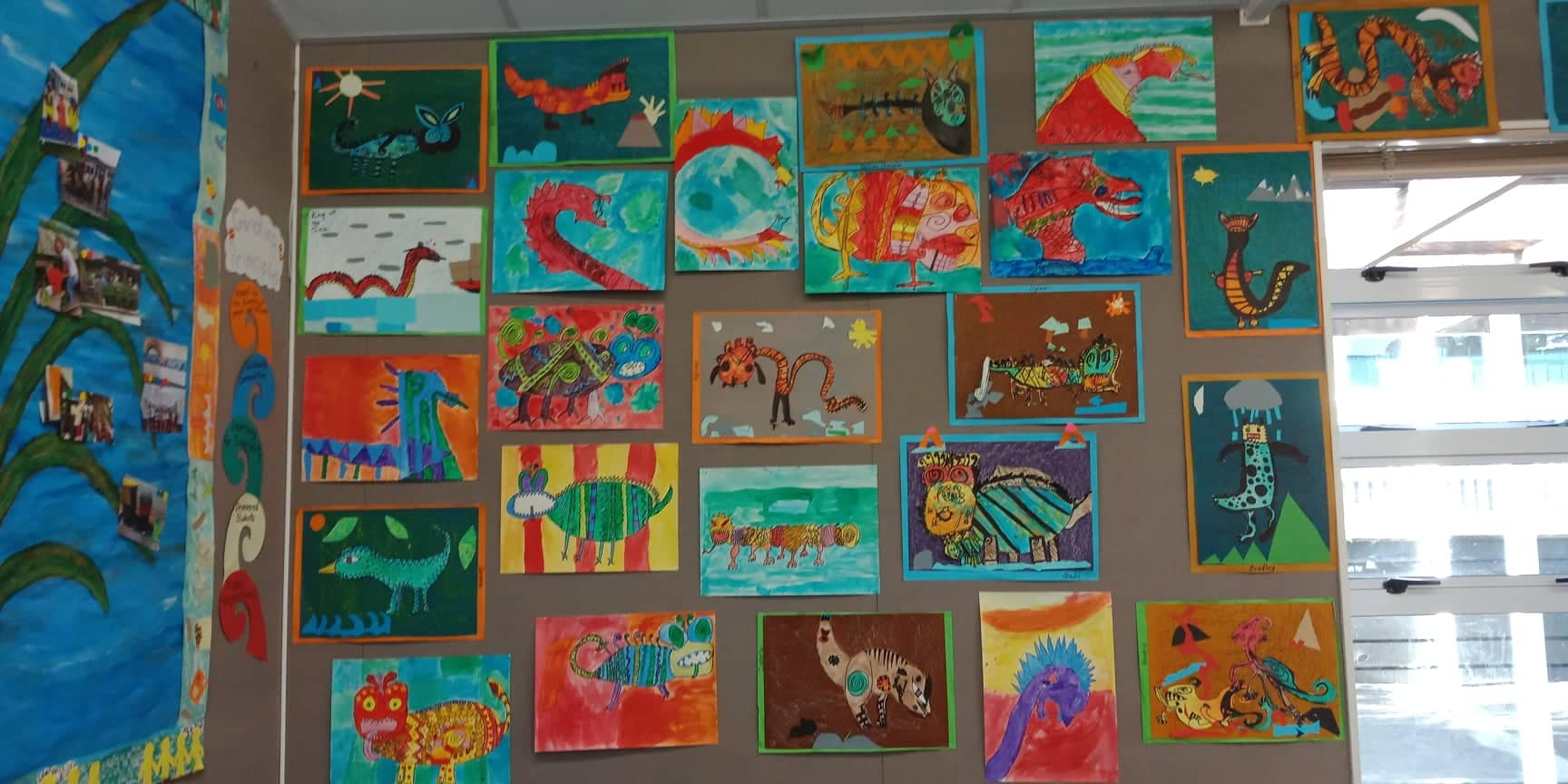
Students' artwork in the library

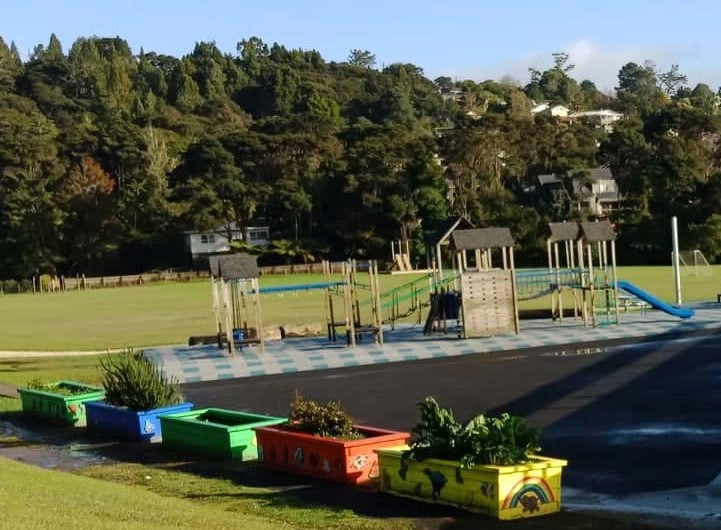
The garden boxes
