= Distributed scaffolding =

Learner-centric pedagogy

Distributed scaffolding is a concept developed by Puntambekar and Kolodner in 1998 that describes an ongoing system of student support through multiple tools, activities, technologies and environments that increase student learning and performance.

Originally introduced by Wood, Bruner, and Ross in 1976, the learning tool of scaffolding is rooted in individualized support and tutoring. Through scaffolded or tutored instruction, a teacher was able to guide the student through a complex set of building block tasks in order to achieve a final pyramid product that the child may not have been able to complete without this active support. The term was conceptualized presuming instruction by an adult expert with a single student, however, the reality of classrooms with 20 or more students do not necessarily lend themselves to this specific structure. With many students and multiple different levels of skill or Zones of Proximal Development, there is a need to create many support structures that can properly address each student's developmental level.

Similar to the term instructional scaffolding, distributed scaffolding addresses the need to provide multiple types, sources, methods, and amounts of supports to help increase a student's ability to perform a skill.

== Theoretical basis of scaffolding ==
This instructional tool is rooted in Vygotsky's socioconstructivist model of the Zone of Proximal Development which states that the ZPD is:

the distance between the actual developmental level as determined by independent problem solving and the level of potential development as determined through problem solving under adult guidance, or in collaboration with more capable peers

Scaffolding is not solely support or help and a support can be designated as scaffolding only when the support is adapted to changing ability and this support is temporary. Because the term scaffolding is accessible, there have been many uses of this construct that are atheoretical, and therefore cloud the way the tool is used and applied in a classroom. Scaffolding is guided by the theory of task and theory of tutee, which requires a combination of assessing task performance and learner ability. Through the dialogic nature of scaffolding, the student and teacher interact in order to establish the optimal amount of assistance and titration of this assistance.

At the heart of the creation of the scaffolding extension to distributed scaffolding, was the need to address the many different ways a scaffold could be provided. Scaffolding need not be limited solely to a teacher student or parent-student situation; in fact scaffolding can be extended to include peers.

Moreover, scaffolds need not be restricted to people as effective means of support could include computer programs, resources, environments, and other objects as long as the tool aids a students ability or ZPD to achieve a goal that he or she would not be able to achieve without the guidance of that scaffold.

== Components of scaffolding ==
There are five common components in the definition of scaffolding:

1. Common Goal: Creating a mutually defined goal between the guide and student helps achieve intersubjectivity and recruitment of the student to the task. This shared understanding contributes to successful scaffolding by enlisted common understanding of the ultimate completion of the task.
2. Ongoing Diagnosis: Through ongoing diagnosis of task performance and student ability, the scaffold can be tailored to provide the optimal level of support. This dimension highlights the need for scaffolding to be deliberate and specific support for both the task and tutee and therefore illustrates the difference from mere support or hints and tailored task and tutee specific support.
3. Dynamic and Adaptive support: through interactive and constant assessment, teachers are able to evaluate student progress in order to tailor subsequent supports and tasks to the needs of the student.
4. Dialogues and interactions are foundational for scaffolding as another key to the success for the student is the interactive nature of this tool enabling the student to be an active participant in learning and the teacher to be able to assess student understanding throughout the course of the project. This component is a foundational element to the reciprocal teaching method proposed by Palinscar and Brown in 1984.
5. Fading and transfer of responsibility: Fading is the final step of scaffolding and signifies a shift in responsibility from teacher/scaffold to individual responsibility and ability to complete the task. Through the “titration of assistance”, the student takes on more responsibility in the task as scaffolds and guidance are adaptively reduced.

== Types of distributed scaffolds ==
Tabak distinguishes between three different types of scaffolds: differentiated scaffolds, redundant scaffolds, and synergistic scaffolds.

1. Differentiated scaffolds refer to cases where "different tools and representations support different needs". For example, when a group of students are constructing an initial explanation on or formulating their understanding of a phenomenon (e.g., natural selection), these needs may be better met with prompts provided in a simulation environment; on the other hand, when the students present their formal explanations to the whole class, a more directed and dialogic scaffolding provided by the teacher would help them more efficiently in refining their final explanations.
2. Redundant scaffolds offer “different means of support that target the same need but are enacted at different points in time in the curriculum to provide titrated levels of support”. For instance, when students are expected to justify their decision of choosing one design option rather than another, prompts in a design diary may help initiate some students’ justifications, but not all students'. In this scenario, the students can possibly gain additional opportunity to engage in this reflective process if during the subsequent whole-class discussions their teacher presses them to describe the alternatives they proposed and how they decided among these options. Through providing redundant supports and resources, the student can use each of the different types of redundant scaffolds until the supports are no longer necessary. By supplying multiple supports in this manner, the task incorporates natural fading into the design.
3. Synergistic scaffolds are “multiple co-occurring and interacting supports for the same need”. This type of distributed scaffold incorporates "different tools or agents that support the same skill in different ways". For example, when learning to manipulate variables in a virtual experiment, students may find it easier if "the teacher models the thinking while she or he uses the software that the students are using", such as "making appropriate menu selections and explicating his or her rationale for taking these actions".
