= P. David Pearson =

American reading and literacy scholar (1941–2026)

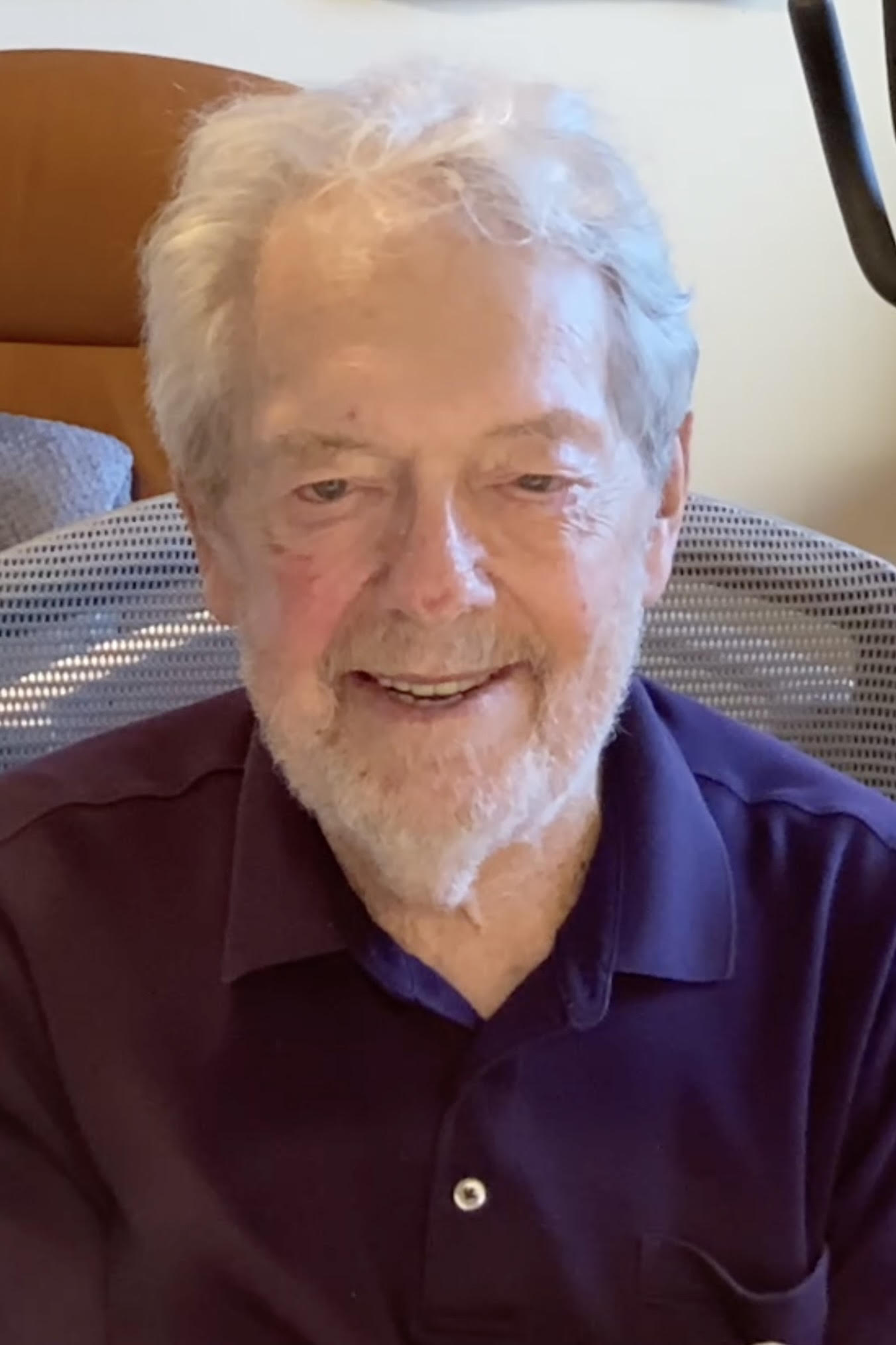
- Born: April 28, 1941; Oroville, California, U.S.
- Died: August 30, 2026 (aged 85)
- Awards: Alan Purves Award from the National Council of Teachers of English (2004); Election to the American Academy of Arts and Sciences (2026)

Academic background
- Education: University of California, Berkeley (BA); University of Minnesota (PhD)

Academic work
- Discipline: literacy education reading comprehension
- Institutions: School of Education at the University of California, Berkeley

P. David Pearson (April 28, 1941 – August 30, 2026) was an American reading and literacy scholar. He was a professor emeritus in the School of Education at the University of California, Berkeley, where he served as Dean from 2001 to 2010. He was elected to National Academy of Education in 2003 and received the Alan Purves Award from the National Council of Teachers of English in 2004. In 2026, Pearson was elected to the American Academy of Arts and Sciences.

His work focused on reading comprehension, reading assessment and the historical and policy dimensions of literacy education.

== Early life and education ==
Pearson was born in Oroville, California on April 28, 1941, the youngest of six children. He attended multiple elementary schools in the Sacramento and Sonoma Valleys before completing high school at Healdsburg High School in the Sonoma Valley. He earned his Bachelor of Arts in history with distinction and Phi Beta Kappa from the University of California, Berkeley in 1963, after which he taught fifth grade in multilingual classrooms in Porterville, California, Pearson then entered the doctoral program in reading education at the University of Minnesota, where he received his Ph.D. in 1969.

He completed post‑doctoral appointment at the University of Texas at Austin in 1970 and additional post‑doctoral work at Stanford University in 1976.

== Career ==
Pearson began his academic career at the University of Minnesota from 1970 to 1978, after which he held appointments at the University of Illinois at Urbana‑Champaign from 1978 to 1995, Michigan State University from 1995 to 2001, and the University of California, Berkeley from 2001 to 2021. At Berkeley, he served as Dean of the Graduate School of Education from 2001 to 2010.

He also held endowed positions including the John A. Hannah Distinguished Professor of Education at Michigan State University and both the Corey Chair in Instructional Science and the Corey Emeritus Chair at UC Berkeley.

Pearson served on the boards of the International Literacy Association (ILA) and the Association of Colleges of Teacher Education. He served as president of the National Reading Conference (now Literacy Research Association) and the National Conference of Research in English.

He served as editor of Reading Research Quarterly, the NRC Yearbook, and Review of Research in Education, and has sat on editorial boards of Journal of Educational Psychology and Journal of Literacy Research.

In 2012, the Literacy Research Association established the P. David Pearson Scholarly Influence Award in his honor.

== Research and scholarly works ==
Pearson authored or co-authored 300 scholarly publications, including books and peer-reviewed articles.

He was an advocate of evidence-based literacy instruction and contributed and held researches to the gradual release of responsibility model, developed with collaborator M. C. Gallagher.

His research also focused on schema theory, emphasizing the role of background knowledge in comprehension and its reciprocal relationship with learning. He was associated with concepts such as the “radical middle,” which seeks to balance explicit skill instruction with engagement in authentic texts, and contributed to large-scale studies, including work with the Center for the Improvement of Early Reading Achievement (CIERA), examining effective approaches to literacy instruction and school reform.

== Death ==
Pearson died on August 30, 2026, at the age of 85.

== Awards ==
- Oscar Causey Award from the National Reading Conference (now LRA) (1989).
- William S. Gray Citation of Merit from the International Reading Association (now ILA) (1990).
- Alan Purves Award from the National Council of Teachers of English (2004).
- Albert J. Harris Award from the International Reading Association (2005)
- Election to the National Academy of Education (2003).
- Election to the American Academy of Arts and Sciences (2026).
