= Directed listening and thinking activity =

The directed listening and thinking activity (DLTA) is a strategy that was first identified by Stauffer (1980). It is used with early childhood students or students who are not yet successful independent readers. Teachers use this strategy to establish a purpose for reading with their students. With the use of this strategy students can become engaged in a text that they could not otherwise read on their own. Students are prepared to listen to a story that will be read by their teacher by being given specific information that they are to focus on as they listen. The strategy utilizes pre-reading, reading, and post-reading questions and discussions. Teachers use this strategy in an attempt to build on the knowledge that students already know and apply it to new information and situations. Students are provided with a framework to organize and recall information from storybooks. The directed reading and thinking activity is a very similar strategy that can be applied once this strategy is mastered and students become more advanced, independent readers.

== Purpose ==
Students need to be explicitly taught strategies for the comprehension of a story. The purpose of this strategy is to give the students skills so that they can eventually internalize reading skills such as, setting purposes for reading and summarizing what they have read. As a result of continuously using this strategy in the classroom students should develop metacognition of their own reading abilities and as a result a better comprehension, understanding, and connections to texts.

== Procedure ==
=== Reading the story ===
The teacher now begins to read the story. It is important to make sure that students can see all of the illustrations. The teacher should stop one or two times to discuss the story and to ask the students which previous predictions were correct. Students should also continue to make predictions at a few points in the story as well. It is important not to ask too many questions while reading the story. To help students to focus attention on the story, it is better to wait until after reading it through once to ask most of the questions about the students’ reactions, comments, and questions.

=== Discussion after reading ===
This is the final part of the directed listening and thinking activity. At this time there should be a discussion between the students and the teacher that is connected to the objectives and purposes for reading that were originally established. For example, if the skill that was established was sequencing the students will need to recall information about the order of the events in the story. The end is a way to tie together the skills that the students were focusing on and to summarize what they have learned as a result of listening to the story. If the students do not respond to particular questions that are asked about the story it is the teacher’s responsibility to model or scaffold their responses. This can be done by asking a question in a different or simpler way or by giving the student more information. This should also be a time to go back to the predictions that were initially listed and revise and discuss them. After the teacher has discussed the story and the objectives as a group an independent activity can be done to assess what the students have learned.

== Reading objectives ==
There are a wide range of objectives that you can use with this strategy. Basically any skill that pertains to the text can be employed. Examples of the different types of skills that the directed listening activity can be used to enhance are: literal information such as, sequencing and recalling facts, inferential responses such as, interpreting the feelings of characters, making predictions, relating story events to real-life experiences and visualizing, or critical responses such as, evaluating and problem solving. The strategy can also be used with various genres and story structures. However, it is important to remember that the three steps to using this strategy are always the same:

1. preparation for reading
2. reading
3. discussion after reading.

== Conclusion ==
In a study conducted by Morrow (1984) children scored higher on comprehension tests when this strategy was utilized in the classroom because of its focus on many skills that are important to good readers. The study also proved that the modeling and scaffolding used by the teacher during this technique better prepared students to understand unfamiliar texts. When this strategy is used in classrooms it will allow students to better comprehend and connect with the texts that are being read to them. If this strategy is done correctly and frequently it will bring students more independence and reading readiness. It will lead to the creation of more engaged and skilled readers who possess the ability to think critically and analyze the texts that they have read.

== Related links ==
- Review of Literature
- Directed Reading-Thinking Activity - TeacherVision
- FCAT Reading Grade 4 DLTA/DRTA
- DLTA
