= Reading comprehension =

Ability to read and understand text

Reading comprehension is the ability to process written text, understand its meaning, and to integrate with what the reader already knows. Reading comprehension relies on two abilities that are connected to each other: word reading and language comprehension. Comprehension specifically is a "creative, multifaceted process" that is dependent upon four language skills: phonology, syntax, semantics, and pragmatics. Reading comprehension is beyond basic literacy alone, which is the ability to decipher characters and words at all. The opposite of reading comprehension is called functional illiteracy. Reading comprehension occurs on a gradient or spectrum, rather than being yes/no (all-or-nothing). In education it is measured in standardized tests that report which percentile a reader's ability falls into, as compared with other readers' ability.

Some of the fundamental skills required in efficient reading comprehension are the ability to:

- know the meaning of words,
- understand the meaning of a word from a discourse context,
- follow the organization of a passage and to identify antecedents and references in it,
- draw inferences from a passage about its contents,
- identify the main thought of a passage,
- ask questions about the text,
- answer questions asked in a passage,
- visualize the text,
- recall prior knowledge connected to text,
- recognize confusion or attention problems,
- recognize the literary devices or propositional structures used in a passage and determine its tone,
- understand the situational mood (agents, objects, temporal and spatial reference points, casual and intentional inflections, etc.) conveyed for assertions, questioning, commanding, refraining, etc., and
- determine the writer's purpose, intent, and point of view, and draw inferences about the writer (discourse-semantics).

Comprehension skills that can be applied as well as taught to all reading situations include:

- Summarizing
- Sequencing
- Inferencing
- Comparing and contrasting
- Drawing conclusions
- Self-questioning
- Problem-solving
- Relating background knowledge
- Distinguishing between fact and opinion
- Finding the main idea, important facts, and supporting details.

There are many reading strategies to use in improving reading comprehension and inferences, these include improving one's vocabulary, critical text analysis (intertextuality, actual events vs. narration of events, etc.), and practising deep reading. The ability to comprehend text is influenced by the readers' skills and their ability to process information. If word recognition is difficult, students tend to use too much of their processing capacity to read individual words which interferes with their ability to comprehend what is read.

== Overview ==
Some people learn comprehension skills through education or instruction and others learn through direct experiences. Proficient reading depends on the ability to recognize words quickly and effortlessly. It is also determined by an individual's cognitive development, which is "the construction of thought processes".

There are specific characteristics that determine how successfully an individual will comprehend text, including prior knowledge about the subject, well-developed language, and the ability to make inferences from methodical questioning & monitoring comprehension like: "Why is this important?" and "Do I need to read the entire text?" are examples of passage questioning.

Instruction for comprehension strategy often involves initially aiding the students by social and imitation learning, wherein teachers explain genre styles and model both top-down and bottom-up strategies, and familiarize students with a required complexity of text comprehension. After the contiguity interface, the second stage involves the gradual release of responsibility wherein over time teachers give students individual responsibility for using the learned strategies independently with remedial instruction as required and this helps in error management.

The final stage involves leading the students to a self-regulated learning state with more and more practice and assessment, it leads to overlearning and the learned skills will become reflexive or "second nature". The teacher as reading instructor is a role model of a reader for students, demonstrating what it means to be an effective reader and the rewards of being one.

=== Reading comprehension levels ===
Reading comprehension involves two levels of processing, shallow (low-level) processing and deep (high-level) processing.

Deep processing involves semantic processing, which happens when we encode the meaning of a word and relate it to similar words. Shallow processing involves structural and phonemic recognition, the processing of sentence and word structure, i.e. first-order logic, and their associated sounds. This theory was first identified by Fergus I. M. Craik and Robert S. Lockhart.

Comprehension levels are observed through neuroimaging techniques like functional magnetic resonance imaging (fMRI). fMRI is used to determine the specific neural pathways of activation across two conditions: narrative-level comprehension, and sentence-level comprehension. Images showed that there was less brain region activation during sentence-level comprehension, suggesting a shared reliance with comprehension pathways. The scans also showed an enhanced temporal activation during narrative levels tests, indicating this approach activates situation and spatial processing.

In general, neuroimaging studies have found that reading involves three overlapping neural systems: networks active in visual, orthography-phonology (angular gyrus), and semantic functions (anterior temporal lobe with Broca's and Wernicke's areas). However, these neural networks are not discrete, meaning these areas have several other functions as well. The Broca's area involved in executive functions helps the reader to vary depth of reading comprehension and textual engagement in accordance with reading goals.

=== Reading Difficulties and Cognitive Processes ===
Aaron and Frederiksen, both researchers with a focus on cognitive process, took an interest in examining the relationship between reading comprehension and its correlation to developmental reading difficulties. Some of the difficulties they focused on were dyslexia and ADHD out of many others. Simply being able to have comprehension and retention while reading has been described as a process involving multiple psychological processes. These processes have an influence on a reader's ability to organize or interpret written information. Having difficulties in these cognitive areas could potentially affect a reader's ability to engage with reading as a whole. Subsequent researchers studying reading disabilities suggested that comprehension difficulties often have a sense of connection to broader language processing and overall cognitive challenges in the field of literacy.

=== The role of vocabulary ===
Reading comprehension and vocabulary are inextricably linked together. The ability to decode or identify and pronounce words is self-evidently important, but knowing what the words mean has a major and direct effect on knowing what any specific passage means while skimming a reading material. It has been shown that students with a smaller vocabulary than other students comprehend less of what they read. It has also been suggested that to improve comprehension, improving word groups, complex vocabularies such as homonyms or words that have multiple meanings, and those with figurative meanings like idioms, similes, collocations and metaphors are a good practice.

Andrew Biemiller argues that teachers should give out topic-related words and phrases before reading a book to students. Note also that teaching includes topic-related word groups, synonyms of words, and their meaning with the context. He further says teachers should familiarize students with sentence structures in which these words commonly occur. According to Biemiller, this intensive approach gives students opportunities to explore the topic beyond its discourse – freedom of conceptual expansion. However, there is no evidence to suggest the primacy of this approach. Incidental morphemic analysis of words – prefixes, suffixes and roots – is also considered to improve understanding of the vocabulary, though they are proved to be an unreliable strategy for improving comprehension and is no longer used to teach students.

Vocabulary is important as it is what connects a reader to the text, while helping develop background knowledge, their own ideas, communicating, and learning new concepts. Vocabulary has been described as "the glue that holds stories, ideas, and content together...making comprehension accessible". This greatly reflects the important role that vocabulary plays. Especially when studying various pieces of literature, it is important to have this background vocabulary, otherwise readers will become lost rather quickly. Because of this, teachers focus a great deal of attention to vocabulary programs and implementing them into their weekly lesson plans.

=== History ===
Initially most comprehension teaching was that when taken together it would allow students to be imparted through selected techniques for each genre by strategic readers. However, from the 1930s testing various methods never seemed to win support in empirical research. One such strategy for improving reading comprehension is the technique called SQ3R introduced by Francis Pleasant Robinson in his 1946 book Effective Study.

Between 1969 and 2000, a number of "strategies" were devised for teaching students to employ self-guided methods for improving reading comprehension. In 1969 Anthony V. Manzo designed and found empirical support for the Re Quest, or Reciprocal Questioning Procedure, in traditional teacher-centered approach due to its sharing of "cognitive secrets". It was the first method to convert a fundamental theory such as social learning into teaching methods through the use of cognitive modeling between teachers and students.

Since the turn of the 20th century, comprehension lessons usually consist of students answering teacher's questions or writing responses to questions of their own, or from prompts of the teacher. This detached whole group version only helped students individually to respond to portions of the text (content area reading), and improve their writing skills. In the last quarter of the 20th century, evidence accumulated that academic reading test methods were more successful in assessing rather than imparting comprehension or giving a realistic insight. Instead of using the prior response registering method, research studies have concluded that an effective way to teach comprehension is to teach novice readers a bank of "practical reading strategies" or tools to interpret and analyze various categories and styles of text.

Common Core State Standards (CCSS) have been implemented in hopes that students test scores would improve. Some of the goals of CCSS are directly related to students and their reading comprehension skills, with them being concerned with students learning and noticing key ideas and details, considering the structure of the text, looking at how the ideas are integrated, and reading texts with varying difficulties and complexity.

== Reading strategies ==
There are a variety of strategies used to teach reading. Strategies are key to help with reading comprehension. They vary according to the challenges like new concepts, unfamiliar vocabulary, long and complex sentences, etc. Trying to deal with all of these challenges at the same time may be unrealistic. Then again strategies should fit to the ability, aptitude and age level of the learner. Some of the strategies teachers use are: reading aloud, group work, and more reading exercises.

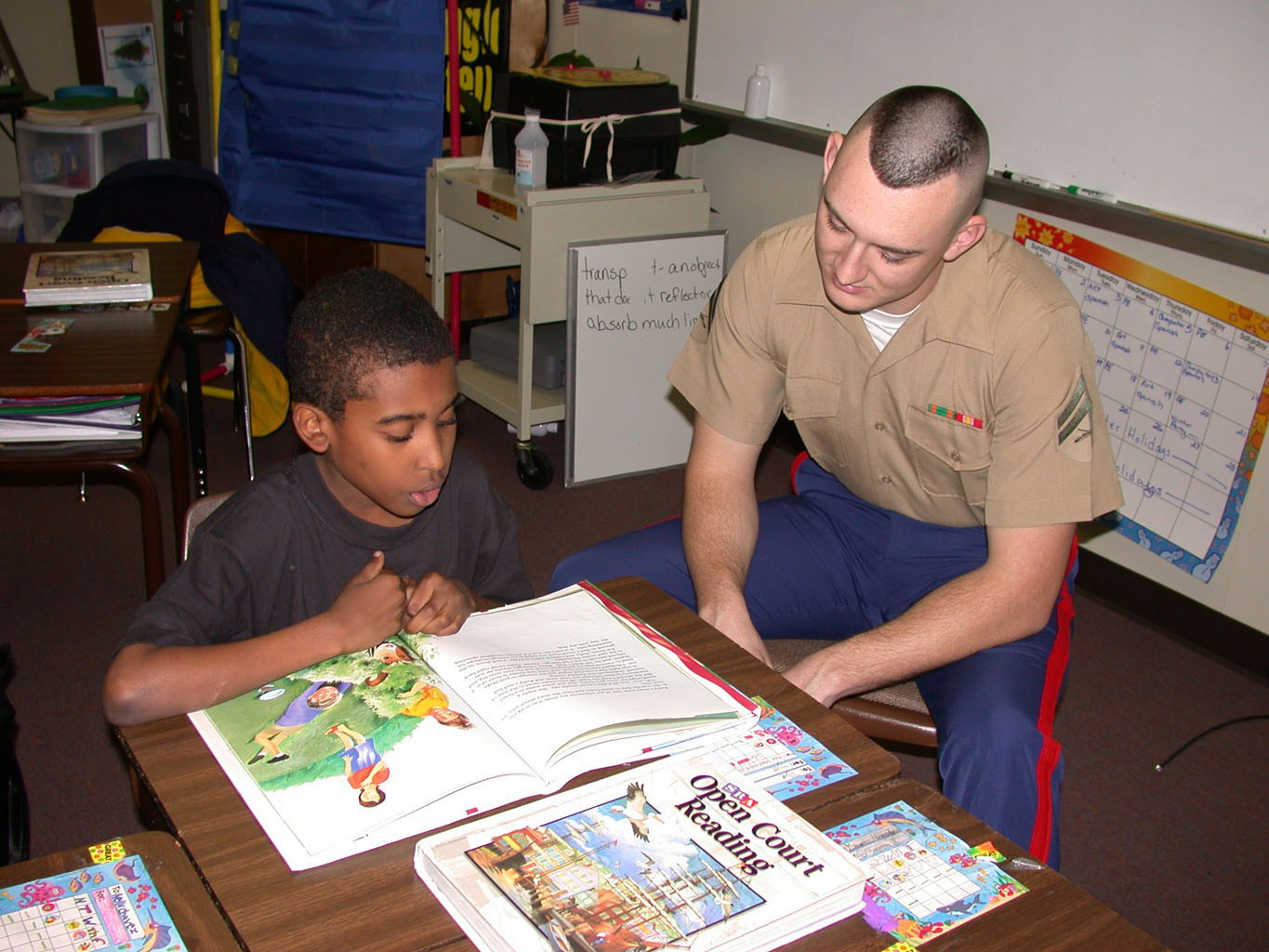
A U.S. Marine helps a student with reading comprehension as part of a Partnership in Education program sponsored by Park Street Elementary School and Navy/Marine Corps Reserve Center Atlanta. The program is a community outreach program for sailors and Marines to visit the school and help students with class work.

=== Reciprocal teaching ===
In the 1980s, Annemarie Sullivan Palincsar and Ann L. Brown developed a technique called reciprocal teaching that taught students to predict, summarize, clarify, and ask questions for sections of a text. The use of strategies like summarizing after each paragraph has come to be seen as effective for building students' comprehension. The idea is that students will develop stronger reading comprehension skills on their own if the teacher gives them explicit mental tools for unpacking text.

=== Classroom Discussion and Comprehension ===
In a collaborative effort, researchers Rex and McEachen discovered an association between classroom discussion practices and improved academic literacy rates in students. Discussion based learning environments have shown to encourage students in the process of engaging in an active manner with assigned texts and to be open minded enough to consider multiple interpretations of the same text. Collaborative discussions practices also serve students in aiding better understanding of difficult or unfamiliar readings through shared analysis. This being said, based on the results of studies on classroom discussions and their relationship to comprehension researchers made the argument that discussion centered classrooms have a positive influence on supporting inclusive literacy practices.They have a positive influence because they encourage the act of participation and interpretation among students who share different reading experiences. Another positive outcome resulted in classroom interaction having a correlation with stronger engagement with academic texts and as result an increase in critical thinking.

=== Instructional conversations ===
"Instructional conversations", or comprehension through discussion, create higher-level thinking opportunities for students by promoting critical and aesthetic thinking about the text. According to Vivian Thayer, class discussions help students to generate ideas and new questions. (Goldenberg, p. 317).

Dr. Neil Postman has said, "All our knowledge results from questions, which is another way of saying that question-asking is our most important intellectual tool" (Response to Intervention). There are several types of questions that a teacher should focus on: remembering, testing, understanding, application or solving, invite synthesis or creating, evaluation and judging. Teachers should model these types of questions through "think-alouds" before, during, and after reading a text. When a student can relate a passage to an experience, another book, or other facts about the world, they are "making a connection". Making connections help students understand the author's purpose and fiction or non-fiction story.

=== Text factors ===
There are factors that, once discerned, make it easier for the reader to understand the written text. One of such is the genre, like folktales, historical fiction, biographies or poetry. Each genre has its own characteristics for text structure that once understood helps the reader comprehend it. A story is composed of a plot, characters, setting, point of view, and theme. Informational books provide real-world knowledge for students and have unique features such as: headings, maps, vocabulary, and an index. Poems are written in different forms and the most commonly used are: rhymed verse, haikus, free verse, and narratives. Poetry uses devices such as: alliteration, repetition, rhyme, metaphors, and similes. "When children are familiar with genres, organizational patterns, and text features in books they're reading, they're better able to create those text factors in their own writing." Another one is arranging the text per perceptual span and a text display favorable to the age level of the reader.

=== Non-verbal imagery ===
Non-verbal imagery refers to media that utilize schemata to make planned or unplanned connections more commonly used within context such as a passage, an experience, or one's imagination. Some notable examples are emojis, emoticons, cropped and uncropped images.

=== Visualization ===
Visualization is a "mental image" created in a person's mind while reading text. This "brings words to life" and helps improve reading comprehension. Asking sensory questions will help students become better visualizers.

Students can practice visualizing before seeing the picture of what they are reading by imagining what they "see, hear, smell, taste, or feel" when they are reading a page of a picture book aloud. They can share their visualizations, then check their level of detail against the illustrations.

=== Partner reading ===
Partner reading is a strategy created for reading pairs. The teacher chooses two appropriate books for the students to read. First, the pupils and their partners must read their own book. Once they have completed this, they are given the opportunity to write down their own comprehension questions for their partner. Then, the students swap books, read them out loud to one another and ask one another questions about the book they have read.

There are different levels of this strategy:

1. The lower ones who need extra help recording the strategies.
2. The average ones who still need some help.
3. The good level. At this level, the children require no help.

This strategy provides a model of fluent reading and helps students learn decoding skills by offering positive feedback, as well as the opportunity for a teacher to listen to students reading aloud, which in turn allows the teacher to give further individualized instruction if necessary.

=== Multiple reading strategies ===
There are a wide range of reading strategies suggested by reading programs and educators. Effective reading strategies may differ for second language learners, as opposed to native speakers. The National Reading Panel identified positive effects only for a subset, particularly summarizing, asking questions, answering questions, comprehension monitoring, graphic organizers, and cooperative learning. The Panel also emphasized that a combination of strategies, as used in Reciprocal Teaching, can be effective. The use of effective comprehension strategies that provide specific instructions for developing and retaining comprehension skills, with intermittent feedback, has been found to improve reading comprehension across all ages, specifically those affected by mental disabilities.

Reading different types of texts requires the use of different reading strategies and approaches. Making reading an active, observable process can be very beneficial to struggling readers. A good reader interacts with the text in order to develop an understanding of the information before them. Some good reader strategies are predicting, connecting, inferring, summarizing, analyzing and critiquing. There are many resources and activities educators and instructors of reading can use to help with reading strategies in specific content areas and disciplines. Some examples are graphic organizers, talking to the text, anticipation guides, double entry journals, interactive reading and note taking guides, chunking, and summarizing.

The use of effective comprehension strategies is highly important when learning to improve reading comprehension. These strategies provide specific instructions for developing and retaining comprehension skills across all ages. Applying methods to attain an overt phonemic awareness with intermittent practice has been found to improve reading in early ages, specifically those affected by mental disabilities.

=== The importance of interest ===
A common statistic that researchers have found is the importance of readers, and specifically students, to be interested in what they are reading. It has been reported by students that they are more likely to finish books if they are the ones that choose them. They are also more likely to remember what they read if they were interested as it causes them to pay attention to the minute details.

=== Students Engagement and Background Knowledge ===
Research with an emphasis on the area of student engagement specifically in the field of reading comprehension suggests the idea that readers interpret texts differently depending on their prior knowledge and their personal experiences. The studies have also proven cultural relevance and authentic texts to positively improve reading engagement, motivation, and comprehension as a whole. Researchers have described the process of comprehension as an active one in which readers construct a sense of meaning from written material rather than simply receiving information. Prior to researchers Zaefferer and Abanomey contributions on the topics of past knowledge and familiarity attributing to positive correlations between texts as well as a reader's interpretation, although this topic was not studied in depth. Additionally, these researchers suggested that students are twice as likely to keep engagement with assigned readings when texts relate to their cultural experiences or overall personal interest. Essentially they suggested students require personal or cultural connection in order to relate and enjoy a piece of writing.

== Reading strategies ==
There are various reading strategies that help readers recognize what they are learning, which allows them to further understand themselves as readers. Also to understand what information they have comprehended. These strategies also activate reading strategies that good readers use when reading and understanding a text.

=== Think-Alouds ===
When reading a passage, it is good to vocalize what one is reading and also their mental processes that are occurring while reading. This can take many different forms, with a few being asking oneself questions about reading or the text, making connections with prior knowledge or prior read texts, noticing when one struggles, and rereading what needs to be. These tasks will help readers think about their reading and if they are understood fully, which helps them notice what changes or tactics might need to be considered.

=== Know, Want to know, Learned ===
Know, Want to know, and Learned (KWL) is often used by teachers and their students, but it is a great tactic for all readers when considering their own knowledge. So, the reader goes through the knowledge that they already have, they think about what they want to know or the knowledge they want to gain, and finally they think about what they have learnt after reading. This allows readers to reflect on the prior knowledge they have, and also to recognize what knowledge they have gained and comprehended from their reading.

== Comprehension strategies ==
Research studies on reading and comprehension have shown that highly proficient, effective readers utilize a number of different strategies to comprehend various types of texts, strategies that can also be used by less proficient readers in order to improve their comprehension. These include:

1. Making Inferences: In everyday terms we refer to this as "reading between the lines". It involves connecting various parts of texts that are not directly linked in order to form a sensible conclusion. A form of assumption, the reader speculates what connections lie within the texts. They also make predictions about what might occur next.
2. Planning and Monitoring: This strategy centers around the reader's mental awareness and their ability to control their comprehension by way of awareness. By previewing text (via outlines, table of contents, etc.) one can establish a goal for reading: "what do I need to get out of this"? Readers use context clues and other evaluation strategies to clarify texts and ideas, and thus monitoring their level of understanding.
3. Asking Questions: To solidify one's understanding of passages of texts, readers inquire and develop their own opinion of the author's writing, character motivations, relationships, etc. This strategy involves allowing oneself to be completely objective in order to find various meanings within the text.
4. Self-Monitoring: Asking oneself questions about reading strategies, whether they are getting confused or having trouble paying attention.
5. Determining Importance: Pinpointing the important ideas and messages within the text. Readers are taught to identify direct and indirect ideas and to summarize the relevance of each.
6. Visualizing: With this sensory-driven strategy, readers form mental and visual images of the contents of text. Being able to connect visually allows for a better understanding of the text through emotional responses.
7. Synthesizing: This method involves marrying multiple ideas from various texts in order to draw conclusions and make comparisons across different texts; with the reader's goal being to understand how they all fit together.
8. Making Connections: A cognitive approach also referred to as "reading beyond the lines", which involves:
9. (A) finding a personal connection to reading, such as personal experience, previously read texts, etc. to help establish a deeper understanding of the context of the te xt, or (B) thinking about implications that have no immediate connection with the theme of the text.

== Assessment ==
There are informal and formal assessments to monitor an individual's comprehension ability and use of comprehension strategies. Informal assessments are generally conducted through observation and the use of tools, like story boards, word sorts, and interactive writing. Many teachers use Formative assessments to determine if a student has mastered content of the lesson. Formative assessments can be verbal as in a "Think-Pair-Share" or "Partner Share". Formative Assessments can also be "Ticket out the door" or "digital summarizers". Formal assessments are district or state assessments that evaluates all students on important skills and concepts. Summative assessments typically, are assessments given at the end of a unit to measure a student's learning.

=== Running records ===
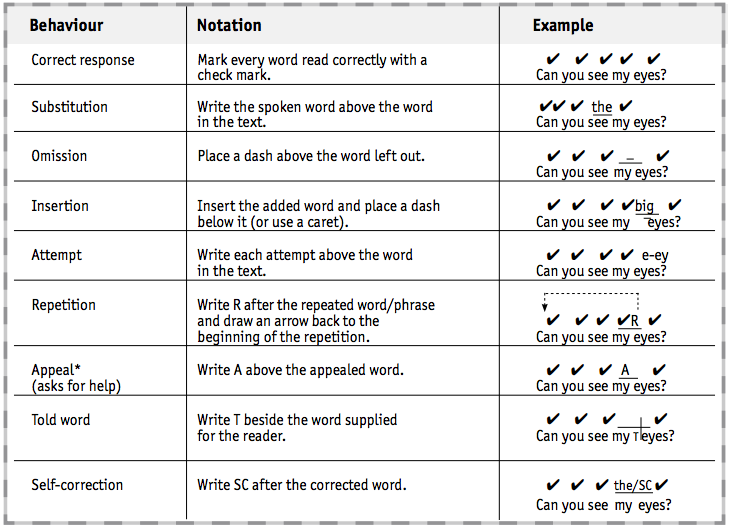
Running Record Codes

A popular assessment undertaken in numerous primary schools around the world are running records. Running records are a helpful tool in regard to reading comprehension. The tool assists teachers in analyzing specific patterns in student behaviors and planning appropriate instruction. By conducting running records, teachers are given an overview of students' reading abilities and learning over a period of time.

In order for teachers to conduct a running record properly, they must sit beside a student and make sure that the environment is as relaxed as possible so the student does not feel pressured or intimidated. It is best if the running record assessment is conducted during reading, to avoid distractions. Another alternative is asking an education assistant to conduct the running record for you in a separate room whilst you teach/supervise the class. Quietly observe the students' reading and record during this time. There is a specific code for recording which most teachers understand. Once the student has finished reading, ask them to retell the story as best as they can. After the completion of this, ask them comprehensive questions listed to test them on their understanding of the book. At the end of the assessment add up their running record score and file the assessment sheet away. After the completion of the running record assessment, plan strategies that will improve the students' ability to read and understand the text.

Overview of the steps taken when conducting a Running Record assessment:

1. Select the text
2. Introduce the text
3. Take a running record
4. Ask for retelling of the story
5. Ask comprehensive questions
6. Check fluency
7. Analyze the record
8. Plan strategies to improve students reading/understanding ability
9. File results away.

== Difficult or complex content ==
=== Reading difficult texts ===
Some texts, like in philosophy, literature or scientific research, may appear more difficult to read because of the prior knowledge they assume, the tradition from which they come, or the tone, such as criticizing or parodying. The philosopher Jacques Derrida explained his opinion about complicated text: "In order to unfold what is implicit in so many discourses, one would have each time to make a pedagogical outlay that is just not reasonable to expect from every book. Here the responsibility has to be shared out, mediated; the reading has to do its work and the work has to make its reader." Other Philosophers however, believe that if you have something to say, you should be able to make the message readable to a wide audience.

=== Hyperlinks ===
Embedded hyperlinks in documents or Internet pages have been found to make different demands on the reader than traditional text. Authors such as Nicholas Carr, and Psychologists, such as Maryanne Wolf, contend that the internet may have a negative impact on attention and reading comprehension. Some studies report increased demands of reading hyperlinked text in terms of cognitive load, or the amount of information actively maintained in one's mind (also see working memory). One study showed that going from about 5 hyperlinks per page to about 11 per page reduced college students' understanding (assessed by multiple choice tests) of articles about alternative energy. This can be attributed to the decision-making process (deciding whether to click on it) required by each hyperlink, which may reduce comprehension of surrounding text.

On the other hand, other studies have shown that if a short summary of the link's content is provided when the mouse pointer hovers over it, then comprehension of the text is improved. "Navigation hints" about which links are most relevant improved comprehension. Finally, the background knowledge of the reader can partially determine the effect hyperlinks have on comprehension. In a study of reading comprehension with subjects who were familiar or unfamiliar with art history, texts which were hyperlinked to one another hierarchically were easier for novices to understand than texts which were hyperlinked semantically. In contrast, those already familiar with the topic understood the content equally well with both types of organization.

In interpreting these results, it may be useful to note that the studies mentioned were all performed in closed content environments, not on the internet. That is, the texts used only linked to a predetermined set of other texts which was offline. Furthermore, the participants were explicitly instructed to read on a certain topic in a limited amount of time. Reading text on the internet may not have these constraints.

== Professional development ==
The National Reading Panel noted that comprehension strategy instruction is difficult for many teachers as well as for students, particularly because they were not taught this way and because it is a demanding task. They suggested that professional development can increase teachers/students willingness to use reading strategies but admitted that much remains to be done in this area.

The directed listening and thinking activity is a technique available to teachers to aid students in reading comprehension. It is also difficult for students that are new. There is often some debate when considering the relationship between reading fluency and reading comprehension. There is evidence of a direct correlation that fluency and comprehension lead to better understanding of the written material, across all ages. The National Assessment of Educational Progress assessed U.S. student performance in reading at grade 12 from both public and private school population and found that only 37 percent of students had proficient skills. The majority, 72 percent of the students, were only at or above basic skills, and 28 percent of the students were below basic level.

== See also ==
- Balanced literacy
- Baseball Study
- Directed listening and thinking activity
- English as a second or foreign language
- Fluency
- Levels-of-processing
- List of countries by literacy rate
- Phonics
- Programme for International Student Assessment
- Progress in International Reading Literacy Study
- Readability
- Reading
- Reading for special needs
- Science of reading
- Simple view of reading
- SQ3R
- Structured literacy
- Synthetic phonics
- Systematic phonics
- Whole language

== Sources ==
- Tompkins, Gail E. (2011). Literacy in the Early Grades: A Successful Start for Prek-4 Readers and Writers. Allyn and Bacon. ISBN 978-0-13-702787-3.
