= Word sort =

A word sort is a developmental word study activity espoused by the Words Their Way curriculum as written by Donald R. Bear, Marcia Invernizzi, Shane Templeton, and Francine Johnston. The activity focuses students' attention on critical features of words, namely sound, pattern, and meaning.

Recent descriptions of comprehensive vocabulary programs identify fostering word consciousness (getting students really interested in and excited about words) as a crucial component of effective programs. Word sorts are a method to foster word consciousness.

== Role of Word Sorts ==
The process of sorting words into various categories is the heart of word study. By categorizing different words by certain elements, young children make sense of words and patterns within words. Word sorts combine both constructivist learning and teacher-directed instruction.

Students receive a stack of cards containing either pictures or words that have several types of contrasting sounds, patterns, or meanings. Each student must then figure out the patterns that exist within the stack, and sort the cards accordingly. By doing this, students construct their own knowledge of words, creating a lasting understanding of how language works. This process contrasts greatly to the simple memorization related to traditional spelling tests.

The more students understand about the structure of words - their spelling or orthography - the more efficient and fluent their reading will be. Word sorts place instructional emphasis on the exploration of patterns that can be detected in the sound, structure, and meaning features of words. Thus, word sorts contribute to orthographic or spelling knowledge, the engine that drives efficient reading as well as efficient writing.

== Types of Sorts ==
There are three different types of word sorts: sound sorts, picture sorts, and word sorts.

=== Sound Sorts ===
Sound sorts can take on many forms in a primary classroom and this is essential because sound is the first layer of English orthography. Sound study can be introduced at a very early stage and develop with a child's individual ability. Sorting pictures or oral vocabulary is a manipulation of sounds, and this manipulation increases awareness. A simple introductory sort is by initial sound and this can develop to ending sound, vowel sounds, and word families sorts. The root of importance is student motivation and involvement in the sort. By “setting the scene with sounds," sorts may include concrete materials and pictures linked to learner interest. Phonemic awareness, not phonics, is the understanding that our spoken sounds work together to make words. This is a very early understanding that can be developed in a variety of ways. Comparing sounds is the easiest task for developing phonemic awareness. Sound sorts can be introduced very early on and develop strategically throughout primary learning.

An ability to sort sounds is essential for early reading because sound manipulation is a stepping stone to word study and decoding ability. For some students a direct instructional approach is not necessary in the development of sound study and sorting. Other children who have had less exposure or lack the understanding of sounds and their manipulability may need further instruction to develop their ability. Teachers have a responsibility to students they serve to identify their needs and implement instructional strategies to scaffold students’ understandings of sounds.

Intervention strategies may be necessary in remediating students who cannot correctly identify sounds in isolation on a given opportunity. Programs like Reading Recovery have contemporary phonemic techniques embedded in the program. Also, books and poems may specifically focus on word families and similar sound patterns for children to identify and understand in context. Sound sorts can be integrated through programs, or very inexpensively through teacher-created materials. For example, students can sort pictures by beginning sound, rhyme, or ending sound. Students do not need to have strong phonics skills in order to engage in sound sorts. This can be a beginning phonemic awareness activity because students need only to identify the sound in order to complete the sort. Letter knowledge is not required, and phonemic development can mature as students do acquire more print knowledge.

=== Picture Sorts ===
Picture sorts are one component of word study and are used to help beginning readers develop Concept of Word, phonological awareness, and phonics. Picture sorts most often begin with focusing on initial sound (single consonant, digraphs, or blends). By using picture sorts teachers are able to help students who do not have extensive reading vocabularies focus on isolated sounds (Initial, final, or medial) within a spoken word. These sorts are often a child's first introduction to word study and are most commonly used with students whose developmental skills are at the emergent, letter name-alphabetic, or early within word Spelling Stages.

=== Word Sorts ===
Word sort activities involve students comparing, contrasting, and classifying words - considering words from a variety of perspectives. Bear et al. emphasized the importance of comparing those words that do fit into a particular category with those that don't. This type of engagement with words will for most students lead to the abstraction of spelling patterns and the sounds to which they correspond.

Word sorts can be teacher directed (closed) or student directed (open). For example, students in the with-in-word pattern phase of word knowledge could sort words according to a vowel pattern; in such sorts there is always a miscellaneous category for words that do not follow the target categories.

cat	make	car	miscellaneous
mad	race	star	fall
flat	game	hard	ball
cap	place	mark	x
grab	plate	park	x

Game-like formats such as board games and card games can also be effective if they focus on words that reflect spelling patterns. Word-building activities also facilitate abstraction of pattern: word wheels, flip charts, making words. Spelling or word study notebooks may be used to record, collect, and organize information about words and spelling patterns learned from the word sort.

=== Digital Word Sorts ===
To complement the many 'hands on' activities students use for sorting words, digitized word sorts provide an efficient way for teachers to deliver spelling pattern differentiation. A variety of these are ready-made, including Word Sorter.

== Adjusting Word Sort Instruction for Students with Learning Problems ==
Research has shown that students who experience significant difficulty with spelling follow the same developmental course as other students, but do so at a slower pace. In such cases, it is critical to provide word sort words at the appropriate developmental level, regardless of the students' age and grade. Once the appropriate spelling instructional level is established - be it alphabetic, within-word pattern, or syllable juncture - instruction can be adapted by focusing on fewer words at a time, teaching spelling patterns in an explicit manner, and providing for copious amounts of practice and review.
