= Jane Stallings =

- Born: January 10, 1929
- Died: January 31, 2016 (aged 87)
- Education: Stanford University
- Occupation: Educational researcher
- Employer(s): Texas A&M University; University of Houston

Jane Ainel Smith Stallings (January 10, 1929 – January 31, 2016) was an American educational researcher and academic. She was the 1994–95 president of the American Educational Research Association (AERA) and the first female to become a dean at Texas A&M University.

== Early life and career ==
Jane Smith was born in Indiana; her parents were Indiana natives Howard and Ruth Pinkerton Smith. After earning an undergraduate degree at Ball State University, she worked as a teacher in Long Beach, California. She met Harold Stallings in Long Beach. The couple married and then had four children before they were divorced. She later married David Markham; she was predeceased by him in 2011. After her teaching stint in Long Beach, she earned an M.S. and a Ph.D. at Stanford University.

After working at the Stanford Research Institute, she held faculty positions at Vanderbilt University and the University of Houston. In 1990, she became the dean of the Texas A&M University College of Education. She had been planning to retire before she was presented with the opportunity at Texas A&M. The appointment made her the first female dean at the university. There she established the Dean's Roundtable, which featured leaders in education, and she started the Learning to Teach in Inner City Schools program.

Stallings was the 1994–95 AERA president. She was known as an authority on the measurement of teaching time in the classroom and had a special interest in teaching strategies directed toward inner-city youth.

== Later life ==
After retiring in 1999, Stallings pursued an interest in fiction writing. In 2011, she published a novel, Bridge to Survival. On January 13, 2016, Stallings died unexpectedly due to an aneurysm.
