= Reciprocal teaching =

Instructional method

Reciprocal teaching is an instructional method designed to foster reading comprehension through collaborative dialogue between educators and students. Rooted in the work of Annemarie Palincsar, this approach aims to improve reading in students using specific reading strategies, such as Questioning, Clarifying, Summarizing, and Predicting, to actively construct meaning from text.

Research indicates that reciprocal teaching promotes students' reading comprehension by encouraging active engagement and critical thinking during the reading process. By engaging in dialogue with teachers and peers, students deepen their understanding of text and develop essential literacy skills.

Reciprocal teaching unfolds as a collaborative dialogue where teachers and students take turns assuming the role of teacher (Palincsar, 1986). This interactive approach is most effective in small-group settings, facilitated by educators or reading tutors who guide students through the comprehension process.

In practice, reciprocal teaching empowers students to become active participants in their own learning, fostering a sense of ownership and responsibility for their academic success. By engaging in meaningful dialogue and employing specific reading strategies, students develop the skills necessary to comprehend and analyze complex texts effectively.

Reciprocal teaching is best represented as a dialogue between teachers and students in which participants take turns assuming the role of teacher.

Reciprocal teaching stands as a valuable tool for educators seeking to enhance students' reading comprehension skills. By fostering collaboration, critical thinking, and active engagement, this approach equips students with the tools they need to succeed academically and beyond.

Enhancing Reading Comprehension through Reciprocal Teaching

Reciprocal teaching is an evidence-based instructional approach designed to enhance reading comprehension by actively engaging students in four key strategies: predicting, clarifying, questioning, and summarizing. Coined as the "fab four" by Oczkus, these strategies empower students to take an active role in constructing meaning from text.

Predicting involves students making educated guesses about the content of the text before reading, activating prior knowledge and setting the stage for comprehension. Clarifying entails addressing areas of confusion or uncertainty by asking questions and seeking clarification from the teacher or peers. Questioning involves students generating questions about the text to deepen understanding and promote critical thinking. Summarizing requires students to synthesize key information from the text and articulate it in their own words, reinforcing comprehension and retention.

Throughout the reciprocal teaching process, teachers provide support and guidance to students, reinforcing their responses and facilitating meaningful dialogue. This collaborative approach fosters a supportive learning environment where students feel empowered to actively engage with text and construct meaning collaboratively.

Research suggests that reciprocal teaching is effective in improving reading comprehension across diverse student populations. By incorporating active engagement, dialogue, and metacognitive strategies, reciprocal teaching equips students with the skills they need to comprehend and analyze complex texts effectively.

== Role of reading strategies ==
Reciprocal teaching is an amalgamation of reading strategies that effective readers are thought to use. As stated by Pilonieta and Medina in their article "Reciprocal Teaching for the Primary Grades: We Can Do It, Too!", previous research conducted by Kincade and Beach (1996 ) indicates that proficient readers use specific comprehension strategies in their reading tasks, while poor readers do not. Proficient readers have well-practiced decoding and comprehension skills which allow them to proceed through texts somewhat automatically until some sort of triggering event alerts them to a comprehension failure.

This trigger can be anything from an unacceptable accumulation of unknown concepts to an expectation that has not been fulfilled by the text. Whatever the trigger, proficient readers react to a comprehension breakdown by using a number of strategies in a planned, deliberate manner. These "fix-up" strategies range from simply slowing down the rate of reading or decoding, to re-reading, to consciously summarizing the material. Once the strategy (or strategies) has helped to restore meaning in the text, the successful reader can proceed again without conscious use of the strategy.

All readers—no matter how skilled—occasionally reach cognitive failure when reading texts that are challenging, unfamiliar, or "inconsiderate"—i.e. structured or written in an unusual manner. Poor readers, on the other hand, do not demonstrate the same reaction when comprehension failure occurs. Some simply do not recognize the triggers that signal comprehension breakdown. Others are conscious that they do not understand the text, but do not have or are unable to employ strategies that help. Some use maladaptive strategies (such as avoidance) that do not aid in comprehension. Mayer notes in his paper on Learning Strategies that reciprocal teaching can help even novice learners become more adept at utilizing learning strategies and furthering their understanding of a subject. Mayer also notes that the reciprocal teaching process gives the students the chance to learn more by having the teachers as role models, and that the reciprocal teaching process gives beginners in an academic field a chance to learn from the experts by taking turns leading the class.

== Strategies ==
Reciprocal teaching, a cognitive strategy instruction approach introduced by Palincsar and Brown, offers a structured framework for guiding students through comprehension processes during reading. This approach aims to equip students with specific strategies to prevent cognitive failure and enhance comprehension. The four fundamental strategies identified by Palincsar and Brown are:

1. Questioning: Encourages students to generate questions about the text, promoting active engagement and deeper understanding. This strategy involves prompting students to pose questions about the content, characters, plot, or any unclear aspects of the text.
2. Clarifying: Helps students address confusion or gaps in understanding by identifying and resolving obstacles to comprehension. Students are encouraged to clarify unfamiliar vocabulary, concepts, or complex passages by using context clues, dictionaries, or seeking additional information.
3. Summarizing: Involves condensing the main ideas and key points of the text into concise summaries. Students learn to identify the most important information and organize it in their own words, fostering comprehension and retention.
4. Predicting: Encourages students to make educated guesses about what might happen next in the text based on prior knowledge, context clues, and textual evidence. This strategy engages students in active prediction-making, promoting anticipation and deeper engagement with the text.

Reciprocal teaching operates on the principle of "guided participation," where the teacher initially models the strategies, then gradually shifts responsibility to the students as they become more proficient. The process typically involves structured interactions between the teacher and small groups of students, with the teacher assuming the role of facilitator or "leader."

For instance, the leader might begin by modeling each strategy explicitly, demonstrating how to generate questions, clarify confusion, summarize key points, and make predictions based on the text. As students gain proficiency, they take turns assuming the role of leader within their small group, practicing and refining the strategies with guidance and feedback from their peers and the teacher.

By systematically integrating these comprehension-fostering and comprehension-monitoring strategies into their reading practices, students develop metacognitive awareness and become more adept at regulating their understanding of texts. This not only enhances their comprehension skills but also empowers them to become more independent and strategic readers over time.

=== Predicting ===
In the prediction phase of reciprocal teaching, readers actively engage in synthesizing their prior knowledge with the information gleaned from the text, projecting what might unfold next in the narrative or what additional insights they might encounter in informational passages (Doolittle et al., 2006). This predictive process not only encourages students to anticipate forthcoming events or information but also serves as a mechanism for them to confirm or refute their own hypotheses about the text's direction and the author's intentions.

Drawing upon the text's structure and their own cognitive schemas, students formulate hypotheses that guide their reading experience, providing a purposeful framework for comprehension. As Williams emphasizes, while predictions need not be infallible, they should be articulated clearly, allowing for ongoing dialogue and reflection within the reciprocal teaching framework.

During the prediction phase, the Predictor within the group may offer conjectures about the forthcoming content in informational texts or the progression of events in literary works. This collaborative process encourages students to actively contribute to the discussion and consider multiple perspectives.

The reciprocal teaching cycle continues with subsequent sections of text, wherein students cyclically engage in reading, questioning, clarifying, summarizing, and predicting. While these core strategies form the foundation of reciprocal teaching, variations and expansions have been introduced by practitioners to accommodate diverse reading materials and learning objectives.

For instance, additional reading strategies such as visualizing, making connections, inferencing, and questioning the author have been integrated into the reciprocal teaching format to further enhance students' comprehension and critical thinking skills. By incorporating a range of strategies tailored to the specific text and learning objectives, reciprocal teaching provides a flexible and comprehensive approach to literacy instruction. The sequence of reading, questioning, clarifying, summarizing, and predicting is then repeated with subsequent sections of text. Different reading strategies have been incorporated into the reciprocal teaching format by other practitioners. Some other reading strategies include visualizing, making connections, inferencing, and questioning the author.

=== Questioning ===
In the questioning phase of reciprocal teaching, readers engage in metacognitive reflection by monitoring their own comprehension and actively interrogating the text to deepen their understanding. This process of self-awareness fosters a deeper engagement with the material and facilitates the construction of meaning.

Central to the questioning strategy is the identification of key information, themes, and concepts within the text that merit further exploration. By discerning what is central or significant, readers can formulate questions that serve as checkpoints for their comprehension and guide their reading process.

The questions posed during the questioning phase serve multiple purposes, including clarifying unclear or puzzling parts of the text, making connections to previously learned concepts, and eliciting deeper insights. These questions prompt readers to actively interact with the text, encouraging them to consider its implications and relevance within a broader context.

Within the reciprocal teaching framework, the Questioner assumes the role of guiding the discussion by posing questions about the selection. This collaborative exchange allows students to collectively navigate through the text, addressing areas of confusion and probing for deeper understanding.

Questioning provides a structured context for exploring the text more deeply and constructing meaning. By actively interrogating the text through a series of thoughtful questions, readers develop a more nuanced understanding of its content and significance.

As students engage in reciprocal teaching, the questioning phase empowers them to take ownership of their learning process and develop essential critical thinking skills that extend beyond the confines of the classroom. Through the iterative process of questioning and exploration, readers cultivate a deeper appreciation for the complexities of text and become more proficient and independent learners

=== Clarifying ===
In the reciprocal teaching framework, the clarifying strategy serves as a targeted approach to address decoding challenges, unfamiliar vocabulary, and comprehension obstacles. By equipping students with specific decoding techniques and fix-up strategies, the clarifying phase empowers them to overcome difficulties and enhance their understanding of the text.

Central to the clarifying strategy is the identification and remediation of unclear or unfamiliar aspects of the text, including awkward sentence structures, unfamiliar vocabulary, ambiguous references, and complex concepts. By pinpointing these obstacles, students can employ various remedial actions, such as re-reading passages, using contextual clues, or consulting external resources like dictionaries or thesauruses.

The clarifying phase not only fosters metacognitive awareness but also motivates students to actively engage in the process of comprehension repair. By recognizing and addressing areas of confusion, students develop a sense of agency in navigating through challenging texts and constructing meaning.

Within the reciprocal teaching model, the Clarifier assumes the responsibility of addressing confusing parts of the text and providing responses to the questions posed by the group. This collaborative exchange encourages students to share their insights and perspectives, fostering a deeper understanding of the text through collective problem-solving.

The clarifying strategy promotes the development of strategic reading habits, such as chunking text for better comprehension, utilizing spelling patterns for decoding, and employing fix-up strategies to maintain concentration. By equipping students with these skills, reciprocal teaching empowers them to become more proficient and confident readers.

Through the clarifying phase, students not only enhance their comprehension skills but also cultivate a sense of ownership over their learning process. By actively engaging in the identification and resolution of comprehension obstacles, students develop resilience and adaptability in their approach to reading, laying the groundwork for lifelong learning and academic success.

In short, The Clarifier will address confusing parts and attempt to answer the questions that were just posed.

=== Summarizing ===
In reciprocal teaching, the summarizing strategy plays a pivotal role in helping students distill the essential information, themes, and ideas from a text into a concise and coherent statement. By discriminating between important and less-important information, students engage in a process of synthesis that enhances their comprehension and retention of the material.

At its core, summarizing involves the identification and integration of key elements of a text into a unified whole. This process requires students to extract the central ideas, main events, and significant details, while omitting extraneous or peripheral information. Through summarization, students create a framework for understanding the overarching message or purpose of the text.

Summarizing can occur at various levels of granularity, ranging from individual sentences to entire passages or chapters. Regardless of the scope, the goal remains consistent: to capture the essence of the text in a succinct and accessible manner. This not only reinforces students' understanding of the material but also facilitates their ability to communicate the main ideas to others.

Within the reciprocal teaching framework, the Summarizer takes on the responsibility of articulating the main idea of the text using their own words. This process encourages students to engage actively with the text, distilling complex information into manageable chunks and fostering a deeper comprehension of the material.

Summarizing provides students with a valuable tool for organizing and structuring their thoughts about a text. By encapsulating the key points in a concise statement, students develop a clearer understanding of the text's structure and significance, enabling them to make connections and draw inferences more effectively.

Through repeated practice, students refine their summarization skills, moving from summarizing at the sentence level to paragraphs and eventually entire texts. This iterative process not only strengthens their comprehension abilities but also builds their confidence as independent readers and critical thinkers.

In short, The Summarizer will use his/her own words to tell the main idea of the text. This can happen anywhere in the story, and it should happen often for those students who are at-risk. It can happen first at sentence level, then paragraphs, then to whole text.

== Instructional format ==
Reciprocal teaching follows a dialogic/dialectic process. Derber wrote that there were two reasons for choosing dialogue as the medium. First, it is a language format with which children are familiar (as opposed to writing, which may be too difficult for some struggling readers). Second, dialogue provides a useful vehicle for alternating control between teacher and students in a systematic and purposeful manner.

Reciprocal teaching illustrates a number of unique ideas for teaching and learning and is based on both developmental and cognitive theories. The strategies embedded in reciprocal teaching represent those that successful learners engage in while interacting with text. They are thought to encourage self-regulation and self-monitoring and promote intentional learning.

Reciprocal teaching also follows a very scaffolded curve, beginning with high levels of teacher instruction, modeling, and input, which is gradually withdrawn to the point that students are able to use the strategies independently. Reciprocal teaching begins with the students and teacher reading a short piece of text together. In the beginning stages, the teacher models the "Fab Four" strategies required by reciprocal teaching, and teacher and students share in conversation to come to a mutual agreement about the text. The teacher then specifically and explicitly models his or her thinking processes out loud, using each of the four reading strategies. Students follow the teacher's model with their own strategies, also verbalizing their thought processes for the other students to hear.

Over time, the teacher models less and less frequently as students become more adept and confident with the strategies. Eventually, responsibility for leading the small-group discussions of the text and the strategies is handed over to the students. This gives the teacher or reading tutor the opportunity to diagnose strengths, weaknesses, misconceptions, and to provide follow-up as needed.

Reciprocal teaching encompasses several techniques involving the who, what, and where, of learning:

- What is learned are cognitive strategies for reading comprehension rather than specific facts and procedures. The teaching focuses on how to learn rather than what to learn.
- Learning of the cognitive strategies occurs within real reading comprehension tasks rather than having each strategy taught in isolation. Learning takes place in an order, rather than learning everything separately.
- Students learn as apprentices within a cooperative learning group that is working together on a task. The students are learning through themselves, and through the others in their group.

== Vygotsky connection ==
Reciprocal teaching aligns closely with Lev Vygotsky's theories on the interconnectedness of language, cognition, and learning, as outlined in his seminal work "Thought and Language". Vygotsky emphasized the profound connection between oral language development and cognitive growth, highlighting the pivotal role of social interactions in shaping individuals' thinking processes. This perspective finds additional support in the concept of "Learning by Teaching", where learners solidify their understanding of a subject matter by teaching it to others.

Central to Vygotsky's framework is the notion of the zone of proximal development (ZPD)., which represents the space between what learners can achieve independently and what they can accomplish with guidance and support from more knowledgeable individuals. Reciprocal teaching operates within this zone by providing structured support and scaffolding to help students bridge the gap between their current abilities and the desired comprehension level. This process mirrors Vygotsky's idea of scaffolding, wherein temporary assistance is provided to learners as they engage in tasks just beyond their current level of competence, with the ultimate goal of fostering independent mastery.

The iterative nature of reciprocal teaching, characterized by the gradual reduction of teacher support as students gain proficiency, reflects the principles of cognitive apprenticeship proposed by Collins, Brown, and Newman. This approach involves modeling, coaching, and gradually fading support, allowing learners to internalize and apply comprehension strategies autonomously. Thus, reciprocal teaching embodies Vygotsky's emphasis on the social and collaborative nature of learning, providing a framework for meaningful interaction and cognitive growth within the educational context.

== Current Uses ==
The reciprocal teaching model has been in use for the past 20 years and has been adopted by a number of school districts and reading intervention programs across the United States and Canada. It has also been used as the model for a number of commercially produced reading programs such as Soar to Success, Connectors, Into Connectors. Unfortunately, according to Williams, most students and teachers in this country have "never even heard of it". Available from Global Ed in New Zealand is the Connectors and Into Connectors Series written by Jill Eggleton. These two series have both non fiction and fiction text. Abrams Learning Trends publishers Key Links Peer Readers by Jill Eggleton (2016)

Reciprocal teaching is also being adopted and researched in countries other than the United States. For example, Yu-Fen Yang of Taiwan conducted a study to develop a reciprocal teaching/learning strategy in remedial English reading classes. Yang's study concluded that "...students expressed that they observed and learned from the teacher's or their peers’ externalization of strategy usage. Students’ reading progress in the remedial instruction incorporating the RT system was also identified by the pre- and post-tests. This study suggests that there may be benefits for teachers in encouraging students to interact with others in order to clarify and discuss comprehension questions and constantly monitor and regulate their own reading".

Reciprocal teaching has also been implemented in Singaporean secondary schools. A SingTeach report by Ravinder Mohan Sharma describes a five-week implementation of reciprocal teaching in two upper-secondary English classes. The report also noted that students responded positively to the approach.

In a 2008 study presented effective implementation of reciprocal teaching to students diagnosed with mild to moderate forms of disability. Within this group, ten percent of students had difficulty in learning due to Down Syndrome. The average of the participants was around eighteen years of age. The researchers, Miriam Alfassi, Itzhak Weiss, and Hefziba Lifshitz, developed a study based on Palincsar and Brown's design of reciprocal teaching for students who were considered academically too low for the complex skills of reading comprehension. The study compared two styles of teaching, remediation/direct instruction to Palincsar/Brown reciprocal teaching. After twelve weeks of instruction and assessments, reciprocal teaching was found to produce a greater success rate in improving the literacy skills in the participants with mild to moderate learning disabilities. After the study was completed, researchers recommended reciprocal teaching so that students are taught in an interactive environment that includes meaningful and connected texts. This research for the European Journal of Special Needs Education, promotes reciprocal teaching for its structure in dialogues and how students learn to apply those dialogues based on the reading taking place in instruction.

Research in the United States has also been conducted on the use of reciprocal teaching in primary grades. Pilonieta and Medina conducted a series of procedures to implement their version of reciprocal teaching in elementary school students. The researchers adopted an age-appropriate model for reciprocal teaching and called it "Reciprocal Teaching for the Primary Grades", or RTPG. Their research shows that even in younger children, reciprocal teaching apparently benefited the students and they showed retention of the RTPG when re-tested six months later.

Reciprocal teaching has been heralded as effective in helping students improve their reading ability in pre-post trials or research studies. Further trials employing Reciprocal Teaching have consistently indicated the technique promotes reading comprehension as measured on standardized reading tests.

Recent research continues to underscore the efficacy of reciprocal teaching in enhancing reading comprehension skills. For instance, a study by Lee and colleagues investigated the impact of reciprocal teaching on adolescent readers' comprehension in a digital learning environment. They found that students who received reciprocal teaching instruction demonstrated significantly higher levels of comprehension compared to those in traditional instruction settings, highlighting the adaptability of the strategy to modern educational contexts.
