= Interactive writing =

Interactive writing has been described by Swartz (2001) as "a teaching method in which children and teacher negotiate what they are going to write and then share the pen to construct the message." Interactive writing is a cooperative event in which text is jointly composed and written. The teacher uses the interactive writing session to model reading and writing strategies as he or she engages children in creating text.

Interactive writing was also included by Irene Fountas and Gay Su Pinnell as part of their balanced literacy framework. Similar to shared writing, interactive writing allows a teacher and students to literally "share the pen" to create a joint sentence or message. Typically used in the primary grades, interactive writing is a powerful instructional medium for teaching phonics, spelling principles, rimes, writing conventions, and other key early writing skills.

Others have described interactive writing differently as a method used in literacy teaching, especially for young children, whereby the students have the opportunity to practice their reading, studying and writing skills in a safe and creative environment.

In this method the teacher(s) and students write to each other, by means of letters, dialogue journals or a message board. The students are free to choose the topic and the length of their writings. The teachers respond without correcting or criticising the spelling, grammar or writing style, but rather modelling more appropriate forms of writing.

The aim of this method is to allow children to see literacy as something meaningful and enjoyable, rather than a mind-numbing school activity. The focus is on fluency rather than accuracy. The principle behind it is 'write to learn, not learn to write'. As such, it relates to the learner-centered whole language approach.

The interactive writing method has been described in books such as:

- Students and teachers writing together : perspectives on journal writing. Joy Kreeft Peyton, Teachers of English to Speakers of Other Languages. Alexandria, Va., USA: Teachers of English to Speakers of Other Languages. 1990. ISBN 0-939791-36-6. OCLC 21794822.
- Robinson, Anne (1991). Some day you will no [sic] all about me : young children's explorations in the world of letters. Leslie W. Crawford, Nigel Hall. Portsmouth, N.H.: Heinemann. ISBN 0-435-08549-2. OCLC 22493006.
