= Guided reading =

Reading technique

Guided reading is "small-group reading instruction designed to provide differentiated teaching that supports students in developing reading proficiency". The small group model allows students to be taught in a way that is intended to be more focused on their specific needs, accelerating their progress.

The approach has been questioned for its efficacy and is increasingly faced with scrutiny since reporting by Emily Hanford in “Sold a Story” during 2022-2023 and more recently in a New Yorker Article about the poor research behind these methods.

In a recent example, a Michigan school district that implemented one of these approaches saw their scores drop 2x faster during the pandemic than the statewide average. https://www.michigancapitolconfidential.com/news/reading-scores-plummeted-as-michigan-schools-adopted-now-discredited-curriculum

== Introduction ==
Guided reading was introduced as a method of teaching reading in England and Wales in 1993, through the influence of the National Literacy Strategy (later superseded by the Primary National Strategy). It is no longer supported by the Primary National Strategy from England's Department for Education.

In the United States, Guided Reading is a key component to the Reading Workshop model of literacy instruction. Guided Reading sessions involve a teacher and a small group of two to four children although groups of five or six are not uncommon. The session would have a set of objectives to be taught during a session lasting approximately 20 minutes. While guided reading takes place with one group of children, the remaining children are engaged in quality independent or group literacy tasks with the aim of allowing the teacher to focus the small group without interruption. Guided Reading is usually a daily activity in English and Welsh primary school classrooms and it involves every child in a class over the course of a week. In the United States, Guided Reading can take place at both the primary and intermediate levels. Each Guided Reading group meets with the teacher several times throughout a given week. The children are typically grouped by academic ability, Fountas and Pinnell reading levels, or strategic/skill-based needs.

There is a lack of research on Guided Reading but some studies have found it to be beneficial for students. In South Africa, The Literacy Leadership Project were able to let four Foundation Phase teachers implement Guided Reading for students of the Aregorogeng Primary School. Over the course of eight months, results were able to demonstrate an improvement in student's engagement and motivation on literacy. Another study from Canada indicated that about 80% of 25 middle school students who received Guided Reading had an increase in reading proficiency.

Although, there are positive aspects to this type of reading instruction, there are also two main challenges that exist at every grade level. According to Irene Fountas and Gay Su Pinnell, "some students will work on very basic reading skills such as word analysis and comprehending simple texts" while other students may be working on more advanced reading skills and strategies with increasingly challenging texts. In addition, "all students need instructional support so they can expand their competence across a greater variety of increasingly challenging texts". Thus, it takes a lot of strong planning and organization from the part of the teacher in order to successfully implement Guided Reading so that it meets the needs of all learners. Simultaneously, "a teacher's goal is to strive to provide the most effective instruction possible and to match the difficulty of the material with the student's current abilities. Materials should provide a challenge that is 'just right' for the students". Guided Reading is a complex approach and teachers are essential in the development and execution of a Balanced Literacy program.

A critical component of the Reading Workshop is text selection; it must be purposeful and have the needs of the learners in mind. According to Fountas and Pinnell, as a teacher reads "a text in preparation for teaching, you decide what demands the text will make on the processing systems of the readers." Texts should not be chosen to simply teach a specific strategy but rather, the texts should be of such high quality that students can apply a wide range of reading comprehension strategies throughout the reading. "One text offers many opportunities to learn; you must decide how to mediate the text to guide your students' learning experiences".

=== Steps for a lesson ===
Before reading: a teacher will access background knowledge, build schema, set a purpose for reading, and preview the text with students. Typically, a group will engage in a variety of pre-reading activities such as predicting, learning new vocabulary, and discussing various text features. If applicable, the group may also engage in completing a "picture walk". This activity involves scanning through the text to look at pictures and predicting how the story will go. The students will engage in a conversation about the story, raise questions, build expectations, and notice information in the text.

During reading: the students will read independently within the group. As students read, the teacher will monitor student decoding and comprehending. The teacher may ask students if something makes sense, encourage students to try something again, or prompt them to use a strategy. The teacher makes observational notes about the strategy use by individual readers and may also take a short running record of the child's reading. The students may read the whole text or a part of the text silently or softly for beginning readers.

After reading: following the reading, the teacher will again check students' comprehension by talking about the story with the children. The teacher returns to the text for teaching opportunities such as finding evidence or discussing problem solving. The teacher also uses this time to assess the students' understanding of what they have read. The group will also discuss reading strategies they used during the reading, to extend the reading, students may participate in activities such as drama, writing, art, or more reading.

== Features commonly found in a 'Guided Reading' session ==
- Book Introduction

Adult with group. Prepare the children by providing support through reading the title, talking about the type of text, looking at the pictures and accessing previous knowledge. The aim is to give them confidence without reading the book to them, If necessary, locate and preview difficult new words and unfamiliar concepts or names. Various books/genres can be used.

- Strategy Check

Adult with group. Introduce or review specific reading strategies that the children have been taught and remind them to use these when reading.

- Independent Reading

Individuals. Children read the book at their pace, monitor individuals, and use appropriate prompts to encourage problem-solving and correct use of reading strategies.

- Returning to the Text

Adult with group. Briefly talk about what has been read to check children's understanding and encourage correct use of reading strategies.

- Response to the Text

Adult with group. Encourage children to respond to the book either through a short discussion where they express opinions, or through providing follow-up activities.

- Re-reading Guided Text

"Individuals." Provide a 'familiar book' box for each group, containing texts recently used in Guided Reading. Children can re-read texts to themselves or with a partner as an independent activity to give them opportunities to develop fluency and expression and build up reading miles.

== Models ==
There are three models of guided reading that can be used, it is based on the above structure depending on the National Curriculum (NC) level that the group is reading. These models do overlap;

=== Early model ===
This model is used for children who are reading up to about NC level 1A/2C. In this model, the book introduction, strategy check, independent reading, return to text and response to text all take place generally within one session. This is aided by the fact that the books suitable for children reading at this stage are very scarce.

=== Transitional model ===
This model is used for children who are reading at NC level 2C to 3C/B. Generally, two guided sessions will be needed to read a book. The first session mainly focuses on the book introduction, strategy check and independent reading. Whilst children are reading at their pace, it is important to start to introduce an element of silent reading to develop the skills of making meaning when reading independently because books at this stage are mostly longer, and it is not possible to read the whole book in one session. Once the children have done some reading in the session, then they can be asked to read the rest of the book before the second session. This session focuses on returning to the text and responding to the text, which are for the more able children and not those at level 1.

=== Fluent model ===
Readers working at a NC level of 3B upwards will need the fluent model of guided reading. At this level, it is not necessary for children to read the text during the guided sessions, children can generally decode the words. What is important is that they discuss the meaning that they make from the text, which will form the basis of the discussion. Therefore, the session tends to focus on return to text, and response to the text, with the strategy check implicit in the discussions.

== See also ==
- Compulsory reading
- Learning to read
- Phonics
- Shared reading
- Whole language
