= Self-efficacy =

Psychology concept

In psychology, self-efficacy is an individual's belief in their capacity to act in the ways necessary to reach specific goals. The concept was originally proposed by the psychologist Albert Bandura in 1977.

Self-efficacy affects every area of human endeavor. By determining the beliefs a person holds regarding their power to affect situations, self-efficacy strongly influences both the power a person actually has to face challenges competently and the choices a person is most likely to make. These effects are particularly apparent, and compelling, with regard to investment behaviors such as in health, education, and economic development.

A strong sense of self-efficacy promotes human accomplishment and personal well-being. A person with high self-efficacy views challenges as things that are supposed to be mastered rather than threats to avoid. These people are able to recover from failure faster and are more likely to attribute failure to a lack of effort. They approach threatening situations with the belief that they can control them. These things have been linked to lower levels of stress and a lower vulnerability to depression.

In contrast, people with a low sense of self-efficacy view difficult tasks as personal threats and are more likely to avoid these tasks as these individuals lack the confidence in their own skills and abilities. Difficult tasks lead them to look at the skills they lack rather than the ones they have, and they are therefore not motivated to set, pursue, and achieve their goals as they believe that they will fall short of success. It is easy for them to give up and to lose faith in their own abilities after a failure, resulting in a longer recovery process from these setbacks and delays. Low self-efficacy can be linked to higher levels of stress and depression.

== Theoretical approaches ==
=== Social cognitive theory ===
Psychologist Albert Bandura has defined self-efficacy as one's belief in one's ability to succeed in specific situations or accomplish a task. One's sense of self-efficacy can play a major role in how one approaches goals, tasks, and challenges. The theory of self-efficacy lies at the center of Bandura's social cognitive theory, which emphasizes the role of observational learning and social experience in the development of personality. The main concept in social cognitive theory is that an individual's actions and reactions, including social behaviors and cognitive processes, in almost every situation are influenced by the actions that individual has observed in others. Because self-efficacy is developed from external experiences and self-perception and is influential in determining the outcome of many events, it is an important aspect of social cognitive theory. Self-efficacy represents the personal perception of external social factors. According to Bandura's theory, people with high self-efficacy—that is, those who believe they can perform well—are more likely to view difficult tasks as something to be mastered rather than something to be avoided. A person's perception of their efficaciousness can influence their behavior and determine whether or not they try to complete a task, how often they try at these tasks, how much time and effort they put into these tasks. Furthermore, perceptions can influence a person's feelings and can either encourage or discourage one's behavior and affect self-efficacy.

=== Social learning theory ===
Social learning theory describes the acquisition of skills that are developed exclusively or primarily within a social group. Social learning depends on how individuals either succeed or fail at dynamic interactions within groups, and promotes the development of individual emotional and practical skills as well as accurate perception of self and acceptance of others. According to this theory, people learn from one another through observation, imitation, and modeling. Self-efficacy reflects an individual's understanding of what skills they can offer in a group setting.

=== Self-concept theory ===
Self-concept theory seeks to explain how people perceive and interpret their own existence from clues they receive from external sources, focusing on how these impressions are organized and how they are active throughout life. Successes and failures are closely related to the ways in which people have learned to view themselves and their relationships with others. This theory describes self-concept as learned (i.e., not present at birth); organized (in the way it is applied to the self); and dynamic (i.e., ever-changing, and not fixed at a certain age).

=== Attribution theory ===
Attribution theory focuses on how people attribute events and how those beliefs interact with self-perception. Attribution theory defines three major elements of cause:

- Locus is the location of the perceived cause. If the locus is internal (dispositional), feelings of self-esteem and self-efficacy will be enhanced by success and diminished by failure.
- Stability describes whether the cause is perceived as static or dynamic over time. It is closely related to expectations and goals, in that when people attribute their failures to stable factors such as the difficulty of a task, they will expect to fail in that task in the future.
- Controllability describes whether a person feels actively in control of the cause. Failing at a task one thinks one cannot control can lead to feelings of humiliation, shame, and anger.

== Sources of self-efficacy ==
=== Mastery experiences ===
According to Bandura, the most effective way to build self-efficacy is to engage in mastery experiences. These mastery experiences can be defined as a personal experience of success. Achieving difficult goals in the face of adversity helps build confidence and strengthen perseverance.

=== Vicarious experiences of social models ===
Another source of self-efficacy is through vicarious experiences of social models. Seeing someone, who you view as similar to yourself, succeed at something difficult can motivate you to believe that you have the skills necessary to achieve a similar goal. However, the inverse of the previous statement is true as well. Seeing someone fail at a task can lead to doubt in personal skills and abilities. "The greater the assumed similarity, the more persuasive are the models' successes and failures."

=== Belief in success ===
A third source of self-efficacy is found through strengthening the belief that one has the ability to succeed. Those who are positively persuaded that they have the ability to complete a given task show a greater and more sustained effort to complete a task. It also lowers the effect of self-doubt in a person. However, those who are doing the encouraging, put the person in a situation where success is more often likely to be attained. If they are put in a situation prematurely with no hope of any success, it can undermine self-efficacy.

=== Physiological and psychological states ===
A person's emotional and physiological state can also influence an individual's belief about their ability to perform in a given situation. When judging their own capabilities, people will often take in information from their body; how a person interprets that information impacts self-efficacy. For example, in activities that require physical strength, someone may take fatigue or pain as an indicator of inability or of effort.

== How it affects human function ==
=== Choices regarding behavior ===
People generally avoid tasks where self-efficacy is low, but undertake tasks where self-efficacy is high. When self-efficacy is significantly beyond actual ability, it leads to an overestimation of the ability to complete tasks. On the other hand, when self-efficacy is significantly lower than actual ability, it discourages growth and skill development. Research shows that the optimum level of self-efficacy is slightly above ability; in this situation, people are most encouraged to tackle challenging tasks and gain experience. Self-efficacy is made of dimensions like magnitude, strength, and generality to explain how one believes they will perform on a specific task.

=== Motivation ===
High self-efficacy can affect motivation in both positive and negative ways. In general, people with high self-efficacy are more likely to make efforts to complete a task, and to persist longer in those efforts, than those with low self-efficacy. The stronger the self-efficacy or mastery expectations, the more active the efforts.

A negative effect of low self-efficacy is that it can lead to a state of learned helplessness. Learned helplessness was studied by Martin Seligman in an experiment in which shocks were applied to animals. Through the experiment, it was discovered that the animals placed in a cage where they could escape shocks by moving to a different part of the cage did not attempt to move if they had formerly been placed in a cage in which escape from the shocks was not possible. Low self-efficacy can lead to this state in which it is believed that no amount of effort will make a difference in the success of the task at hand.

=== Work performance ===
Self-efficacy theory has been embraced by management scholars and practitioners because of its applicability in the workplace. Overall, self-efficacy is positively and strongly related to work-related performance as measured by the weighted average correlation across 114 selected studies. The strength of the relationship, though, is moderated by both task complexity and environmental context. For more complex tasks, the relationships between self-efficacy and work performance is weaker than for easier work-related tasks. In actual work environments, which are characterized by performance constraints, ambiguous demands, deficient performance feedback, and other complicating factors, the relationship appears weaker than in controlled laboratory settings. The implications of this research is that managers should provide accurate descriptions of tasks and provide clear and concise instructions. Moreover, they should provide the necessary supporting elements, including training employees in developing their self-efficacy in addition to task-related skills, for employees to be successful. It has also been suggested that managers should factor in self-efficacy when trying to decide candidates for developmental or training programs. It has been found that those who are high in self-efficacy learn more, which leads to higher job performance.

A study presents a new questionnaire called Work Agentic Capabilities (WAC) that measures the four agentic capabilities in the organizational context: forethought, self-regulation, self-reflection, and vicarious capability. The WAC questionnaire was validated through exploratory and confirmatory factor analyses, and it was found to be positively correlated with psychological capital, positive job attitudes, proactive organizational behaviors, perceived job performance, and promotion prospects. The study concludes that the WAC questionnaire can reliably measure agentic capabilities and can be useful in understanding the sociodemographic and organizational differences in mean values of agentic capabilities.

=== Thought patterns and responses ===
Self-efficacy has several effects on thought patterns and responses:

- Low self-efficacy can lead people to believe tasks to be harder than they actually are, while high self-efficacy can lead people to believe tasks to be easier than they are. This often results in poor task planning, as well as increased stress.
- People become erratic and unpredictable when engaging in a task in which they have low self-efficacy.
- People with high self-efficacy tend to take a wider view of a task in order to determine the best plan.
- Obstacles often stimulate people with high self-efficacy to greater efforts, where someone with low self-efficacy will tend toward discouragement and giving up.
- A person with high self-efficacy will attribute failure to external factors, where a person with low self-efficacy will blame low ability. For example, someone with high self-efficacy in regards to mathematics may attribute a poor test grade to a harder-than-usual test, illness, lack of effort, or insufficient preparation. A person with a low self-efficacy will attribute the result to poor mathematical ability.

=== Health behaviors ===
A number of studies on the adoption of health practices have measured self-efficacy to assess its potential to initiate behavior change. With increased self-efficacy, individuals have greater confidence in their ability and thus are more likely to engage in healthy behaviors. Greater engagement in healthy behaviors, result in positive patient health outcomes such as improved quality of life. Choices affecting health (such as smoking, physical exercise, dieting, condom use, dental hygiene, seat belt use, and breast self-examination) are dependent on self-efficacy. Self-efficacy beliefs are cognitions that determine whether health behavior change will be initiated, how much effort will be expended, and how long it will be sustained in the face of obstacles and failures. Self-efficacy influences how high people set their health goals (e.g., "I intend to reduce my smoking", or "I intend to quit smoking altogether").

=== Relationship to locus of control ===
Bandura showed that difference in self-efficacy correlates to fundamentally different world views. People with high self-efficacy generally believe that they are in control of their own lives, that their own actions and decisions shape their lives, while people with low self-efficacy may see their lives as outside their control. For example, a student with high self-efficacy who does poorly on an exam will likely attribute the failure to the fact that they did not study enough. However, a student with low self-efficacy who does poorly on an exam is likely to believe the cause of that failure was due to the test being too difficult or challenging, which the student does not control.

=== Factors affecting self-efficacy ===
Bandura identifies four factors affecting self-efficacy.

1. Experience, or "enactive attainment" – The experience of mastery is the most important factor determining a person's self-efficacy. Success raises self-efficacy, while failure lowers it. According to psychologist Erik Erikson: "Children cannot be fooled by empty praise and condescending encouragement. They may have to accept artificial bolstering of their self-esteem in lieu of something better, but what I call their accruing ego identity gains real strength only from wholehearted and consistent recognition of real accomplishment, that is, achievement that has meaning in their culture."
2. Modeling, or "vicarious experience" – Modeling is experienced as, "If they can do it, I can do it as well". When we see someone succeeding, our own self-efficacy increases; where we see people failing, our self-efficacy decreases. This process is most effectual when we see ourselves as similar to the model. Although not as influential as direct experience, modeling is particularly useful for people who are particularly unsure of themselves.
3. Social persuasion – Social persuasion generally manifests as direct encouragement or discouragement from another person. Discouragement is generally more effective at decreasing a person's self-efficacy than encouragement is at increasing it.
4. Physiological factors – In stressful situations, people commonly exhibit signs of distress: shakes, aches and pains, fatigue, fear, nausea, etc. Perceptions of these responses in oneself can markedly alter self-efficacy. Getting "butterflies in the stomach" before public speaking will be interpreted by someone with low self-efficacy as a sign of inability, thus decreasing self-efficacy further, where high self-efficacy would lead to interpreting such physiological signs as normal and unrelated to ability. It is one's belief in the implications of physiological response that alters self-efficacy, rather than the physiological response itself.

== Genetic and environmental determinants ==
In a Norwegian twin study, the heritability of self-efficacy in adolescents was estimated at 75 percent. The remaining variance, 25 percent, was due to environmental influences not shared between family members. The shared family environment did not contribute to individual differences in self-efficacy. The twins reared-together design may overestimate the effect of genetic influences and underestimate shared environmental influences because variables measured on the family level are modeled to be equal for both twins and thus cannot be separated into genetic and environmental components. Employing an alternative design, namely that of adoptive siblings, Buchanan et al. found significant shared environmental effects.

Self-efficacy was also found to be influenced by environmental factors like cultural context, home environment and educational environment. For example, parents provide their children with sets of aspirations, role models and expectations, and form beliefs about their children's abilities. Parents' beliefs are communicated to their children and affect the children's own ability beliefs. The classroom environment can also influence the students' self-efficacy through the amount and type of teacher attention, social comparisons, the tasks, the grading system and more. These are often influenced by school environment, including its culture and its educational philosophy. Studies showed that school environment influences the way the four sources of self-efficacy shape students' academic self-efficacy. For example, in different school systems - Democratic schools, Waldorf schools and mainstream public schools - there were differences in the way academic self-efficacy changed along grade levels, as well as variations in the roles of the various sources of self-efficacy. Both parental and educational environments are embedded in wider cultural contexts which influence the way self-efficacy is formed. For example, the mathematics self-efficacy of students from collectivist cultures was found to be more influenced by vicarious experiences and social persuasions than self-efficacy of students from individualist cultures.

== Theoretical models of behavior ==
A theoretical model of the effect of self-efficacy on transgressive behavior was developed and verified in research with school children.

=== Prosociality and moral disengagement ===
Prosocial behavior (such as helping others, sharing, and being kind and cooperative) and moral disengagement (manifesting in behaviors such as making excuses for bad behavior, avoiding responsibility for consequences, and blaming the victim) are negatively correlated. Academic, social, and self-regulatory self-efficacy encourages prosocial behavior, and thus helps prevent moral disengagement.

=== Over-efficaciousness in learning ===
In low-performing students, self-efficacy is not a self-fulfilling prophecy. Over-efficaciousness or 'illusional' efficacy discourages the critical examination of one's practices, therefore inhibiting professional learning. One study, which included 101 lower-division Portuguese students at U.T. Austin, examined the foreign students' beliefs about learning, goal attainment, and motivation to continue with language study. It was concluded that over-efficaciousness negatively affected student motivation, so that students who believed they were "good at languages" had less motivation to study.

=== Health behavior change ===
Social-cognitive models of health behavior change cast self-efficacy as predictor, mediator, or moderator. As a predictor, self-efficacy is supposed to facilitate the forming of behavioral intentions, the development of action plans, and the initiation of action. As mediator, self-efficacy can help prevent relapse to unhealthy behavior. As a moderator, self-efficacy can support the translation of intentions into action. See Health action process approach.

== Possible applications ==
=== Academic contexts ===
Parents' sense of academic efficacy for their child is linked to their children's scholastic achievement. If the parents have higher perceived academic capabilities and aspirations for their child, the child itself will share those same beliefs. This promotes academic self-efficacy for the child, and in turn, leads to scholastic achievement. It also leads to prosocial behavior, and reduces vulnerability to feelings of futility and depression. There is a relationship between low self-efficacy and depression.

Academic self-efficacy can be a predicting factor that affects academic burnout in students. Self-efficacy can affect the amount of effort made in dealing with obstacles and how stressful the situation is due to the demands of the situation.

In a study, the majority of a group of students questioned felt they had difficulty with listening in class situations. Instructors then helped strengthen their listening skills by making them aware about how the use of different strategies could produce better outcomes. This way, their levels of self-efficacy were improved as they continued to figure out what strategies worked for them.

=== STEM ===
Self-efficacy has proven especially useful for helping undergraduate students to gain insights into their career development in STEM fields. Researchers have reported that mathematics self-efficacy is more predictive of mathematics interest, choice of math-related courses, and math majors than past achievements in math or outcome expectations.

Self-efficacy theory has been applied to the career area to examine why women are underrepresented in male-dominated STEM fields such as mathematics, engineering, and science. It was found that gender differences in self-efficacy expectancies importantly influence the career-related behaviors and career choices of young women.

Technical self-efficacy was found to be a crucial factor for teaching computer programming to school students, as students with higher levels of technological self-efficacy achieve higher learning outcomes. The effect of technical self-efficacy was found to be even stronger than the effect of gender.

Self-efficacy has been shown to be influenced by different instructional approaches in science teaching. Learning about a scientific topic generally results in higher self-efficacy. Self-regulatory and metacognitive approaches that address students' conceptions additionally result in calibrated self-efficacy beliefs, meaning that students' beliefs about their abilities and their actual abilities are on the same level.

=== Writing ===
Writing studies research indicates a strong relationship linking perceived self-efficacy to motivation and performance outcomes. Students' academic accomplishments are inextricably connected to their self-thought of efficacy and constructed motivation within their contexts. The resilient efforts that highly self-efficacious individuals exert usually enable them to face the challenge and produce high-performance achievements. Besides, individuals place more value on the academic activities which they used to achieve success Recent writing research accentuated this connection between writers' self-efficacy, motivation and efforts offered, and achieving success in writing. In another way, writers with a high level of confidence in their writing capabilities and processes are more willing to work persistently for satisfying and effective writing. In contrast, those who have less sense of efficacy are unable to resist any failure and tend to avoid what they believe it as a painful experience - writing. There is a causal relationship between self-efficacy beliefs that the writers hold and the accomplishments that they can achieve in their writing. Accordingly, scholars emphasized that writing self-efficacy beliefs are instrumental for making predictions of crafting outcomes.

Studies show that self-efficacy and writing apprehension are directly related to writing performance and can significantly impact a writer's ability to perform well and produce quality work. Additionally, studies have found that writers' level of apprehension can affect their perception of themselves. For example, in their 1996 study, Patricia Wachholz and Carol Plata Etheridge examined the differences in writing self-efficacy beliefs between low- and high-apprehensive writers. The study involved 43 writing students enrolled in three freshman composition classes. They gathered data over a 10-week period and the study was to be carried out in phases. The first of three phases and the first data to be obtained was the measurement of students' level of writing apprehension. They administered the Daly-Miller Writing Apprehension Test to all 43 students. Those whose scores were one standard deviation above or below the mean were categorized as high- or low-apprehensive writers, respectively. During the second phase, students were asked to describe, in their own words, what the characteristics of a "good writer" were. In addition to this, Wacholz and Ethridge composed a writing profile describing themselves as writers, how confident they were in their writing abilities and what and how their past experiences, whether in school or out, contributed to their attitudes and overall feelings towards writing. And the third and final phase of this study were a series of 30 minute long interviews with five low- and high-apprehension students. They found that both low and high-apprehensive writers had a tendency to bring up their past experiences but while low-apprehensive writers often reported having positive writing experiences, high-apprehensive writers had negative experiences and talked about the many times they have failed or fell short of success. It was evident that low-apprehensive writers had a better relationship with writing, falling deeply in love with the craft, whereas high-apprehensive writers had little to no interest in writing. To high-apprehensive writers, writing ability was purely talent, a gift you were born with. In contrast, low-apprehensive writers viewed it as a skill to be mastered, one that would take time and effort.

Studies on introductory composition courses show that students often struggle with writing not because they lack skills, but because they lack the confidence and doubt their writing abilities. Self-referent thought is a powerful mediator that links one's knowledge and actions. Therefore, even when individuals have the required skills and knowledge, their self-referent may continue in hindering their optimal performance. A 1997 study looked at how self-efficacy could influence the writing ability of 5th graders in the United States. Researchers found that there was a direct correlation between students' self-efficacy and their own writing apprehension, essay performance, and perceived usefulness of writing. As the researchers suggest, this study is important because it showed how important it is for teachers to teach skills and also to build confidence in their students. A more recent study was done that seemed to replicate the findings of the previous study quite nicely. This study found that students' beliefs about their own writing did have an impact on their self-efficacy, apprehension, and performance. This is also evident in a different study on collegiate students that reported the change of knowledge seeking as an outcome of their self-efficacy promotion. Thus, students' self-efficacy is predictive of students' production of effective writing. Therefore, increasing their writing positive beliefs resulted in better performance in their writing. Nurturing the participants' perceived self-efficacy elevated the goals that they used to set up in the writing courses, and this, in turn, promoted their quality of writing and placed more sense of self-satisfaction. Self-regulatory writing is another key determinant associated with writing efficacy and has great influence on writing development. Self-regulation encapsulates the writing dynamism of complexities, time structure, strategies, and whether deficiencies or capabilities. Through self-regulatory efficacy, writers strive toward more self-efficaciousness that effectively impacts their writing attainments

With directed self-placement, the process allows students to choose their entry-level writing course based on self-assessment and reflection. Rather than relying on standardized tests, directed self-placement encourages students to reflect on their past writing experiences and assess their own strengths, weaknesses, and readiness for college-level writing. This process allows students to create their own learning path, make their own academic decisions, and take control of their own educational experience. And by validating their voice and judgment, directed self-placement can boost their self-efficacy.

Writing ability is influenced by psychological factors and technical skills. Higher levels of writing anxiety are associated with less favorable attitudes toward writing and lower confidence in one's writing abilities. Positive attitdudes toward writing are linked to greater writing self-efficacy. Attitudes may also serve as intermediary factors through which anxiety affects confidence, indicating that emotional experiences can play a major role in shaping individual's engagement with and perceptions of writing.

Writing performance is not only obtained as an academic skill but also from psychological factors such as motivations anxiety, self-confidence, and self regulation. Individuals with different motivational orientations may experience writing tasks differently affecting both their emotional response and their sense of how to improve their work. Confidence in one's ability can help reduce the negative effect of anxiety and help people revise their strategies. Learning outcomes are shaped by a mix of cognitive, motivational, and emotional factors rather than instructional practices.

==== Motivation ====
One of the factors most commonly associated with self-efficacy in writing studies is motivation. Motivation is often divided into two categories: extrinsic and intrinsic. McLeod suggests that intrinsic motivators tend to be more effective than extrinsic motivators because students then perceive the given task as inherently valuable. Additionally, McCarthy, Meier, and Rinderer explain that writers who are intrinsically motivated tend to be more self-directed, take active control of their writing, and see themselves as more capable of setting and accomplishing goals. Furthermore, writing studies research indicates that self-efficacy influences student choices, effort, persistence, perseverance, thought patterns, and emotional reactions when completing a writing assignment. Students with a high self-efficacy are more likely to attempt and persist in unfamiliar writing tasks. This persistence is evident in Hamilton and Kalyuk's study focusing on the eight "Habits of Mind"—curiosity, openness, engagement, creativity, persistence, responsibility, flexibility, and metacognition. They found that the first-year college students they examined showed high self-efficacy in areas such as responsibility, openness, and persistence, but showed lower self-efficacy in areas like creativity and flexibility.

In contrast, people with a low sense of self-efficacy view difficult tasks as personal threats and are more likely to avoid these tasks as these individuals lack the confidence in their own skills and abilities. Difficult tasks lead them to look at the skills they lack rather than the ones they have, and they are therefore not motivated to set, pursue, and achieve their goals as they believe that they will fall short of success. It is easy for them to give up and to lose faith in their own abilities after a failure, resulting in a longer recovery process from these setbacks and delays. Low self-efficacy can be linked to higher levels of stress and depression.

Although motivation can influence behavior, self-efficacy operates as a distinct construct, and high motivation does not necessarily imply a strong belief in one's ability to succeed. As a result, confidence and motivation may develop independently and require separate forms of support.

Self-efficacy and anxiety are the pair that impacts learning. High self-efficacy is associated with greater effort, strong engagement, and better performance. while anxiety can undermine one's achievement by lowering confidence in one's ability to succeed. Education environment that improves one's confidence and reduces one's anxiety can Improve learning outcomes.

==== Performance outcomes ====
Self-efficacy has often been linked to students' writing performance outcomes. More so than any other element within the cognitive-affective domain, self-efficacy beliefs have proven to be predictive of performance outcomes in writing. In order to assess the relationship between self-efficacy and writing capabilities, several studies have constructed scales to measure students' self-efficacy beliefs. The results of these scales are then compared to student writing samples. The studies included other variables, such as writing anxiety, grade goals, depth of processing, and expected outcomes. However, self-efficacy was the only variable that was a statistically significant predictor of writing performance.

According to a study conducted, there was a relationship between self-efficacy and academic burnout. Self-efficacy is significantly related to academic burnout and the two variables are negatively correlated. The importance of the role of students' self-efficacy can increase their ability to master lecture material and to be able to control themselves from stressful situations. During the active phase of pandemic, the students needed high self-efficacy to be able to face the pressure and be able to adapt quickly to new elements, like online learning.

Social support

There is also a relationship between social support and academic burnout in the current study. Social support is one of the factors that the students must have because it can help make it easier to adjust to their environment so they may not feel alone in facing problems or obstacles. Individuals receive support from other people in their lives and feel that others care, respect and love them. Social support can help one to survive and overcome pressures. The social support received by students affect the students in forming perceptions of everything they are going through.

=== Public speaking ===
A strong negative relationship has been suggested between levels of speech anxiety and self-efficacy.

Students with higher self-confidence and belief in their abilities have a lower anxiety level. Anxiety spikes for students in relation to gender, academic performance, extracurricular activities, volunteering, and family income. For instance, female students and students who perform low academically reported having a high PSA (public speaking anxiety), meaning no confidence in themselves and increased anxiety levels.

=== Healthcare ===
As the focus of healthcare continues to transition from the medical model to health promotion and preventive healthcare, the role of self-efficacy as a potent influence on health behavior and self-care has come under review. According to Luszczynska and Schwarzer, self-efficacy plays a role in influencing the adoption, initiation, and maintenance of healthy behaviors, as well as curbing unhealthy practices.

Healthcare providers can integrate self-efficacy interventions into patient education. One method is to provide examples of other people acting on a health promotion behavior and then work with the patient to encourage their belief in their own ability to change. Furthermore, when nurses followed-up by telephone after hospital discharge, individuals with chronic obstructive pulmonary disease (COPD) were found to have increased self-efficacy in managing breathing difficulties. In this study, the nurses helped reinforce education and reassured patients regarding their self-care management techniques while in their home environment.

=== Other contexts ===
At the National Kaohsiung First University of Science and Technology in Taiwan, researchers investigated the correlations between general Internet self-efficacy (GISE), Web-specific self-efficacy (WSE), and e-service usage. Researchers concluded that GISE directly affects the WSE of a consumer, which in turn shows a strong correlation with e-service usage. These findings are significant for future consumer targeting and marketing.

Furthermore, self-efficacy has been included as one of the four factors of core self-evaluation, one's fundamental appraisal of oneself, along with locus of control, neuroticism, and self-esteem. Core self-evaluation has shown to predict job satisfaction and job performance.

Researchers have also examined self-efficacy in the context of the work–life interface. Chan et al. (2016) developed and validated a measure "self-efficacy to regulate work and life" and defined it as "the belief one has in one's own ability to achieve a balance between work and non-work responsibilities, and to persist and cope with challenges posed by work and non-work demands" (p. 1758). Specifically, Chan et al. (2016) found that "self-efficacy to regulate work and life" helped to explain the relationship between work–family enrichment, work–life balance, and job satisfaction and family satisfaction. Chan et al. (2017) also found that "self-efficacy to regulate work and life" assists individuals to achieve work–life balance and work engagement despite the presence of family and work demands.

== Subclassifications ==
While self-efficacy is sometimes measured as a whole, as with the General Self-Efficacy Scale, it is also measured in particular functional situations.

=== Social self-efficacy ===
Social self-efficacy has been variably defined and measured. According to Smith and Betz, social self-efficacy is "an individual's confidence in her/his ability to engage in the social interactional tasks necessary to initiate and maintain interpersonal relationships." They measured social self-efficacy using an instrument of their own devise called the Scale of Perceived Social Self-Efficacy, which measured six domains: (1) making friends, (2) pursuing romantic relationships, (3) social assertiveness, (4) performance in public situations, (5) groups or parties, and (6) giving or receiving help. More recently, it has been suggested that social self-efficacy can also be operationalised in terms of cognitive (confidence in knowing what to do in social situations) and behavioral (confidence in performing in social situations) social self-efficacy.

Matsushima and Shiomi measured self-efficacy by focusing on self-confidence about social skill in personal relationship, trust in friends, and trust by friends.

Researchers suggest that social self-efficacy is strongly correlated with shyness and social anxiety.

=== Academic self-efficacy ===
Academic self-efficacy refers to the belief that one can successfully engage in and complete course-specific academic tasks, such as accomplishing course aims, satisfactorily completing assignments, achieving a passing grade, and meeting the requirements to continue to pursue one's major course of study. Various empirical inquiries have been aimed at measuring academic self-efficacy.

Positive academic emotions, such as pride, enthusiasm, and enjoyment, are likely to be influenced by the level of self-efficacy an individual holds. This is because self-efficacy has been linked to an individual's belief in their ability to successfully complete tasks. Therefore, as an individual's self-efficacy increases, they may be more likely to experience positive academic emotions.

Learning outcomes are shaped by both cognitive abilities and personal dispositions, including motivation, self confidence, self regulation, and approaches to problem solving. These factors influence how individuals engage with challenges, apply knowledge, and persist in the learning process, and they can be developed over time through experience and reflection.

=== Eating self-efficacy ===
Eating self-efficacy refers to an individual's perceived belief that they can resist the impulse to eat.

=== Other ===
Other areas of self-efficacy that have been identified for study include teacher self-efficacy and technological self-efficacy.

== Clarifications and distinctions ==
Self-efficacy versus Efficacy
Unlike efficacy, which is the power to produce an effect—in essence, competence—the term self-efficacy is used, by convention, to refer to the belief (accurate or not) that one has the power to produce that effect by completing a given task or activity related to that competency. Self-efficacy is the belief in one's efficacy.
Self-efficacy versus Self-esteem
Self-efficacy is the perception of one's own ability to reach a goal; self-esteem is the sense of self-worth. For example, a person who is a terrible rock climber would probably have poor self-efficacy with regard to rock climbing, but this will not affect self-esteem if the person does not rely on rock climbing to determine self-worth. On the other hand, one might have enormous confidence with regard to rock climbing, yet set such a high standard, and base enough of self-worth on rock-climbing skill, that self-esteem is low. Someone who has high self-efficacy in general but is poor at rock climbing might have misplaced confidence, or believe that improvement is possible.
Self-efficacy versus Confidence
Canadian-American psychologist Albert Bandura describes the difference between self-efficacy and confidence as such:

the construct of self-efficacy differs from the colloquial term 'confidence.' Confidence is a nonspecific term that refers to strength of belief but does not necessarily specify what the certainty is about. I can be supremely confident that I will fail at an endeavor. Perceived self-efficacy refers to belief in one's agentive capabilities, that one can produce given levels of attainment. A self-efficacy belief, therefore, includes both an affirmation of a capability level and the strength of that belief.

Self-efficacy versus Self-concept
Self-efficacy comprises beliefs of personal capability to perform specific actions. Self-concept is measured more generally and includes the evaluation of such competence and the feelings of self-worth associated with the behaviors in question. In an academic situation, a student's confidence in their ability to write an essay is self-efficacy. Self-concept, on the other hand, could be how a student's level of intelligence affects their beliefs regarding their worth as a person.
Self-efficacy as part of core self-evaluations
Timothy A. Judge et al. (2002) has argued that the concepts of locus of control, neuroticism, generalized self-efficacy (which differs from Bandura's theory of self-efficacy) and self-esteem are so strongly correlated and exhibit such a high degree of theoretical overlap that they are actually aspects of the same higher order construct, which he calls core self-evaluations.
Self-efficacy versus self-efficacy bias
While self-efficacy refers to one's beliefs about one's abilities, self-efficacy bias relates one's beliefs about one's abilities to one's actual abilities. For example, someone with low abilities but high self-efficacy would have a positive self-efficacy bias, someone with high abilities but low self-efficacy would have a negative self-efficacy bias, and someone with abilities and self-efficacy on the same level would have calibrated self-efficacy beliefs. Calibrates self-efficacy beliefs are essential for self-regulation.

== See also ==
- Educational psychology
- Hope
- Illusory superiority
- Information seeking
- Outline of self
- People skills
- Positive psychology
- Self
- Serenity Prayer#Precursors
- Work self-efficacy
- Dunning-Kruger effect
- Agency_(psychology)
