= LLI =

LLI or Lli may refer to:

- Lli (trigraph) : A trigraph used in French.
- Londonderry Light Infantry, an Irish Militia regiment raised in County Londonderry
- Low latent inhibition (LLI), a medical condition related to Latent inhibition which is concerned with the different observations that a stimulus adapts to.
- Levelled Literacy Interventions, teaching resources published by Heinemann, sequenced according to the Fountas and Pinnell reading levels
- Lucena Lines, Inc., a subsidiary of Jac Liner, Inc. and a bus company in the Philippines.
- Universal Wrestling Association, also known as Lucha Libre Internacional
- Unequal leg length or leg length inequality
