= Fountas =

Fountas (Greek: Φούντας) is a Greek surname. Notable people with the surname include:

- Giorgos Fountas (1924–2010), Greek actor
- Irene Fountas (born 1948), American educational theorist
- Taxiarchis Fountas (born 1995), Greek footballer
