= Technological self-efficacy =

Technological self-efficacy (TSE) is "the belief in one's ability to successfully perform a technologically sophisticated new task". TSE does not highlight specific technological tasks; instead it is purposely vague. This is a specific application of the broader and more general construct of self-efficacy, which is defined as the belief in one's ability to engage in specific actions that result in desired outcomes. Self efficacy does not focus on the skills one has, but rather the judgments of what one can do with his or her skills. Traditionally, a distinguishing feature of self efficacy is its domain-specificity. In other words, judgments are limited to certain types of performances as compared to an overall evaluation of his or her potential. Typically, these constructs refer to specific types of technology; for example, computer self-efficacy, or internet self-efficacy and information technology self-efficacy. In order to organize this literature, technology specific self-efficacies (e.g., computer and internet) that technology specific self-efficacies can be considered sub-dimensions under the larger construct of technological self-efficacy.

== Origins ==
This construct was intended to describe general feelings toward the ability to adopt new technology and is therefore generalizable across a number of specific technologies. Furthermore, this construct can account for and be applied to technologies that have yet to be invented. Although these features have allowed TSE to remain relevant through the times, this definitional breadth has also created confusion and a proliferation of related constructs.

== Importance ==
21st-century society is completely embedded within a technological context, which makes the understanding and evaluation of technological self efficacy critical. Indeed, nearly half of Americans own smartphones and this trend towards technology use is not limited to the United States; instead cell phone, computer, and internet use is becoming increasingly common around the world. Technology is particularly prevalent in the workplace and learning environments. At work, 62% of employed Americans use the internet and email, but workplace internet users either use the internet everyday (60%) or not at all (28%). Internet and email use is obviously influenced by work duties, but 96% of employed Americans use some sort of new communication technology on the job. Successful investment in technology is associated with enhanced productivity; however, full realization of technological potential commonly plagues organizations. In learning environments, college courses are more frequently being offered online. This is commonly referred to as distance education and implementation ranges from courses being supported by the web (teaching occurs predominantly through face-to-face instructor interactions with supplemental materials being offered on the web) to blended learning (significantly less face-to-face instructor interactions and more online instruction) to fully online (all instruction is conducted virtually with no face-to-face instructor interactions). A number of advantages are associated with distance learning such as increased flexibility and convenience, which allows individuals the opportunity to enroll in classes that would otherwise be off-limits due to geographical or personal reasons. Another commonly cited advantage is that instruction is self paced, which allows for personalized tailoring based on individual needs. However, these advantages are not likely to be realized if the individual is anxious about the method of instructional delivery and/or his or her expectation of success is low due to its technological component. Taken together, these two critical arenas discussed above (workplace and learning) reinforce the extent to which technology has impacted modern activities and consequently the importance of perceived beliefs in one's ability to master new technology. Success in everyday life often hinges on the utilization of technology and by definition, new technology will always be new. Therefore, this construct warrants review.

Furthermore, studies have shown that technological self-efficacy is a crucial factor for teaching computer programming to school students, as students with higher levels of technological self-efficacy achieve higher learning outcomes. In this case, the effect of technical self-efficacy is even stronger than the effect of gender.

=== Differentiation from other forms of self-efficacy ===
Since TSE stems from the same theory as general self-efficacy and other task-specific self-efficacy, the differentiation of this construct from these other forms of self-efficacy is crucial. Unfortunately, previous studies focusing in on TSE have not shown the uniqueness of TSE measures. Despite the dearth of differentiating research on TSE, the uniqueness of this construct can be shown by considering closely related and technology specific self-efficacies (i.e. computer self-efficacy), which has been established as a unique construct. When compared to general self-efficacy, computer self-efficacy has been shown to be unique based on two measures of general self-efficacy. In this same study, the authors showed computer self-efficacy was not related to many types of specific self-efficacy including art, persuasion, and science self-efficacy. One of the most related types of specific self-efficacy was mechanical. This makes sense given both types of specific self-efficacies are related to using tools albeit one being technology the other being more physical in nature. Computer self-efficacy has a domain has also been shown to be related, but distinct, to self-efficacy about computer programs.

== Measurement ==
Following the definition set forth by Bandura, self-efficacy is an individual's belief and confidence in him or herself. This property has important implications for the measurement of any type of self-efficacy. Specifically, measures of self-efficacy must be self-report because the only person who can accurately portray beliefs in one's ability is the target of investigation. In other words, self-report measures of self-efficacy have definitional truth. While a number of problems exist with self-report inventories, in the case of self-efficacy (and other constructs that are defined as internal beliefs and cognitions) this measurement approach is unavoidable.

While the type of measurement approach is defined by the construct, the process of developing and validating these scales has varied considerably throughout the TSE literature. One major difference between measures concerns the scoring of the items. Previously, research has noted differences in results can be partially attributed to different scoring approaches. Specifically, there are two main ways of scoring self-efficacy items. The first type is called self-efficacy magnitude. Items are worded so participants would respond whether or not they felt they could accomplish a certain task (yes or no). The second type is self-efficacy strength. This scoring approach asks participants to rate how confident they are in completing the task(s) on a numerical scale and then averages across all items. All other scoring types are simply composites of these first two approaches.

Another difference between TSE measures concerns the issue of generality. This consideration is similar to the previous differentiation between-TSE as a broader concept and technology specific self-efficacy. Measurement attempts of the broader concept of technological self-efficacy will be considered first. McDonald and Siegall developed a five-item likert scale of technological self-efficacy based on the consideration of previous theoretical studies. This scale was scored using the strength approach to self-efficacy scales. Items in this scale were not referring to specific technologies, but instead focused on technology as a general concept. Using a development process, Holcomb, King and Brown, also proposed a scale to measure TSE Factor analysis revealed three distinct factors containing 19 likert-type items, which also was scored according to the strength scoring system. In contrast to the McDonald and Siegall scale, the items in this scale referenced certain technologies (specifically computers and software packages). The two studies mentioned above represent of attempts to measure TSE as a broader concept.

In addition to the attempts to measure TSE more broadly, a number of studies have developed measures of technology specific self-efficacy. One of the most cited measures of computer self-efficacy comes from Compeau and Higgins. These authors reviewed previous attempts to measure computer self-efficacy and theoretically derived a 10-item scale. Unlike previously mentioned scales, this study employed a "composite" scoring approach. For each item, participants were first asked whether they could complete a specific task related to computers using a dichotomous yes/no scale. Following this answer, participants were then asked to rate their confidence about completing the task from 1 (not at all confident) to 10 (totally confident). The final score was calculated by counting the number of "yes" answers (reflecting self-efficacy magnitude) and the average of the confidence ratings (representing self-efficacy strength). The authors then validated this measure in a nomological network of related constructs. A second example of technology specific self-efficacy is internet self-efficacy. Similar to previous measurement approaches, internet self-efficacy was developed using a theoretical approach that considered previous measures of related topics and developed novel items to address the missing construct space. This scale showed a high level of reliability and validity.

== Antecedents ==
Bandura proposes four primary sources for self efficacy beliefs; (1) prior experience, (2) modeling, (3) social persuasions, and (4) physiological factors. Research supports that many of these sources for TSE are the same; however, there are additional antecedents as well. Although more complex theoretical development and empirical examination addressing how these antecedents operate and relate to one another has not been addressed, the most immediate predictors of TSE are more likely to be Bandura's primary sources (proximal predictors). The remaining antecedents that have also been associated with TSE (e.g., adequate resources, gender, and age) are likely to be more distal predictors. In other words, these distal variables influence more proximal variables (e.g., prior experience, modeling, and social persuasions), which then result in high or low TSE.

=== Prior experience ===
Prior experience with technology is repeatedly found to be influential on technology related self efficacy beliefs. If an individual has had the opportunity to interact with new technologies and, more importantly, has had success with mastering new technologies then individuals are more likely to hold more positive beliefs for future performance.

=== Modeling or participation in technological training ===
Modeling or participation in technological training are also found to be significant predictors of technological self efficacy. Although different types of training interventions have been associated with different gains; in general, research supports that seeing other individuals successfully perform the task at hand (for example, the instructor) and then providing the learner with some opportunity for reinforcement and demonstration (for example, trying to successfully utilize the technology without aid) increases technology related self efficacy beliefs.

=== Social persuasions ===
Social persuasions such as encouragement by others and organizational support are also important contributors to technology related self efficacy beliefs. The actions and statements of others can significantly alter perceptions of their likelihood for success. Organizational support typically includes management's encouragement and assistance. If management does not appear to enthusiastically support employees' attempts to utilize technology then employees are unlikely to accept technology.

=== Resources ===
Resources are commonly cited as one of the largest barriers to adoption of technology. This includes, but is not limited to, sufficient computers, sufficient software licenses, out-of-date hardware/software, and slow or intermittent Internet connections. The success of proper technology use is first and foremost limited by the capabilities of the technology in question.

=== Gender ===
Gender is significantly related, such that men tend to have higher levels of technology related self efficacy beliefs than women. It is still unknown why these gender differences exist.

=== Age ===
Age is also significantly related, such that younger individuals tend to have higher levels of technology related self efficacy beliefs than older individuals. This finding is not surprising given the widespread stereotype of older adults' inability to learn new material, especially when the material is technology related. However, older adults' low technological self efficacy beliefs suggest that older adults may internalize the 'old dogs can't learn new tricks' stereotype, which consequently affects expectations about future performance in technology related domains.

== Consequences ==
Technology related self efficacy beliefs have been linked with a number of consequences. Although, TSE does predict the outcomes reviewed below, please note that some of the antecedents to TSE are better predictors of these outcomes than TSE itself. For example, prior experience is typically a better predictor of task performance than TSE. A recent meta-analysis about self-efficacy (more generally) supports this conclusion as well. Taken together, TSE is important but its importance should not be overstated. Furthermore, it is possible that the effect of TSE on outcomes (e.g., performance) operates through other variables (e.g., behavioral intentions or anxiety).

=== Task performance ===
Task performance is negatively affected, such that lower technology related self efficacy beliefs are related to poorer performance This is extremely important, because these findings suggest that positive perceptions of individuals' technological capabilities may need to be present before successful performance can be achieved.

=== Perceived ease of use and usage ===
Perceived ease of use and usage is found to be positively related with technology related self efficacy beliefs. According to the Technology Acceptance Model, perceived ease of use and perceived usefulness influences behavioral intentions and ultimately technology related behaviors. Other scholars have behavioral intentions to act as a mediator between TSE and other outcome variables (performance). These predictions are similar to those of the well supported Theory of Planned Behavior.

=== Anxiety ===
Anxiety is negatively related, such that lower technology related self-efficacy beliefs are associated with higher level of anxiety.

== Technological Self-Efficacy in the Context of AI and Robotics ==
TSE originated as a intentionally vague construct to account for one's belief in their ability to perform a technologically sophisticated new task. Artificial Intelligence (AI) and Robotics are different from other technologies because they include features like autonomy, adaptive learning, and social capabilities, shifting the dynamic away from traditional computer human interfaces. These features calls for researchers to investigate TSE when a user's interacts with a system that can independently make decisions.

=== Adoption and Acceptance ===
TSE is recognized as a psychological determinant of a users choice to interact with and/or accept new intelligent systems. Research regarding Human-Robot Interaction (HRI) finds that someone with a higher TSE score shows a significant positive prediction of their intent to adopt or work with social robots.

The same relationship is present within TSE and AI. A users self-efficacy influences their attitude toward AI technologies. This dynamic is mediated by how easy the user finds the technology and its associated benefits.. As a user accumulates positive interactions with a robot or AI their confidence increases, as these interactions increase their perceived self efficacy leads to more willingness to utilize the technology.

=== Performance and Learning Outcomes ===
Aside from predicting intention, research suggest that TSE also influences performance and learning outcomes across educational and professional settings. Educational settings that utilize hands on engagement with robotics activities have been shown to be an effective approach for developing students TSE.. This hands on approach allows students to build confidence in their technical abilities. The increase in self-efficacy is positively correlated with the development of STEM problem solving skills as well as a overall improvement in students cognitive and intellectual abilities.

Outside of the classroom TSE as it relates to AI affects ones' professional behavior and decision making. Studies regarding employee interaction with AI in the workplace show that an employees self-efficacy rating as it relates to AI usage acts as a partial mediator between AI use and their willingness to take risks in decision making. This suggests that their confidence in their ability to effectively use AI outputs translates to a greater confidence in pursuing potentially high reward, high risk organizational actions.

=== Anxiety, Trust, and Resistance ===
The relationship between TSE and the psychological dynamics of advanced technology is not always linear. Research shows that there is a complex correlation where higher TSE among users is positively correlated with AI anxiety and AI dependence. The explanation for this counter intuitive finding is that users who are more confident in their ability to use AI tend to use them more frequently which increases their reliance, this high engagement also correlates with anxiety regarding some potential negative outcomes like over reliance or replacement. An individuals TSE acts as a moderator that shapes emotional and behavioral responses to AI-driven techno stressors and influencing an employees intention to adopt these types of systems.

== See also ==
- Industrial and organizational psychology
- Organizational psychology
- Self-efficacy
- Social sciences
- Technology
- Training
