= Shared reading =

Shared reading often uses oversized books, approximately the size of the one used in this public performance. A large book, with large-print text, allows many children to see the words on each page and to read along with the teacher.

Shared reading is an instructional approach in which the teacher explicitly models the strategies and skills of proficient readers.

In early childhood classrooms, shared reading typically involves a teacher and a large group of children sitting closely together to read and reread carefully selected enlarged texts. Shared reading can also be done effectively with smaller groups.

With this instructional technique, students have an opportunity to gradually assume more responsibility for the reading as their skill level and confidence increase. Shared reading also provides a safe learning environment for students to practice the reading behaviours of proficient readers with the support of teacher and peers. Shared reading may focus on needs indicated in assessment data and required by grade-level curriculum expectations. The text is always chosen by the teacher and must be visible to the students.

== Description ==
Traditionally, shared reading has used paper-based materials. However, electronic alternatives, such as apps for interactive whiteboards, may be used instead.

By increasing the amount of shared-reading in the home, parents are able to help children with their development of a larger knowledge base for understanding the world.

== Purpose ==
The main purpose of shared reading is to provide children with an enjoyable experience, introduce them to a variety of authors, illustrators and types of texts to entice them to become a reader. The second and equally important purpose is to teach children the reading process and teach systematically and explicitly how to be readers and writers themselves. Through shared reading, children learn to track print and connect print to speech. By increasing the amount of shared reading in the home, parents are able to help children with their development of a larger knowledge base for understanding the world.

== Specification for texts ==
When selecting texts for reading, teachers typically look for a text that is appropriate for the reading level of the students that is also cross-curricular and relevant in its nature. The text should be of an appropriate length for study and be adequately complex. The text should also have an impact.

== Method ==
In primary grades, the teacher reads while the children are encouraged to read along. The more familiar the text, the more the teachers asks of the students in terms of reading, talking and answering questions about the reading. In upper grades, the teacher reads the text aloud after stating a focus, and then re-reads the text, asking questions specific to the focus of choice (and may ask students to join). The focus may include things like: analysis, predictions, drawing inferences, grammar and punctuation, vocabulary development, questioning, literacy elements, critical thinking, phrasing, fluency, intonation, character and plot development.

Shared reading usually begins with a teacher reading from a big book so that everyone can see the text. Stories that have predictable plots are best because students can participate early on in the shared reading experience. During the first reading, students should simply listen to the story. The teacher might use a pointer to demonstrate directionality in text and one-to-one correspondence. As the text is read multiple times, students should begin to participate by chanting, making predictions, providing key words that are important in the story or participating in echo reading. also suggests to tape-record shared book readings and make it available for students to listen to at another time. "This activity provides a familiar and fluent model for reading with good phrasing and intonation for children to emulate".

== Resources ==
- Fountas and Pinnell - Shared Reading Collection
- Learning at the Primary Pond - Shared Reading Bundles K-2
- Reading A-Z - Shared Reading Books
- Reading Rockets - Shared Reading Classroom Strategies

== See also ==
- Compulsory reading
- Guided reading
- Independent reading
- Learning to read
