= School Reading List =

British online website covering children's books

School Reading List is a British online website covering children's books and children's magazines.

Launched in 2011, it includes age group lists for school classes, children's and YA book reviews, 'books of the month', and resources. The School Reading List website says its recommendations are "curated and reviewed by a small group of librarians, English teachers and parents who discuss books that have worked well with groups of children". The company is based in London.

== See also ==
- school reading
