= Compulsory reading =

Required reading assignment in an educational system

Compulsory reading, required reading, or school reading, refers to a work, often of literature, that is a required reading assignment in an educational system. Compulsory reading is often based on an acknowledged canon, like the Western canon.

== Pedagogy ==
There is a debate in educational research around the value of assigning compulsory reading versus voluntary reading.

== By nation ==
In Poland, the list of required reading (Polish: lektura szkolna, [lɛkˈtu.ra ˈʂkɔl.na]) was established in the early 20th century and has continued till today.

== See also ==
- Children's literature
- Guided reading
- Independent reading
- International Board on Books for Young People
- List of children's classic books
- School Reading List
- Shared reading
- Syllabus
- USBBY Outstanding International Books List
- Young adult fiction
