= Sustained silent reading =

Form of school-based recreational reading

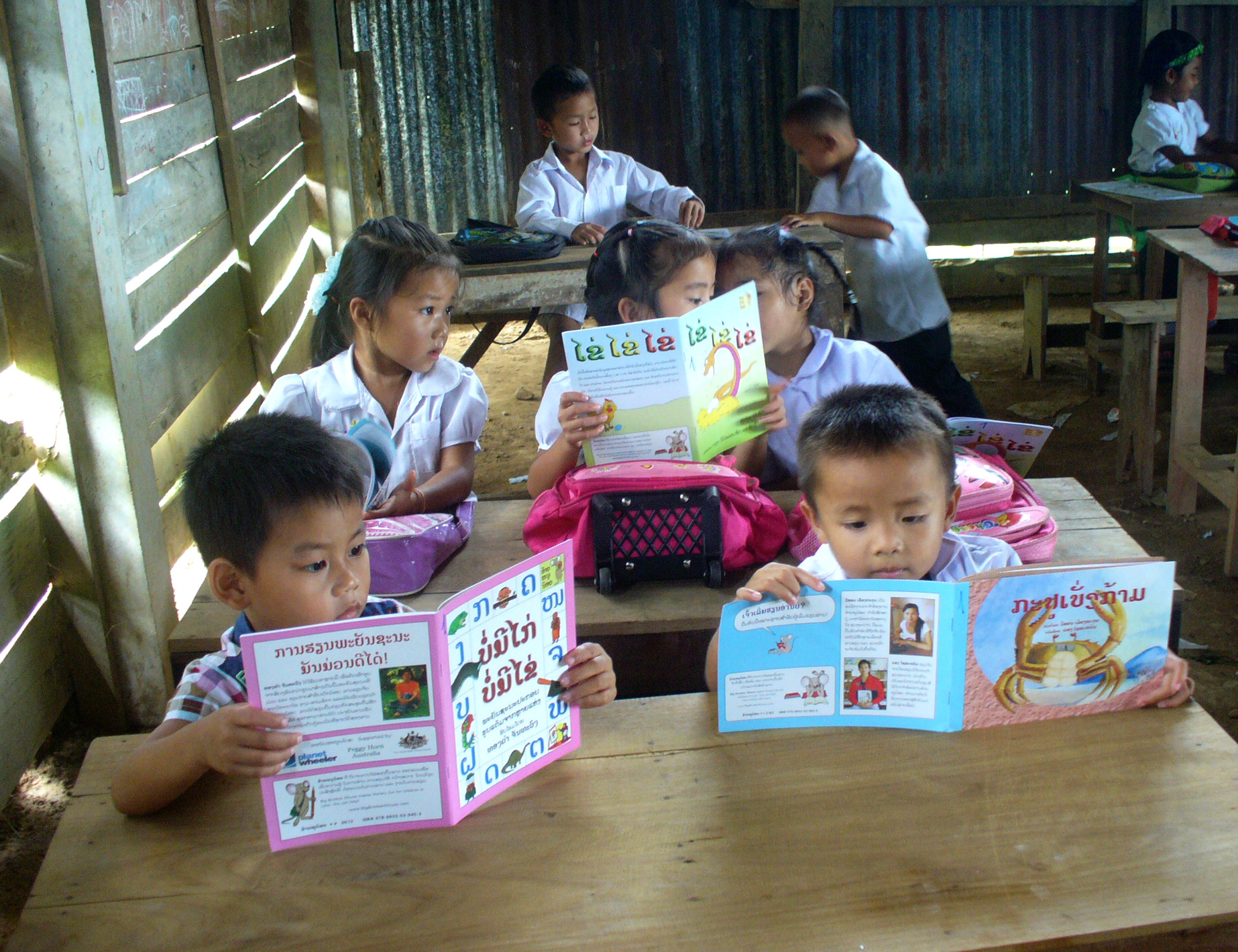
Children in a Lao primary school on their first day of a Sustained Silent Reading program. This village, in the Kasi district of Laos, was the site of the nation's first SSR program.

Sustained silent reading (SSR) or Free voluntary reading (FVR) is a form of school-based recreational reading where students read silently in a designated period every day, with the underlying assumption being that students learn to read by reading constantly. While classroom implementation of SSR is fairly widespread, some critics note that the data showcasing SSR's effectiveness is insufficient and that SSR alone does not craft proficient readers. Despite this, proponents maintain that successful models of SSR typically allow students to select their own books and do not require testing for comprehension or book reports. Schools have implemented SSR under a variety of names, such as "Drop Everything and Read (DEAR)", "Free Uninterrupted Reading (FUR)", or "Uninterrupted sustained silent reading (USSR)".

== Efficacy ==
=== Advocates' perspective ===
According to advocates such as educational researcher Stephen Krashen, SSR leads to gains in several literacy domains. Krashen looked at a large number of studies to see what conclusions were supported by empirical evidence. He found that concerning reading comprehension, SSR is successful; 51 of 54 studies found that students in an SSR program scored as well as, or better than, other students in this regard. It is most successful when used for longer periods.

Furthermore, SSR was shown to create a reading habit. Several years after participating in a program, students reported more reading. One study found that a single SSR session was enough to change attitudes about reading. Long-term effects of SSR include better vocabularies, better writing skills, better spelling, and greater knowledge of literature, science, and "practical knowledge".

Several studies found that children in poor neighborhoods had less access to books at home and in libraries, and often the books available to them were not books that they wanted to read. Prize-winning books were often not especially popular with children. Comic books, on the other hand, are often not available in libraries but are popular with many boys, and reading comics was found to increase the reading of other books. Three additional studies showed that providing rewards for reading did not improve reading development. Krashen believes this is because the presence of a reward suggests that an activity is work, and makes it less appealing. In two other studies, teachers noted fewer discipline problems when an SSR program was being used.

=== Detractors' perspective ===
While many critics believe that SSR is beneficial to students because it gets them in the habit of reading, some argue that SSR alone may not be enough to increase student reading comprehension and fluency rates. One recurring theme in professional critiques of SSR is the prevalence of "fake reading". One study, published in 2010, found after observing one classroom during SSR that roughly 77% of the class was off-task during SSR time. Additionally, there was a 71% correlation between students who viewed reading favorably and students who were reading during SSR and vice versa. These statistics suggest that most students who like reading stay on task during SSR, and most students who do not share their enthusiasm are off-task. There was no evidence to suggest that SSR was helping to create new readers in the classroom.

While some proponents of SSR believe that its detractors are simply against free reading time for students, many critiques of SSR involve supplementing SSR with other reading activities. In 2002, J.C. Marshall posited that SSR, in addition to read-alouds, writing exercises, and increased overall reading time, made for an environment much more conducive to a positive reading atmosphere.

Similarly, Reutzel et al. proposed that scaffolded silent reading (ScSR) and guided repeated oral reading (GROR) are much more effective methods of independent reading. ScSR and GROR share many commonalities with SSR, but additionally feature a more hands-on approach from instructors, who actively play a part in book selection, encourage the reading of diverse texts, monitor student progress, hold book conferences, provide feedback, and hold their students accountable. When implemented in the classroom, students utilizing ScSR and GROR both committed fewer reading errors, demonstrated more expressive reading qualities, and increased their idea unit recall over a year.

In education, SSR has been criticized for not helping children who are not fluent in the language they are reading.

=== National Reading Panel analysis of SSR studies ===
While much of the criticism of SSR has come from independent research, there has also been some exception taken with the National Reading Panel (NRP) and their research into SSR. In 2000, the NRP meta-analyzed all quasi-experimental and experimental studies of SSR and found their effects to be positive. Some have challenged this claim. The panel also noted that the absence of quantitative evidence was not evidenced against the practice in itself. They recommended further study of SSR.

Jim Trelease, educator and author of The Read-Aloud Handbook, is one of many reading advocates who have disputed the impartiality of these findings. He points out that the NRP included only 14 research tests in their summary, out of 54 studies he identified that might have been used. In 10 of the studies used by NRP, SSR students performed the same as other students, and in 4 studies, SSR students did better.

However, some argue the NRP is not biased at all. The NRP only included studies that were verifiable and with scientifically credible designs. The NRP had rigorous guidelines for the studies it would include. For example, the NRP did not include studies without control groups. The fact that the NRP only analyzed 14 SSR studies, shows that the other studies were not scientifically credible.

In the full group of 54 studies, SSR students performed better in 25, worse in 3, and the same in 24. SSR students scored worse only in short-term studies of less than seven months. In studies that lasted one year or longer, SSR students did better in 8 of 10, and there was no difference in the other two. The NRP found that most of the SSR studies were not valid or verifiable. Many studies were simply correlational. Thus, only 14 studies followed guidelines that could make them statistically significant. Of these studies, SSR was found ineffective.

"Where do these negative SSR feelings come from?" Trelease asks. "Perhaps from the wonderful folks who make all those workbooks, textbooks, and score sheets that wouldn't be bought and used in class during the time students were lounging around reading books, magazines, and newspapers and getting so good at reading they might need even fewer of those sheets next year." There is some support for this charge: A blog titled "Why Sustained Silent Reading (SSR) Doesn't Work" is posted by the publisher of four workbooks that sell for $89.99 each.

== Practices ==
A range of practices have been associated with SSR, and some advocates suggest that teacher models of reading behavior (i.e., teachers read while the students read), a long-term commitment to SSR, availability of multiple level, high-interest texts, and a sense of reading community are particularly relevant.

== Free voluntary reading ==
Free voluntary reading (FVR) or recreation reading, related to the comprehension hypothesis, is an educational theory that says many student gains in reading can be encouraged by giving them time to read what they want without too many evaluative measures. Sustained silent reading is a method of implementing recreational and FVR theory.

== Other names ==
Uninterrupted sustained silent reading (USSR) was the predecessor to SSR in many ways. In the 1970s and 1980s, this specific method of reading education was commonplace in many schools around the United States. The prevailing thought process behind USSR was that it would not only create better readers, but also increase students' comfort levels as they navigated indexes, table of content sections, and even entire libraries citation.

There are several notable organizations, acronyms, and celebrations that capture the essence of sustained silent reading. Drop Everything and Read (DEAR) is an acronym meant to encourage young students to read for at least half an hour every day. In the United States, some educators celebrate "DEAR Day" every year on April 12, the birthday of author Beverly Cleary. Some specific institutions such as libraries and schools may even celebrate "DEAR Day" during the entire month of April.

== See also ==
- Extensive reading
- Learning to read
- Phonics
- Reading
