= Independent reading =

Educational term

Independent reading is a term used in educational settings, where students are involved in choosing and reading material (fiction books, non-fiction, magazine, other media) for their independent consumption and enjoyment. Students that read independently have an emphasized creative choice in what they want to read and choose to learn. Usually, independent reading takes place alongside the ongoing curriculum in the classroom or homeschool. Independent reading can be tied to assessment and evaluation or remain as an activity in itself.

== More names for independent reading ==
- SSR: Sustained Silent Reading
- DEAR: Drop Everything And Read
- Voluntary Reading

== Aims of independent reading ==
Students will

- Read more willingly and more often.
- Become more interested in the printed word in general, including their own writing.
- Become more receptive to enrichment activities related to their reading.
- Discover that they can think and write in a meaningful way about their reading.
- Learn that literature can enrich their lives.
- Expand their vocabulary.
- Receive higher test scores.

== How to include independent reading into a routine ==
Teachers can

- Allot time each to independent, where the student will choose a book and read for that amount of time.
- Set a number of pages that students have to read by the end of a specific timeframe.
- Have a book report due where the student chooses and reads a book of their choice and explains it to the class.

Parents can:

- Set a certain amount of time that their child has to read.
- Have their children read them books of their choice.

== See also ==
- Compulsory reading
- Literature circle
- Shared reading
- Guided reading
