= Dialogue journal =

Educational tool involving written interaction

A dialogue journal is an ongoing written interaction between two people to exchange experiences, ideas, knowledge, or reflections. It is used most often in education as a means of sustained written interaction between students and teachers at all education levels. It can be used to promote second language learning (English and other languages) and learning in all areas.

Dialogue journals are used in many schools as a form of communication between teachers and students to improve the life that they share in the classroom by exchanging ideas and shared topics of interest, promoting writing in a non-evaluative context, and promoting student engagement with learning (Samar & Parsaei, 2025). They are also used between teachers and teacher trainers to provide professional development opportunities and improve teaching.

Dialogue journal interaction occurs in various ways; e.g., in notebooks, letters, email exchanges, Internet-based interactions, and audio journals. The important feature is that two people communicate with each other, about topics and issues of interest to both, and the interaction continues over time.

Dialogue journals are a teacher-developed practice, first researched in the 1980s in an ethnographic study of a sixth grade American classroom with native English speakers, supported by a grant to the Center for Applied Linguistics from the National Institute of Education (NIE), Teaching & Learning Division. Applications to other educational settings developed quickly as a way to enhance writing development and the teacher-student relationship across linguistic and cultural barriers, with increasing use in second language instruction, deaf education, and adult literacy education. Since the 1980s, dialogue journal practice has expanded to many countries around the world.

== History of use and research ==
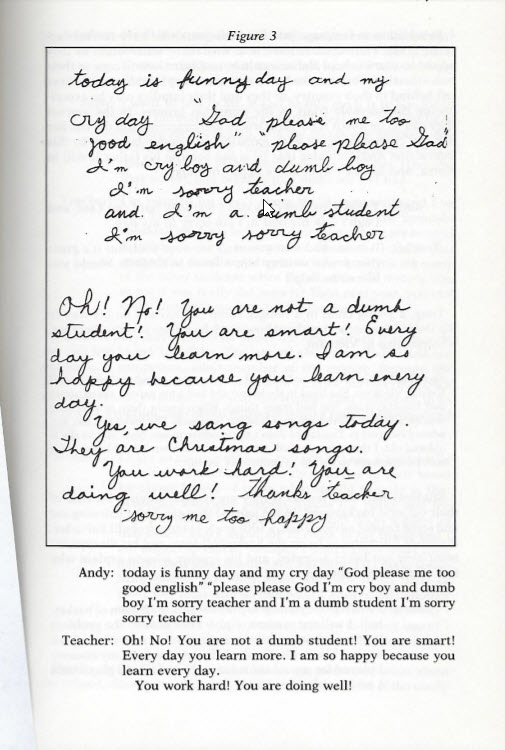
Leslie Reed writing with Andy, a sixth grade student from Korea

The use of dialogue journals as a classroom practice was first documented in the early 1980s, with an in-depth study of its use in a sixth grade classroom in Los Angeles. The teacher, Leslee Reed, wrote daily throughout the school year with each of her students in a dialogue journal (a small notebook) to promote personalized, ongoing, supportive communication.

The first study of Mrs. Reed's classroom of all native English speakers (1979–1980) was followed by a second study (1981–1982) of the same teacher teaching a 6th grade class of students from other countries, all learning English as a second language (ESL), again for an entire year.

The practice spread to deaf education in 1982, with the invitation from William Stokoe at the Gallaudet University Linguistics Research Laboratory to Jana Staton to conduct research and work with teachers at all levels on the Gallaudet University campus.

With the publication of research on the sixth grade ESL students, use of dialogue journals with ESL students and research on the practice and outcomes began growing through the 1980s and 1990s. The practice is now used in educational settings and classrooms at all age levels, from kindergarten through university courses, in adult education programs, and in teacher education programs, to promote open communication, connections among teachers and learners, knowledge sharing, and reading and writing development. The International Research Foundation for English Language Education (TIRF) has a long list of references about dialogue journal writing.

== Key concepts and features ==
Research on dialogue journal use at all age levels—with native speakers of the language of the writing, first and second language learners, deaf students, and teachers—has identified key features of dialogue journal communication that set it apart from most writing in educational settings: authentic communication, collaborative learning and knowledge building, critical thinking, personal voice, critical pedagogy, reciprocal discourse, zone of proximal development, literacy as an interactive process, relationship building, and counseling.

A dialogue journal allows students and a teacher to use authentic communication (including questioning, complaining, complimenting, apologizing, and requesting) to communicate honestly and openly and "get things done". This distinguishes it from most student writing assignments, which are restricted to monologic description, explanation, or narrative. This aspect of everyday language use is known in philosophy as speech acts (John Searle) and in linguistics as pragmatics (J.L. Austin). Dialogue journal conversation, unlike academic writing, opens up opportunities to use almost the full range of these natural functions of language. Tanner and Clement (1997) and Bhushan (2014) give very helpful overviews of these benefits, based on comprehensive literature reviews. They provide a real audience, increase students’ motivation to write, help students focus on meaningful topics, affect the quantity and the quality of their writing, provide conversation practice, allow students freedom to explore and discover, and increase their confidence as writers. Students also develop critical thinking and literacy skills.

Dialogue journals have been found to be successful when students are allowed to write about topics for which they are comfortable. If students are not comfortable discussing a topic, their level of motivation decreases significantly (Trites, 2009). In this study, students were eager to communicate with each other when discussing topics of culture; however, when the topic was on grammatical aspects or research, students would not engage in discussion.

By engaging in interactive and functional interactions in a private context, dialogue journal partners in educational settings are engaged in collaborative learning and collaborative knowledge building about the topic or task they are working on, each other's experiences and backgrounds, and perceptions and thoughts about shared topics. In a classroom setting, the teacher is able to learn about each student's interests, concerns, fears, and experiences within and outside the school.

Dialogue journals have been studied by a number of researchers for their value in developing students' critical thinking by providing opportunities for students to practice self-reflective awareness and to critique classroom practices, teaching assignments, and social contexts, in both first and second language acquisition settings. Practice with critical thinking in exploring their own worlds and the worlds of others, with the words that they have at their disposal, results in students experiencing personal empowerment and expressing a personal voice—the unique expression of the self that seems like hearing that particular person speak in their writing.

Critical pedagogy in dialogue journal writing creates contexts for students to think critically, often in collaboration with the teacher, and develop communicative language abilities as well as critical understanding and awareness of the language and the world. When critical pedagogy is used in language teaching and in interactive writing, learners have the opportunity to use the language in context, use it in writing to consider authentic situations, and think and act as critically conscious beings.

The dialogue journal's reciprocal discourse structure is often cited as the motivation for both teacher and student to continue their engagement with each other over time without external coercion. The reciprocal nature of the discourse provides multiple opportunities to develop an understanding of the other person's world, culture, and experiences, and thus learning occurs for both. The power to question, challenge, and complain becomes equally shared by both writers.

Dialogue journals visibly record how learning occurs in the zone of proximal development, a key concept in the psychology of Lev Vygotsky. According to Vygotsky, learning takes place in the space or "zone" that a child or learner is working in when solving a problem or accomplishing a task. The teacher or more competent peer assists, "scaffolds," the learner's actions or behavior by working collaboratively with the learner. This is different from the learner's actual abilities when working independently on the same task or goal. This concept captures the nature of dialogue journal communication, in which the goal of understanding is achieved by a collaborative effort, with the more competent partner ensuring its accomplishment.

Authentic written communication in a first or second language over time develops learner competence in expressing oneself in the language and understanding the statements of the other person. Thus, in dialogue journals, written literacy learning is an interactive process, which moves from conversation to text. Opportunities to participate in authentic written communication in a new language, in contrast to the restrictions of formal written assignments, is perhaps the major reason that teachers of second languages, particularly of English, have adopted this practice in classrooms around the world. (See the section on Use in international settings.). Schwab (2019) stresses that dialogue journals have effects beyond written performance as a "mutually humanizing" teaching practice, by allowing students to process difficult but important issues with their instructors. This directly affects the instructors’ understanding of their students' lives.

While the descriptions here focus on interactive writing as a way to promote student learning, improved student-teacher relationships can also promote the health and success of students, especially more behaviorally challenged students. In a non-threatening, private context, real issues and personal problems can be discussed and resolved.

== Reading ==
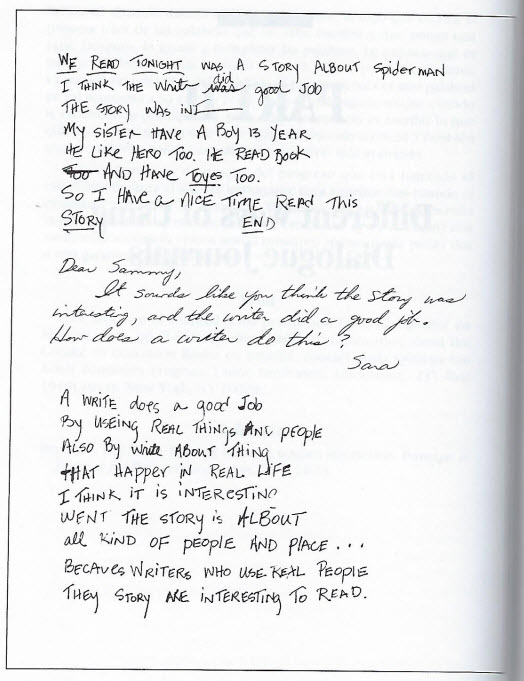
Teacher writing with a student about a story they have read

In dialogue journal interactions, reading and writing are integrated as communicative activities. A few researchers have directly explored the value of dialogue journal writing for developing and assessing reading competence, especially for students acquiring English as a second language and in literature and reading classes with developing readers. One question about the writing is to what extent, and in what ways, it serves as a reading text.

Walworth described the use of dialogue journals to individualize instruction for profoundly deaf college students in advanced college-level reading classes. The written interactions with her students, still struggling with reading and writing in English, provided her with an immediate, ongoing assessment of individual levels of comprehension. Walworth's analysis shows the growth of student comprehension, as student entries began to predict and clarify story plot and character relationships and get at the "deep reasoning" of the characters in the novels. She argues that the teacher/student interactions provide students with opportunities to "try out ideas" and explore the edges of their comprehension, taking the risks that advanced adult reading requires. Walworth's analysis demonstrates how a teacher and a student can work together, first to determine the student's schema or background knowledge and then to make use of it to promote understanding of the meaning of the text.

Studies with hearing students learning English in university courses find similar patterns, with the writing of the teacher providing continuity and coherence to ideas discussed, flow to the writing, and mutual understanding of ideas.

Shuy conducted a case study of a profoundly deaf student's dialogue journal entries in high school to assess the student's growth in reading comprehension over time. He identified five specific features of the student's responses to the teacher's entries that demonstrate comprehension: (1) propositional statements, (2) questions, (3) appropriate inferences, (4) appropriate responses to opinions, and (5) requests for clarification. Shuy argues that dialogue journals can be used as a more accurate assessment of student text comprehension than decontextualized standardized tests of comprehension, particularly for students from a completely different first language context (e.g., American Sign Language).

Several studies by Atwell and others have described the use of dialogue journals as opportunities for students and a teacher to discuss books that students are reading. These studies focus on the role of interactional dialogues in expanding students' awareness of and engagement with books and authors, with the goal of taking readers deeper into written texts. Atwell points out that dialogue journal interactions create the zone of proximal development, in which "mediated learning" can occur, as an expert reader cooperates with a less experienced one to construct meaning from a text. Atwell found that the dialogue journal conversations (1) encouraged students to connect fiction to their own lives; (2) encouraged reflection on themselves as readers, making them conscious of how they learned to read, which included process and rituals; and (3) developed awareness of character, plot, and book structure. Atwell described how the ongoing dialogue changed her written responses from asking "test questions" (questions to which the teacher already knows the answer) to a pattern of offering advice only when asked, and using "nudging" comments to expand students' awareness of meaning and of strategies for understanding written text.

Werderich conducted a grounded theory study of middle school teachers' responses to their students, as they scaffolded students' literacy understandings. Werderich's analysis provides evidence for reading as a dynamic thinking event, in which the teacher's feedback, modeling of interpretative responses, and reflective questions facilitate the development of student comprehension of texts.

Fallon, Wilson, and Wells describe how writing with adult English language learners who are new readers helps the learners to process texts that they encounter in everyday life (newspapers, books, magazines, recipes, school notices, bills, applications, legal documents) and to have the ability and confidence to become engaged with and make interpretations about more academic texts that they read. With second-semester Indonesian students, Aspari (2018) found that when the students produced a written response to a text they had read, they analyzed the text and the issues, themes, and concepts presented in it, from a number of different perspectives. In this process, they developed critical thinking skills, such as analysis, interpretation, inference, and synthesis of knowledge. See Peyton and Staton (2024) for a comprehensive review of the research on the benefits and challenges of dialogue journal writing for developing reading engagement and proficiency and a list of specific approaches that can be used.

In dialogue journal interactions, regardless of whether or not the topic discussed is specified as a reading assignment, reading and writing are integrated as communicative activities.

== Writing development ==
Increasingly, writing is a critical part of learning in all areas of education—English Language Arts and all content areas. The ability to write effectively is a requirement for success at all levels of education, from elementary school through high school and in university and adult education classes. The current focus of the Common Core State Standards and World-Readiness Standards on academic excellence, including writing, has increased the amount and sophistication of writing that students are engaged in and required to do.

Research shows that the act of writing deepens understanding of a topic or area of thought, improves the ability to process and express ideas, and can result in increased critical thinking. However, when ability to perform on specific writing tasks is the primary or only focus in class, student engagement can suffer. Hall and Duffy describe a group of teachers who found that, when they examined the writing of a group of elementary school students and considered what was missing from the children's writing, it was the children themselves who were missing. "The boring sentences sounded as if they had been borrowed from basal readers" (p. 523).

Studies of dialogue journal writing have shown that students, including those who are learning from language of instruction (and the teachers, classroom helpers, or prospective teachers they are writing with) can increase their sense of engagement with each other and their self-confidence with writing, learn to express themselves for an audience, and create an atmosphere of openness and expression when that is the focus of the writing.

At the same time, a question that has been asked and addressed in the literature is, "Do dialogue journals help students to become better at writing and to see themselves as writers?". Since dialogue journal writing has many features of conversation/interaction, does that type of writing improve the types of writing desired and required in school?

The answer to this question, of course, depends on the level of the students, the types of writing they are engaged in and need to carry out, and the nature of the written dialogue. Studies seeking to address this question have identified some positive results.

For example, research on students' writing in dialogue with the teacher and with other students, carried out with elementary school students, high school students, university students, and adults in adult education classes, with students who are writing in their native language or in a language they are learning, has had the following results. Students ...

- Are enthusiastic about writing and engaged with the person or people they are writing with
- Have enhanced motivation to write and increased writing fluency
- Have more confidence in themselves as writers
- Write more over time, often with more complexity of expression, than when they write in other contexts and on other writing assignments
- Show improved fluency with writing and performance on content, organization, coherence, and vocabulary, as they take responsibility for their writing over time
- Engage in reading, which promotes their sense of being literate individuals and informs their writing

Writing with another person also breaks some students' writer's block and anxiety about writing. Finally, writing tasks that serve authentic communicative purposes permit real writing development and give students a sense of the demands of the writing task and of specific components of language use. When the teacher and students use visual aids (drawings and textual enhancements), in addition to words, this can enhance the engagement of both the teacher and the students, augment the interactive process, and promote more dialogue.

See Denne-Bolton (2013) for a thorough, clear explanation of the benefits of dialogue journal writing and the benefits to students of many different ages.

Improvement in students’ writing can be a result of the style and engagement of the teacher's writing, which might focus on “language structure, language for communication or language for empowerment” (Orem 2001, p. 73). But, mechanics are not the goal of dialogue journal writing. Peyton and Seyoum (1989), comparing sixth grade students’ classroom writing assignments and their dialogue journal writing at the end of a school year, found that the teacher's approach was to respond to topics introduced by the students rather than to introduce her own topics, and to contribute to the dialogue by making statements and expressing opinions rather than eliciting student writing with questions. This technique resulted in a collaborative writing effort, with teacher and students mutually developing topics of interest to them. It also resulted in the students writing far more than the minimum required.

In summary, dialogue journals are not designed to automatically improve grammatical accuracy or “performance” on assigned essays that require direct classroom instruction. Instead, dialogue journal writing, over sufficient time, has shown over and over to encourage much more ease in writing extensive discourse, thoughtful reflection and complexity, development of the writer's ‘voice’, and confidence and enjoyment in writing in a first or second language.

== Thinking and learning ==
Current research and educational practice focus on the importance of providing instruction that promotes cognitive development and critical thinking. This is true not only in contexts where thinking and writing are done independently, but also in contexts where both young and adult learners interact and collaborate with more knowledgeable others. Lee describes the research that is guiding this shift, with a focus on developing the ability to engage in argumentative writing:

A growing body of research shifts attention from what an individual student can do in isolation to how to establish a classroom community in which students experience an authentic need to engage in argumentation. Members of such classroom communities work together and make decisions about what counts as argument and what is required to support a new knowledge claim (p. 92). (Emphasis added)

Prain and Hand describe the need for students to be able to "choose and define problems; develop and test multimodal inquiry methods; examine findings; build, critique, and review theories and models; and make a persuasive case for claims" (p. 432) in their writing.

While personal journal writing has a long history in education settings as a way to promote reflective thinking, interactive writing in a dialogue journal, with a teacher, promotes not only personal reflection but also reflection with another person, who is often more knowledgeable about the topics under consideration and provides a scaffold or support for the learner's own thoughts. Research has shown that the act of writing itself deepens understanding of a topic or area of thought, improves the ability to process and express ideas, and fosters higher cognitive functions. Writing with a teacher or professor, in a dialogue journal, provides the opportunity for the learner to consider and incorporate the thoughts and manners of expression of an experienced member of the culture about topics that the learner is thinking and writing about. Dialogue journal writing can be described as a place for risk-free experimentation with written language, as an opportunity for developing critical literacy and a reflective perspective on a topic of focus.

Early research on dialogue journals explored the cognitive processing inherent in interactive written dialogues with a skilled teacher, drawing on Vygotsky's theory of interactional scaffolding of learning. Staton studied the gradual elaboration of topic understanding on the part of a 6th grade students, the acquisition of problem solving strategies over extended periods of time, and the ways that a novice learner and teacher "thinking together" about a topic allowed the student to see and assimilate patterns of thought from an experienced and successful member of the culture (in this case, the teacher). Rana (2018) also examines the use of dialogue journal writing with university students learning English from a Vygotskian perspective and finds similar benefits and positive outcomes.

Recent research on the use of dialogue journals in second language acquisition settings has focused on their value in developing students' critical thinking by providing opportunities for them to practice self-reflective awareness, develop an empowered personal "voice" and critique classroom practices. For example, in a case study of dialogue journal writing over 10 months between a 6-year-old Persian speaker beginning to learn English with his Canadian teacher, Nassaji and Cumming demonstrate the power of creating conditions for a young English learner to develop language proficiency in "a complementary, dynamic, and evolving manner" (p. 113), as the teacher worked within the learner's zone of proximal development (ZPD). In a study of the dialogue journal writing of high school students in Iran over the course of a year, Ghahremani-Ghajar and Mirhosseini found growth in the percentage of entries reflecting critical or creative thinking, instead of descriptive or personal references, which were prominent in the students' early writing. In a series of studies of dialogue journal writing in university classes in Hong Kong, Guizhou, and Beijing, China, Chiesa and Bailey found that the writing was not only a language-learning task but also "a way [for the students] to grow socially, mentally, and emotionally with the support of a teacher" (p. 53). (See further discussion in the sections on Second language learning and Use in international settings.)

These patterns have been described in other academic settings as well. For example, in a study of first-year students in medical school writing in dialogue journals with their professors, Ashbury, Fletcher, and Birtwhistle found that the interactive journal writing "provided a safe place for students to describe their experiences and relationships and to question their own values and beliefs." Similar patterns are described by Lucas (writing in a graduate linguistics course for deaf university students), and Walworth (writing with deaf high school and university students). The process of writing in this way, with their teachers, broke down barriers between them, through mutual sharing of thoughts and feelings. This dynamic led to enhanced rapport and communication, facilitated students' personal and reflective perspectives, and initiated and encouraged self-awareness.

== Second language learning ==
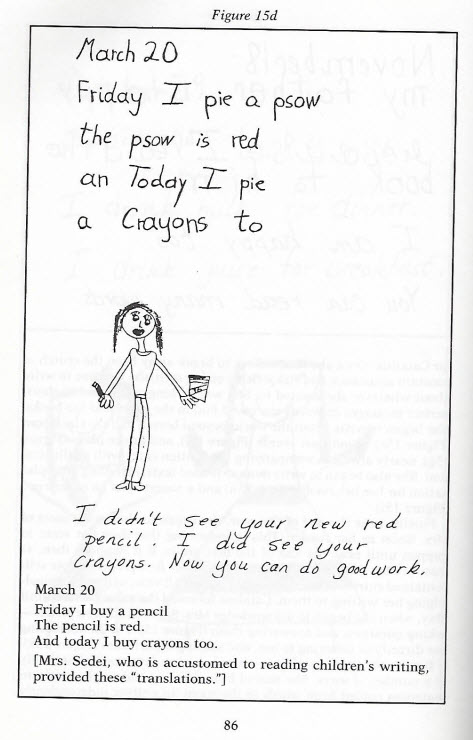
Mrs. Sedei writing with Catalina, a first grade student from Colombia, learning English

Much of the use of and research on interactive writing takes place in the field of second language learning, whether students are learning English or another world language (Chinese, French, Persian, Spanish, etc.) in the United States or another country. (See Casanave for a summary of diverse uses of journal writing in different contexts.) The first published study of the interactive writing processes and written patterns of students learning English as an additional language was of sixth grade students in California writing with their teacher, Leslie Reed. This study of the daily writing of these students and their teacher over the course of a school year demonstrated that young students, new to the United States and to learning English, can begin to write early in the year, and the richness and complexity of their writing develops over time. As Peyton and Staton describe,

As we read the dialogue journals we discovered that these students could write, even though they were still learning English, and some at very beginning stages. They could use writing to communicate meaning, and most were eager to do so. We also found that the journals became an important place for making sense of the world – in many cases a new school, language, and culture. The students could ask questions about everything from Mrs. Reed's age to the structure of an atom, worry over problems with school friends or content, and complain when things didn't go as they thought they should.

As we analyzed the writing done throughout the year, we found that the students who were more advanced and motivated were able to break out of some of the constraints of teacher-directed classroom work and explore the limits of their English proficiency, with the teacher's entries serving as a model and guide. Some of their writing in the journals was more complex than the other writing that they did to complete class assignments. Students at the beginning stages of learning English were reluctant to write at first and wrote very little, sometimes only the date. They moved to using a specific pattern in one or two sentences (e.g., I like ____."), until by the end of the year, they were using English constructions including articles; past, progressive, and future tense; and improved spelling (e.g., a change from bekes to because). The strategies that the teacher used in her writing seemed to have an impact on the students' written expression and writing development.

Since then, studies of dialogue journal writing (discussed below in this section) have found that it is a valuable instructional tool in language learning classes with children and adolescents, university students, and adults in adult education programs. A valuable resource is Casanave, who describes, with examples and suggestions, journal and dialogue journal writing with students writing in a second/new language – young children, high school and college students, and adults – with low proficiency, intermediate proficiency, and advanced proficiency in the language they are learning. This provides an excellent summary of these contexts and guidance for working in them. (See also sections in this article on uses of dialogue journals in international settings, where students are learning to write in additional languages. The sections on deaf education, counseling, and with students with special needs, also include children and adults learning a second or additional language, often English as an additional language.)

The writing can take place between students and the teacher or between language learners and native language speakers. The purposes might be overall language acquisition, development of writing abilities, opportunities to extend learning of the language beyond time in class, promotion of ability to transition to academic writing in university classes, and easing of the trauma of transition to life in the United States.

=== With children and adolescents learning English ===
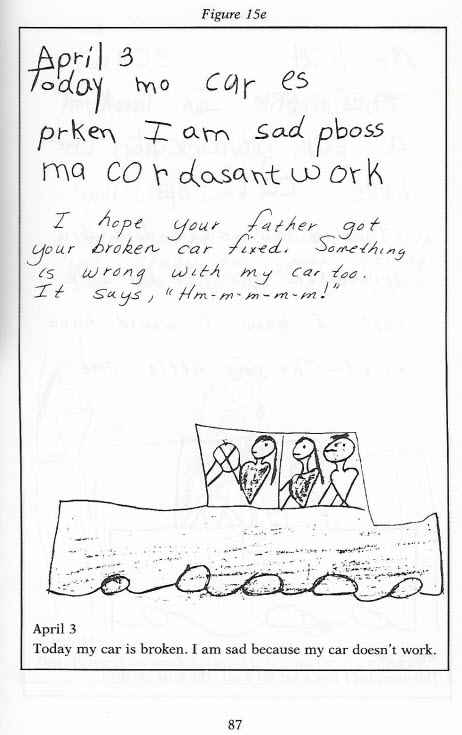
Mrs. Sedei writing with Catalina, a first grade student from Colombia, learning English

Yürekli & Afacan (2020) describe the expectations of students in a university EFL (English as a Foreign Language) setting in terms of writing. They “are generally required to be fluent and accurate writers, capable of generating content, organizing it in accordance with academic conventions, and demonstrating these skills in their second or additional language, English” (pp. 4 & 5). Citing Johns (1995), they argue that “trying to create authors even though they are not ready as second language writers ignores the reality of the situation. Thus, first developing students as confident writers and lessening their apprehension should be the priority. Journal writing, in this respect, offers students the opportunity to practice the skill of writing in a less-threatening writing task and gives them a chance to generate ideas with a real communicative purpose” (p. 6). In their study of undergraduate (freshman) students in a university in Turkey, they found, based on pre- and post-test writing of the dialogue journal group and two other groups that did not engage in dialogue journal writing (one journal writing with no dialogue; one no journal writing), that the dialogue journal group showed the highest gain in post-test scores. They also found, in interviews with the students, that they felt much more confident as writers than the students in the other two groups and that the expressive and communicative nature of the writing affected both the students and the teachers positively.

Rana (2018) describes similar challenges and benefits, considers dialogue journal writing with university students learning English from a Vygotskian perspective, and lists a number of research studies where similar benefits are found.

Benefits are also found in the studies described below.

Nassaji and Cumming studied 10 months of dialogue journal writing between a six-year-old Persian speaker ('Ali') beginning to learn English and his teacher in Canada. They found that in the writing, both writers "acted as proficient users of English – in spite of Ali's emergent spelling, vocabulary, syntax, and penmanship – because the dialogue journal created a 'setting for thought', in which both participants reciprocally shared common knowledge, purposes, and tools of communication, evidently understanding and appreciating them" (p. 114). This process seemed to help Ali write in his second language. While he initially used one language function (reporting – of general facts, personal facts, or opinions), the teacher used a variety of language functions, thus exposing Ali to them (reporting, requesting, evaluating predicting, and giving directives). The authors state, "We assume [the teacher] was striving to scaffold her written interactions to prompt Ali's potential for learning English in this context" (p. 104). Gradually, it seems in response to this scaffolding, Ali began to use the teacher's questioning patterns and reporting styles and to use a variety of other language functions as well.

Lipp (2001) was teaching a Methods of TESL (Teaching of English as a Second Language) course at California State University, Fresno, for students preparing for careers as elementary school teachers. She collaborated with a third grade teacher in an elementary school in Fresno to arrange for the prospective teachers to write in "pen pal journals" with Hmong refugee children in the teacher's third grade class (children 8–9 years old). The pen pals wrote to each other once a week and also spent time together, when the university students visited the school to talk with the students and participate in special events. Four themes emerged during the course of this project: 1) crossing boundaries – elementary school children and university students, and a university professor and elementary school teacher, worked together closely for a year; 2) becoming aware of and sensitive to the broader sociological context – the university students learned to engage with the third grade students about topics the students introduced and to become interested in the lifestyle that the students described, which was very different from their own. They also developed understanding of literacy and second language learning processes; 3) empowering children as writers – The children primarily wrote narratives about their lives and activities, and some of them "used the pen pal journal as a forum to elaborate on their lives and to share stories shaped by their imagination, their gender, and their culture" (p. 121); 4) recognizing interaction as a key component of literacy – The written interaction became a regular part of the children's lives, and many of them moved from answering the university student's questions to introducing their own topics for written discussion. The chapter concludes with helpful tips for setting up and maintaining a pen pal project between children and prospective teachers.

Alexander (2001) studied the dialogue journal writing that she did with grade 6, 7, and 8 students learning English (ages 11–15) in her classes in a suburban U.S. middle school outside Chicago, Illinois. She found a number of benefits of the writing: The journals provided an excellent way for the students to practice grammar, spelling, punctuation, and handwriting in a real, communicative context. They provided a longitudinal record of the students' growth in written English and a way for her, and the students, to notice what they were learning and how their English was developing. They also

provided a personal and private connection to a trustworthy adult. At a time when teenagers report more and more alienation from the mainstream of adult society, dialogue journals are an excellent way to keep up with teens' emotional changes and clarify information for them in a way that does not embarrass them in front of their peers. The dialogue journal provides a safe haven for building trust with an adult, naming and exploring feelings, and resolving issues. (p. 35)

Alexander includes a list of practical ideas for writing with students, including ways to adapt the teacher's writing when writing with students learning English, from low-beginning to high-beginning and intermediate levels.

In international contexts, Liao and Wong studied dialogue journal writing of 41 10th grade students learning English in Taiwan. They found improvement in the students' writing fluency; writing performance on content, organization, and vocabulary; reflective awareness of writing and growth as learners; and motivation to write. The writing also reduced the students' writing anxiety. The researchers reported that the writing was an important tool for self-understanding and self-growth and allowed students to consider something new; enhanced their self-confidence, so that they could get along better with others; matured them through sharing their ideas, feelings, and self-perceptions; consolidated their thinking when re-reading their journals; strengthened their confidence in English writing; and gave them the chance to reflect on their daily lives. Mukti (2016) found similar results with year 12 IPA students in Indonesia – that the students responded very positively to the opportunity to write in dialogue journals and made significant improvements in the content, organization, vocabulary, language use, and mechanics of their writing of narrative texts. Yulia (2011) found similar results with first-year university students learning English in Indonesia.

Jardine wrote in dialogue journals with 28 10- to 11-year-old Xhosa-speaking students in grades 4 and 5 in an English-medium school in the Western Cape of South Africa. Although the goal in the school was for the children to learn English, Jardine wanted to help them see the value of their home language (Xhosa) and use it to express themselves in writing. She wanted to investigate the dialogue journal writing process as a means of raising the status of Xhosa at the school, as well as affirm the voices of children in asymmetrical multilingual settings (where English had much more status than their home language; e.g., she found that the Xhosa speakers in the school were often considered to be "English learners rather than potentially multilingual and resourceful" p. 16). Jardine tried to move from writing English to writing in Xhosa, but most of the writing was in English. Still, she found that because of the relationships that were formed in the writing, the children were able to write in English and take risks with spelling and forms, even though their English was limited. At the same time, as they were encouraged to write in Xhosa, and as she wrote in Xhosa with them, they became more confident about writing in that language as well. "In the journal writing process, I aimed to show the children that the languages they use matter, that their voices matter, and that they matter" (p. 72). After this experience of writing in both languages, Jardine concludes that,

In my view, this counter-discourse of valuing African languages, seldom expressed by parents and teachers, was the most striking language awareness response to the journal writing process. The children had come to the ideological awareness of 'language-as-resource' as envisaged in the South African Constitution. This heightened language awareness illustrates the potential of multilingual dialogue writing to provide children with opportunities to voice themselves in writing and 'claim the right to speak' (p. 70).

(For further discussion of the processes and outcomes of dialogue journal writing in international contexts, see the section on Use in international settings.)

=== With university students ===
Studies of dialogue journal writing with university students have found that they not only provide a way for students to grow socially, mentally, and emotionally with the support of a teacher but also to connect what students are learning inside the language classroom to their experiences beyond the classroom.

Chiesa, Damerow, and Bailey describe six features of pedagogical scaffolding that might be used in dialogue journal writing in university courses—continuity and coherence, supportive environment, intersubjectivity, flow, contingency, and the handover/takeover principle. They analyzed the writing of students' dialogue journal entries and the teachers' responses in two courses and asked: Are the six features of pedagogical scaffolding present in the students' dialogue journal entries and the teachers' responses? They found that continuity and coherence, supportive environment, intersubjectivity, and flow and contingency were evident throughout the writing, and some evidence of the handover/takeover principle appeared as the students' independent ideas emerged over time.

Moulton and Holmes looked at ways that dialogue journal writing can provide a bridge for international students learning English in a college or university course that spans the chasm between cultures. In a study of ESL students in an intermediate composition class at a university over a 15-week semester, they found that the students used the dialogue journal writing to explore cultural issues as they experienced various stages of acculturation. The writing demonstrated that

[The students'] feelings progressed from cultural isolation to a willingness to share cultural perspectives and, finally, to understanding and acceptance of their new culture. In the dialogue journals, the students were free from the constraints that bound their other written work and were able to use their new language expressively for their own purposes. The journals seemed to be important to the students, not for grades or the teacher's approval, but because they alleviated some of their feelings of cultural isolation and helped them make the transition from their own cultures to a new one" (p. 21).

The authors conclude that dialogue journal writing can allow students "to move through the stages of acculturation naturally, enhancing language acquisition in the process" (p. 22).

Dolly, in a study of dialogue writing between adult ESL students in an intensive English program at Indiana University of Pennsylvania's American Language Institute, found that the journals, which took place between adults (students and teacher) provided an opportunity for reciprocity, for the partners to share responsibility for conversation management – introducing and extending topics and handling communication problems. The nonnative English speakers' role in and contributions to the interaction became as important as those of the native English speaker.

Trites (2001) found that using dialogue journals between the teacher and ESL students provided an opportunity for students to develop second language fluency without the fear of grades. Students were allowed to discuss their perceptions of the course readings without fear of embarrassment in the classroom and were allowed to ask questions that others might find silly.

Dialogue journal use as a tool to promote language learning has not been confined to the learning of English. For example, Darhower used them in an intermediate college Spanish class and found that the students used the writing to reflect on their experiences learning Spanish, consolidate information about topics covered in class, and use language functions that have been introduced and covered in class.

=== With adults in adult education programs ===
Dialogue journal writing has been used extensively in adult education classes for students learning English, from beginning to advanced levels of English proficiency and literacy, and the benefits described are rich and complex.

Talburt wrote in dialogue journals for 16 weeks with her students who were refugee women from Russia, in an Advanced Grammar class in an adult ESL program. In her analysis of the writing with one student, "Marina" (a 25-year-old woman from Moscow who had finished a university degree in the sciences when living there), Talburt found that the journal gave Marina a place where she was confident expressing her identity and her thoughts about many issues. This reinforced Marina's sense that she could understand and be understood by Americans and communicate with them beyond superficial levels, which she didn't have when she arrived. At one point Marina wrote,

You asked me about my feelings about the jornal. I like it very much, I enjoy doing that. Now it's part of my life. If it stops, I'll lose something very important for me. ... The last 2 or 3 times I write it at night. I love these few hours when nobody and nothing distract me and I can think in silence. (p. 67)

Larrotta (2008) kept dialogue journals with 17 Spanish-speaking adults in an intermediate ESL literacy class in a community literacy program in Central Texas. The students, who had, in other classes, been trained to write very controlled compositions and sentences, were at first nervous about writing in English. Some of them had rarely written more than two sentences on the same topic, and some had very little experience writing in their native language. She found, over the semester of writing together, that the students enjoyed the writing and considered it to be an effective learning tool; found it easy to introduce topics to write about (rather than relying on her to introduce topics); believed that it was a good way to bridge cultural and personal gaps and discuss cultural differences; and progressed in their writing, from simple sentences or lists of words to communicating ideas in extended texts. She concludes, "It was rewarding for me to see the students' faces and observe their body language responses when I gave the journals back to them. ... I could see them reading my entries and making faces, laughing, looking for words in the dictionary, or asking questions about the message in the journal. This made me think that the dialogue journal was a useful and rewarding pedagogical tool for all of us" (p. 21). The article includes helpful guidelines for teachers using dialogue journal writing with this adult learner population.

Kim had a similar experience to that of Larotta. Writing with adult ESL learners in a community-based adult basic education program in the Southwestern United States, she found that while the adult learners engaged in meaningful dialogue and social interaction in writing, they had the opportunity to both share their own culture and to learn about a new culture. They also developed critical literacy, the opportunity to think critically about the social and cultural contexts of language and learning rather than simply mastering specific skills.

Vanett and Jurich, writing with adult learners in an ESL program, found that when adult learners gain confidence as writers, they become autonomous learners, are motivated to express themselves in writing, and can move into the types of writing expected in academic contexts, about many different topics and in many different genres and styles.

Dialogue journal writing has also been used successfully with adults with extremely limited literacy skills, who, at the beginning, may know the alphabet, be able to write their name, and, with difficulty, write a few sentences in their native language (Spanish) but have no writing ability in English. Spener in an 8-week course with adults at this level, after several rather unsuccessful attempts to interact in writing in ways that engaged the students, found that when he took a specific approach, genuine interaction in writing occurred, students were engaged, and their writing developed. His approach included interacting with the students orally first, so that he and the students knew each other; gradually moving toward independent writing, without initial oral interaction; ensuring that the written dialogue was at the student's levels, so they had the satisfaction of reading and writing successfully; and providing time for the writing to take place, so that the students don't feel rushed.

Adult education teachers work with a diverse group of learners, many of whom have many responsibilities in their lives in addition to coming to English class and may rotate into and out of classes frequently. As a result, the writing can be challenging. For example, Fallon worked with five basic literacy students at a learning center in rural south-central New York. All of the students found it difficult to read. Fallon conducted the dialogue journal writing in a computer lab, so that the students could become familiar with the technology. Written dialogue, on computers, seemed ideal for a number of reasons. However, after a year of engaging in this writing, Fallon found that he was not seeing the writing and reading development that he had hoped to see, and "our dialogue had become stagnant" (p. 139). After reviewing the theoretical discussions of learning and dialogue by Mikhail Bakhtin (1981) and Paulo Freire, Fallon concluded that the notion of authentic dialogue is critical to effective written interaction. This includes shared responsiveness, where both partners engage in asking and answering, the content focuses on generative themes that are of interest and importance to the learners, and the writing is connected with other written texts (including letters or newspaper articles). In summary, effective interaction with adult learners requires specific understanding, focus, and engagement by the teacher.

Orem also points out possible challenges with writing with adult learners who, in this confidential context, may write about problems in the workplace (including harassment and documentation), at home (including domestic violence), and the community (including police profiling). They also may write about health issues and challenges in schools that their children attend. He points out that teachers need to be prepared to respond authentically and in confidence. He concludes by pointing out that this written interaction provides an excellent opportunity to engage in problem posing, which can lead to transformation of a community of learners. (See also Paulo Friere, Pedagogy of the Oppressed, 1970, updated 2007, for discussion of the importance of authentic dialogue.)

== In deaf education ==
Dialogue journals have become an accepted practice at all levels of deaf education since 1982, when the Linguistics Research Laboratory, directed by Dr. William Stokoe, created the Gallaudet Dialogue Journal Research Project and brought Dr. Jana Staton to introduce the practice to teachers and instructors at Kendall Demonstration Elementary School (KDES), Model Secondary School for the Deaf, and Gallaudet University. From this initial project, the use of dialogue journals has become an accepted practice in English literacy education for deaf and hard of hearing students (hereinafter "deaf"). The Laurent Clerc National Deaf Education Center identifies dialogue journals as one of nine "best practices" for a comprehensive communication-based literacy approach for deaf students, including an online course with a DVD, I Like Dialogue Journals But....

In the 1980s, before the Internet and widespread email and texting made interactive, written communication accessible, profoundly deaf students were largely shut out of functional, meaningful, personally directed writing in school settings. Writing instruction was often largely a matter of rote copying from the blackboard. The tested reading and writing levels of many students has, for decades, seemed to plateau at upper elementary school (Gallaudet Research Brief, 2011), even for those entering college. A practice involving functional written conversations with a teacher in the school context was a marked addition to instructional practice.

Staton and colleagues, studied the initial years of dialogue journal use between deaf students and teachers in elementary and secondary school and found three potential outcomes:

1. Initiation of students into functional use of written English through natural dialogue, providing well-formed and sufficient written input for profoundly deaf students, in line with optimal second language acquisition theory.
2. Creation of understanding and rapport between teachers and students, which is especially important when the teacher has normal hearing and may not be proficient in ASL as a second language.
3. Engagement of students in cognitively demanding interactions in written English that reflect their actual cognitive maturity.

Other studies of dialogue journal use with deaf students at older ages, including in college, reviewed below, reflect similar results. These initial studies were observational in nature. No comparison groups without dialogue journal use were available to compare the impact on students' written language development.

=== Functional uses of written language ===
Bailes et al. found that elementary school students who were the least proficient in written English at the beginning of the academic year (mostly children from hearing families without American Sign Language (ASL) as a first language) caught up with more proficient ASL signers by the end of the year. They were able to introduce and elaborate on their own topics rather than just respond to the teacher's topics and used a wider range of language functions, even as they continued to be unwilling to participate in other class reading and writing activities. Bailes et al. analyzed the movement of students in two classes from fall to spring, from drawing and one-word responses to syntactic representation of ideas. They found that 33% of fall entries were drawing, with only 10% having recognizable English syntax. In the spring, 70% of entries had complete syntactic representation of meaning ("I went to see the zoo."), and there were no drawings. All of the students were in an optimal, language-rich print environment at Kendall Demonstration Elementary School, but the dialogue journal use appears to have engaged them in written English use more effectively than did other classroom assignments.

At the time of the first dialogue journal use at Gallaudet University (1982–1984) and at the National Technical Institute for the Deaf (NTID) (1980–1990), many students entered post-secondary education with very rudimentary written language competence in English and often were not proficient in ASL. Studies of their dialogue journals focused on and provide evidence for the growth of communicative competence in English through interactive written conversations. Among the critical aspects of emerging writing competence were organization and coherence in writing at the discourse level, paragraph development, and increased length and comprehensibility of responses. Even in a brief time period (10 weeks), Albertini and Meath-Lang observed a marked growth in the use of pragmatic language functions needed for communication in social contexts, beyond simple description. Student entries by older students moved from short, careful, declarative sentences (called "Baby English" by students, according to Staton) toward the full range of language functions in English that are the mark of a competent English user – including questioning, complaining, predicting, promising, and threatening. This range of language functions that dialogue journals—rather uniquely—call forth reflects the cognitive interests and maturity of the writer. One study with younger deaf students (9–12 years old) found a modest increase in syntactic correctness and word usage over 24 weeks, but again, there was no comparison group receiving the same classroom instruction.

In Germany, an education professor introduced dialogue journals to her teacher candidates, and then studied her students' dialogues with their deaf elementary school students, students with special needs, and adults with limited literacy during their practica. Among the findings of this research were that children with speech and language delay learned to ask questions and pay attention to word choice and spelling; children with severe cognitive delay and little or no experience with writing began to respond to written prompts and label pictures; and adult with limited literacy, who had had unpleasant experiences with formal learning, expressed a desire to learn to read and write after using dialogue journals.

More recently, research on dialogue journal use in Myanmar with deaf adults noted that dialogue journal writing was an effective means of communicating one-on-one with students who had varying English language skills and normally communicated in a Myanmar sign language or spoken Burmese. Using entries on family life, school, and work, students were able to construct short autobiographies that could be shared with their classmates.

=== Understanding, rapport, and motivation ===
Students at Gallaudet University reported valuing most the relationship with their instructor and the quality of the instructor's comments – "honesty," "interest in my ideas," and "trust." Students valued the opportunity to read and to write back in authentic exchanges, which is particularly important for those for whom written English has not been a meaningful language experience. Staton also noted that students from classes in which the instructors had chosen to use dialogue journals with high frequency (2–3 times per week) were twice as likely to re-enroll in English classes the following year and had lower dropout rates. This correlation cannot be attributed solely to dialogue journal use, as no untreated group of students with the same teachers existed for comparison, and thus teacher selection effects cannot be ruled out.

Meath-Lang pointed out that the interactive conversations create a truly student-centered language program, in which students have a voice in reconceiving and directing the curriculum itself and develop real control over their communication.

=== Development of cognitive skills through interactional scaffolding ===
The third potential outcome of dialogue journal use, development of cognitive skills, is mediated through the interactional scaffolding provided by the teacher's responses to student ideas and topics. Here the importance of having a motivated, committed teacher as an interactional partner is clear. Teachers readily use higher-order cognitive skills involved in comprehending information, such as comparing, evaluating, giving examples, predicting, requesting clarification, and elaboration. The Gallaudet report, Conversations in Writing: A Guide for Using Dialogue Journals includes reflections from Gallaudet University faculty on the value of their dialogue journal use in upper-division classes for developing engagement and cognitively demanding exchanges in topic areas, geared to individual students' actual cognitive maturity, rather than (often minimal) writing competence.

At Gallaudet, dialogue journal use with college preparatory students showed that with optimal conditions (a motivated teacher and frequent interactions [2–3 exchanges weekly]), student entries showed the development of important new skills in fluent written competence, including introducing their own topics, elaborating, responding to instructor questions, and expanding their range of language functions. Students began writing about the same topic across several turns and became collaborative, interested conversational partners in written English. Walworth described the value of dialogue journals for developing her college students' advanced reading skills in a literature course, summarized in this Wikipedia article, in the section on Reading.

=== Uses in different contexts ===
Kluwin and Kluwin and Kelly conducted a large-scale research project that paired deaf students with hearing peers as dialogue journal partners, seeking a more "realistic" practice by eliminating the time for the teacher to correspond with all students in a class. The writing ability of the hearing student partners was thought to provide the needed competence for maintaining a written conversation with middle and high school deaf students, whose reading and writing abilities in English were much lower. Kluwin's goal was to determine if dialogue journal use would improve deaf students' written English skills, as measured by sentence complexity. He observed that growth of sentence complexity was a function of the length and "tone" (defined as expressions of mutual interest and engagement) of the relationship. However, the students involved were in different classes, were paired somewhat randomly, and had no other contact with each other apart from the journal writing. The interactions were, thus, limited by the lack of shared context, motivation to interact with each other, and active teacher involvement. Most of the 204 pairs did not correspond beyond 10–12 exchanges; only 10% of the pairs reached 22–40 exchanges.

Trent Batson, a faculty member in the English Department at Gallaudet University, describes his entrée into the use of computers for dialogue journal writing with deaf university students (in the early 1980s), which he found to be transformational. He found that on the computer, he was much more authentic and engaged, the students were engaged, they had an ongoing record of their (increasingly longer and more complex) interactions, and they found themselves writing more freely and openly and revising what they wrote. Some of the students said that the dialogue journal was the best part of the course. Later, Batson took the concept of interactive writing into his entire class, establishing a computer network on which his English classes with deaf students were taught entirely in English. Before the computer network was in place, his English classes, like all classes at Gallaudet, were taught in ASL, and the writing that students did was only on assigned essays. Through the computer network, Batson made interactive uses of English available to deaf students.

Here we see two very different adaptations of dialogue journal writing, with very different outcomes. It is clear that the role of an engaged, motivated teacher is critical to the journals' success.

== Counseling ==
One of the many values of dialogue journals is the opportunity for teachers to provide informal counseling in a non-threatening, private context for individual students on their challenges and problems, whether about instructional or personal concerns. This use is closest to the goal and practice of Mrs. Reed, the original 6th grade teacher who had taken training with Dr. William Glasser on Reality Therapy for classroom teachers. The training led her to use the private written conversations to model the pragmatic, problem-solving perspective of Reality Therapy and to encourage students to think through issues and problems with her guidance. Of her writing with the students, she said, "I cannot think of any better way to learn so much about my students, myself, and my own teaching".

Studies of dialogue journal use with special needs students (reviewed in another sections of this Article) have focused on their role in helping students handle emotions, conflicts, and frustrations and build trust with adults as crucial goals of their educational development.

When dialogue journals are used with adult students in second language settings, and also in teacher preparation, personal and family concerns tend to dominate the topics introduced by both instructor and students, such as the trauma of migration for new immigrants. Anderson, Nelson, Richardson, Webb, & Young found some positive outcomes of dialogue journal use for middle school students at risk of academic failure, social isolation, and dropping out of school. A unique use of dialogue journals with adolescents in an HIV/STI prevention program found that the individualized written interactions helped assess participants' understanding and internalization of information in a way that addressed unsafe behavior, built trust, and engaged those who were less likely to participate in class discussions.

== Students with special needs ==
Students with special needs struggle not only with writing and reading acquisition, but with social and emotional development and confidence about their writing. Dialogue journals as an individualized means of private, mutual communication can provide students with support in handling emotions, conflicts, and frustrations. For students with limited writing confidence and proficiency, the opportunity to express ideas and thoughts with teacher elaboration and modeling, and without correction, has been shown to increase their time on task, writing length, and writing quality. Using a single-subject baseline and intervention design, Anderson, Nelson, Richardson, Webb, and Young explored the value of dialogue journals in developing a more supportive student-teacher relationship with emotionally and behaviorally challenged middle school students.

A case study of dialogue journal writing with a young gifted child points out that the learning styles of gifted children (rapid development, open exploration, self-motivated, dislike of rote drills) are uniquely compatible with the dynamic communication that is possible in dialogue journals. Armstrong studied the importance of teachers learning to use a wide variety of language functions to create shared mutuality and engage gifted students in written communication.

== Instructional strategies ==
A number of publications have outlined clearly instructional strategies that teachers can use to implement dialogue journal interaction effectively, both in writing and orally. The strategies that teachers use depend on the age of the students, their proficiency in the language of the interaction, and the purposes of the class and the interaction. The teacher's strategies may also be designed to affect the students' language use and learning.

Instructional strategies include establishing a culture of interactive writing by introducing the idea to students (continuous writing throughout the semester or school year); emphasizing that this is authentic communication and not for the purposes of correction or a grade; and describing the form that the interaction will take place (e.g., in a notebook, on a computer, through email), how often the interactions will take place (e.g., each day, once a week), and the topics or themes that will be the focus (if there are specific topics or themes).

Schwab (2019) shows how the writing can be used as a component of a mutually humanizing approach to teaching and learning, with the teacher and each student working together and growing alongside each other. Through a one-year examination of herself as a teacher-researcher and co-writer with her students, she examines the complexities and the power and benefits of implementing a humanizing pedagogy with adult learners.

== Teacher professional development ==
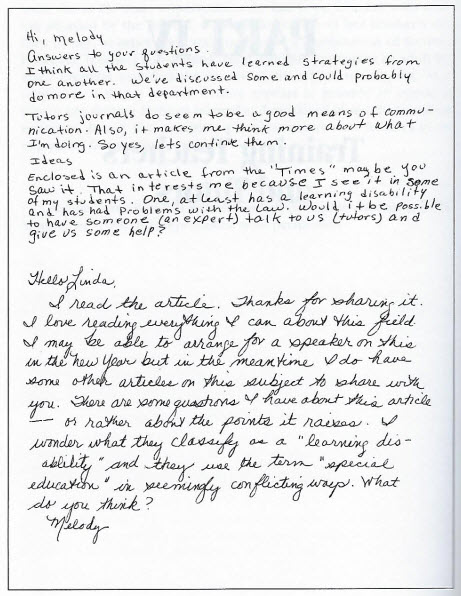
Teacher and teacher professional developer writing about an article they have read about teaching

Dialogue journal writing has become an important component of professional development for teachers in both pre-service teacher training programs at universities and in in-service workshops and coaching. It might take place between the professor and a class of prospective teachers in a teacher preparation program; between prospective or new teachers and experienced teachers they are working with, as a mentoring and coaching opportunity; or between prospective and practicing teachers. Those who use and study these approaches have found that these professional conversations promote reflection on oneself as a teacher and between teachers as they reflect on their practice. Some research focuses on the types of responses and interactions that are effective for promoting teacher learning. With use of the Internet, these interactions can take place among educators around the world.

== International settings ==
While the use of dialogue journal writing in educational settings originated in the United States, it is used around the world to promote writing and critical thinking. It is most frequently used to promote learning of English as a second language. Countries using and publishing about dialogue journal writing include Canada, Hong Kong, Hungary, India, Indonesia, Iran,,(Japan, Jordan, Korea, Malaysia, Saudi Arabia, South Africa, Taiwan, and Turkey.

An author in Indonesia (Mukti, 2016) implemented dialogue journal writing in a high school class, among other reasons, because “writing class seems to be dreary and even threatening to most of the students and arduous to most of the teachers. Students often find red marks that are not convenient to look at in their piece of writing after being corrected by the teachers. The notice written by teachers at the bottom of their composition … are intended to encourage students to improve their writing competence. Some students, however, regard these as "threats" (p. 5). When the students were asked, in a questionnaire, about the dialogue journals as an additional writing activity, most said that they were excited and relaxed to have this writing technique and that it helped them write better. Some students responded that writing in dialogue journals helped them solve their problems and alleviate their burden (p. 12).

Other studies also have had very positive results. Many found that “dialogue journal writing provided more communicative opportunities for practice writing in English. This increase in communication led students to have a more positive attitude and increased self-confidence toward writing in English as well as toward the relationship with their teacher.”. Authors conclude that “teachers of EFL [English as a foreign language] might well consider using dialogue journals as a vehicle for developing students’ writing proficiency.” They also open connections with the researcher: “The most rewarding part of journaling to the researcher was the channel of communication that opened with learners. Connecting with them and being able to understand their concerns and feelings definitely led to a better EFL learning atmosphere.”

TESOL students at Universiti Putra Malaysia during the 2009–2010 academic year were randomly assigned to a dialogue journal writing (DJW) group and a topic-based writing (TBW) group. While students' writing improved through both writing methods, the writing of the TBW group improved in terms of organization and language use. That of the DJW group improved in terms of content and vocabulary. The authors conclude that students doing DJW were focusing on the content of their messages, expressing their ideas in their comfort zone, where they "felt safe when conversing with their teachers. The trust that developed appeared to increase “the students' comfort in expressing their thoughts and ideas, without worrying about grammatical mistakes, and this resulted in improving their content and vocabulary" (Foroutan et al., 2013, p. 40). The high school students in Indonesia who wrote in dialogue journals wrote narrative texts, at the end of the 10-week writing period, with better content, organization, vocabulary, language use, and mechanics than the comparison group, who did not write in dialogue journals (Mukti, 2016).

== Outcomes research ==
Research and ethnographic observations have stressed the value of dialogue journals for increasing student engagement and motivation in the classroom. In that context, a recent meta-analysis is relevant. The analysis found that student-teacher relationships (positive and negative) had a strong association with student engagement and a small to medium effect size associated with student achievement. Thus, as dialogue journals are known and valued for creating and improving teacher-student relationships, their positive value in increasing engagement, and therefore achievement (even modestly), may be assumed.

To support and verify such assumptions about dialogue journal writing, studies will need to provide for random assignment of students to either dialogue journal writing or a control condition for a sufficient length of time, ideally within the same instructional context. Where this is not possible, carefully designed studies of individual students can yield strong research evidence. For example, Regan, Mastropiere, and Scruggs conducted a study of special-needs students using a multiple baseline design to measure outcomes of a dialogue journal intervention compared to baseline data. Studies following this design can provide a model of dialogue journal research that addresses issues of selection and maturation.

== Research findings ==
Recent research studies of dialogue journal use, using stronger research methods that include comparison or control group designs, have strengthened findings of significant outcomes from this use in instructional and mentoring settings, particularly in English as additional language instruction.

Student outcomes with substantial support in recent research articles include:

- increased student engagement and participation in written (Regan et al., 2005) and classroom discourse (Samar & Parsaie, 2025; Regan, et al., 2005; Trites, 2009)
- increase in motivation to write in the target language (Hemmati & Haghighi, 2012; Liao & Wong, 2018; Trites, 2001)
- rapport and trust with the instructor (Schwab, 2019; Rana, 2018; Jones, 1996).
- positive attitudes toward writing (Al Kayed et al., 2020) or toward instructional content such as math and science (Meel,1999; Hanrahan,1999; Shannahan et al., 2020)
- increased expressiveness and personal voice (Alsaleem, 2013; Nassaji & Cumming, 2000; Regan et al., 2005; Wang & Ruhl, 2011).
- improvement in organization of thoughts, ideas, and narrative structure (Mukti, 2016)
- reduced anxiety or “writer’s block” in second language use (David et al., 2018; Liao & Wong, 2010).

Although dialogue journal use is often motivated by impact on student progress and motivation, instructor outcomes are also significant, particularly for instructor self-reflection and understanding of students’ lived experience. (Jones, 1996; Quirke, 2018; Schwab, 2019

== Research design ==
There are emerging studies on dialogue journal use (Al Kayed et al., 2020, Mukti, 2016) which control for student maturation and learning over time, for selection effects, and for instructional and/or instructor variables by using appropriate pre- and post-treatment assessments and control or comparison group designs. These are better able to isolate the effects of dialogue journal use from expected growth in skills, instructor effectiveness, and variation in student abilities and skills.

Additional research is needed to focus on the outcomes that dialogue journals are known to impact directly: student motivation, lessened anxiety and increased confidence, attitude, rapport with instructors, self-expression, and engagement. In this context, a meta-analysis of student-teacher relationships across academic and educational settings by Roorda et al. (2011) found that positive relationships with an instructor have a strong association with increased student engagement, and a small to medium effect size associated with improved student achievement. This study supports the value of assessing dialogue journal impact on increased student engagement (Ghahremani-Ghajar & Mirhosseini) and participation in classroom discourse (Samar & Parsaie, 2025; as a function of improved student-teacher relationships. These may be considered the direct, measurable outcomes, which in turn establish a positive learning context for learner growth in competence as writers.
