= Fountas and Pinnell reading levels =

Reading comprehension scale

Fountas & Pinnell reading levels (commonly referred to as "Fountas & Pinnell") are a proprietary system of reading levels developed by Irene Fountas and Gay Su Pinnell and published by Heinemann to support their Levelled Literacy Interventions (LLI) series of student readers and teacher resource products. In its marketing material, Heinemann refers to its text levelling system by the trademark F&P Text Level Gradient.

== Overview ==
In this system, reading text is classified according to various parameters, such as word count, number of different words, number of high-frequency words, sentence length, sentence complexity, word repetitions, illustration support, etc. While classification is guided by these parameters, syllable type, an important consideration in beginning reading, is not considered as part of the leveling system. Small books containing a combination of text and illustrations are then provided to educators for each level.

While young children display a wide distribution of reading skills, each level is tentatively associated with a school grade. Some schools adopt target reading levels for their pupils. This is the grade-level equivalence chart recommended by Fountas & Pinnell.

Recommended grade	Fountas and Pinnell level
K	A, B, C, D
1	E, F, G, H, I, J
2	K, L, M
3	N, O, P
4	Q, R, S
5	T, U, V
6	W, X, Y
7 and 8	Z
High School/Adult	Z+

Alternative classifications of reading difficulties have been developed by various authors (Reading Recovery levels, DRA levels, Basal Levels, Lexile Levels, etc.).

== Criticism ==
Criticism of LLI and the Fountas and Pinnell reading levels have focused on three main issues: the amount and sequencing of phonics instruction in the series; the research evidence for the program's effectiveness; and the program's underlying model of reading.

=== Research evidence ===
The What Works Clearinghouse reported on two randomized studies of LLI with students in kindergarten through second grades and found small effects (0.22) from measures other than the assessment used within the F&P Text Level Gradient system. Additional independent research found that students in second and third grades grew significantly less on weekly progress monitoring assessment with LLI as compared to targeted small-group intervention and as compared to growth of proficient readers who received no intervention. A meta-analysis of 21 studies found that the F&P Text Level Gradient system did not lead to effective reading fluency interventions.

Matthew Burns, a reading researcher at the University of Florida, has studied assessments within the F&P Text Level Gradient system and found that they result in 54% total accuracy and correctly identify low readers only 31% of the time. Low readers also did not successfully read the books that were supposedly at their level according to the gradient system.

=== Ontario Human Rights Commission ===
The Ontario Human Rights Commission created a giant meta-report "Right to Read: public inquiry into human rights issues affecting students with reading disabilities", has in part 8 "Curriculum and instruction" devoted to criticizing whole language systems, cueing systems, and also specifically Fountas & Pinnell's balanced literacy in sections titled "Ineffective methods for teaching reading" and "Balanced Literacy".

The section on Balanced Literacy iterates "balanced literacy" as a term is deceptive, and its claims of scientific approaches are meritless. It continues to say balanced literacy is also especially harmful for at-risk students while failing all students in general.

=== Class-action lawsuit ===
On December 4, 2024, a class-action lawsuit was filed in Massachusetts, USA. The defendants are the educational publishing company Heinemann, as well as authors Lucy Calkins, Irene Fountas and Gay Su Pinnell, and others. The suit claims they falsely advertised its products as “research-backed” and “data-based".
