= Gay Su Pinnell =

American educational theorist

- Born: June 28, 1944
- Education: Ohio State University
- Scientific career
- Thesis: Language functions explorations of first grade students as observed in informal classroom environments (1975)

Gay Su Pinnell (born June 28, 1944) is an American educational theorist and a professor emerita at the School of Teaching and Learning at the Ohio State University. She is best known for her work with Irene Fountas on literacy and guided reading, a teaching framework that laid the groundwork for the Fountas and Pinnell reading levels.

== Education ==
Pinnell's parents were educators in Portales, New Mexico and Pinnell has an undergraduate degree from Eastern New Mexico University. In 1975, Pinnell earned her Ph.D. from the Ohio State University where she worked on the language with first-grade students. In 2018, Lesley University awarded Pinnell an honorary doctorate to recognize her contributions to childhood literacy.

== Career ==
Working with Irene Fountas, Pinnell developed a system of guided reading for teachers which assigns letters (A through Z, commonly known as the Fountas and Pinnell reading levels) to students based on their reading ability and comprehension. Their work is also known as leveled reading, and establishes guidelines to identify books for children by reading level. Pinnell's books include Guided Reading Good First Teaching for All Children that was reviewed by Harvard Educational Review, Literacy Quick Guide for pre-K to 8th grade, and Matching Books to Readers that was reviewed by Education Review.

Pinnell also contributed financially to literacy programs for young children, including multiple contributions to Ohio State's Literacy Collaborative and she endowed the Mary Fried Endowed Clinical Professorship at Ohio State University in 2020. Eastern New Mexico University named her Philanthropist of the Year in 2019.

== Controversy ==
Pinnell was a prominent figure featured in Sold a Story, a podcast by APM Reports, that investigates the way reading is taught in schools, specifically focusing on the influential authors and a publishing company that promote a disproven approach to reading instruction. The reporting highlights the experiences of teachers who felt misled by what they were told was the correct way to teach reading. It also investigates the company, Heinemann, and the authors, including Fountas and Pinnell, who have been instrumental in promoting this approach. These authors and their materials have been widely adopted in schools, leading to significant financial gains for the publishing company Heinemann. The report also explores the concept of "balanced literacy" and how it has been criticized by those advocating for "The Science of Reading". The report notes that 65% of fourth graders in the US are not proficient readers, and discusses how the methods promoted by Fountas and Pinnell can be detrimental to some children's reading development. In 2024, a group of parents filed a lawsuit in Massachusetts, which alleged that a group of professors and their publishers, including Pinnell, used “deceptive and fraudulent marketing” to sell their popular reading materials.

== Selected publications ==
- Fountas, Irene C.; Pinnell, Gay Su (1996). Guided reading : good first teaching for all children. Portsmouth, NH: Heinemann. ISBN 978-0435088637.
- Fountas, Irene C.; Pinnell, Gay Su (2001). Guiding readers and writers, grades 3-6 : teaching comprehension, genre, and content literacy. Portsmouth, NH. ISBN 0-325-00310-6.
- Pinnell, Gay Su; Lyons, Carol A.; DeFord, Diane E.; Bryk, Anthony S.; Seltzer, Michael (1994). "Comparing Instructional Models for the Literacy Education of High-Risk First Graders". Reading Research Quarterly. 29 (1): 9–39. doi:10.2307/747736. ISSN 0034-0553. JSTOR 747736.

== Awards ==
- Charles A. Dana Award for Pioneering Achievement in Education (1993)
- Hall of Fame, International Reading Association (1999)
- Alumni Medalist Award, Ohio State University Alumni Association (2016)
- Inaugural winner of the Diane Lapp & James Flood Professional Collaborator Award, International Literacy Association (2018)
- International Reading Association’s Albert J. Harris Award
