= Work self-efficacy =

== Background to the construct ==
Most efforts to measure self-efficacy have focused on a subject's expectations about performing specific tasks or what is referred to as "domain-specific" or "situation-specific" efficacy beliefs. However, researchers such as Sherer et al. and Chen, Gully, and Eden have validated general scales with the belief that individuals who have a history of varied and numerous experiences of success can be expected to have positive self-efficacy expectancies in a variety of situations. Accordingly, these expectancies are thought to generalize to actions beyond any specific target behavior. Noted to be a different construct than task-specific self-efficacy, though a possible predictor, general self-efficacy is thought to be a motivational state, whereas task-specific self-efficacy a motivational trait. Though both share similar antecedents, general efficacy is thought to be more resistant to ephemeral influences and more tied to other self-evaluation constructs such as self-esteem or locus of control.

While the debate on the value of a general self-efficacy construct goes on, there is also the question of whether there might be an intermediate zone between a general expectancy and a specific task domain. In particular, might there be value in defining one's expectations about performance in a general context, such as at work or at school. When it comes to work, for example, there is interest in knowing what makes some workers more capable of adjusting to new work contexts than others. Some administrators of work training and cooperative education programs have also asked what is in the "black box" of training that makes some trainees more successful than others.

== Prior experimentation ==
There has been reference to work self-efficacy in the literature through such studies as Woodruff and Cashman Bosscher and Smit Chen and Gully and Kirk and Brown. However, the measure used for work-domain self-efficacy in these studies was not derived from any specific theoretical work trying to understand and outline specific dimensions attending to the work context. Rather, these studies in each case chose items from Sherer et al.'s general self-efficacy scale presumed to apply to work. In the Kirk and Brown study, noted above, the work-domain self-efficacy scale was culled to merely 11 items from the general scale, but the authors did not use theory to guide their selection; rather they eliminated items which did not load robustly on the general scale. In examining the Scherer scale, although a few items refer specifically to work ("If I can't do a job the first time, I keep trying until I can"), most do not ("When I make plans, I am certain that I can make them work"). It could be argued that any development of a work self-efficacy inventory should progress on the basis of an explicit selection of items that apply specifically within a work context.

A published article from International Journal of Sociology and Social Policy describes a study constructed on the self-efficiency of adolescent, especially on high school teenagers, with previous work experience. The study showed that those with employment lasting for a firm duration than those with random pattern of employments has a stronger self-efficiency. In turn, the heightened self-efficiency increases the confidence level of young adults for the future anticipations of family lives, community participations, personal health and economic achievements.

== Development ==
Perhaps the first suggestion to consider self-efficacy as a theoretical framework to explain how especially novices adjust to the workplace was by Fletcher, who argued that self-efficacy may help differentiate students making the transition from pupil to practitioner. Specifically, Fletcher suggested that workplace experiences can increase self-efficacy through performance accomplishments, one source of efficacy information. Successful experiences can result in a feedback loop where performance accomplishments lead to increased self-efficacy, which, in turn, enhances a person's performance, further strengthening self-efficacy beliefs.

Numerous research studies have refined and elaborated on the application of self-efficacy theory to career development and workplace learning. There was nevertheless the task of assembling its constituents. Evidence from the value of cooperative education programs have long suggested that any persistent advantages accruing to participants in these programs are more tied to the non-technical than the technical skills they afford. By non-technical, work training administrators focus on the social skills or what is also referred to as the "soft" skills rather than the hard, subject-matter skills. In turn, authors reference social skills as human relations aptitudes considered critical in interpersonal communication. The soft skills focus as well on communication competencies, especially empathy and sensitivity, and competencies involving interacting with others, such as teamworking and giving and receiving feedback.

The self-efficacy and work performance literatures are helpful in distinguishing some of the other constituents necessary to develop a work self-efficacy scale. We know, for example, that it is not sufficient to "empower" workers and expect improved work performance without considering individual differences that might be differentiated by self-efficacy and related constructs. In particular, workers' learning orientation helps them facilitate achievement of goals that are important to them, evaluate their own competency, and enhance their self-efficacy. Further, efficacy can be augmented by the belief that one has personal control over his or her job situation, much of which emanates from an understanding and determination of one's role expectations. Self-efficacy is also shaped by how new workers become socialized into the organization or how, for example, they adjust to the politics of the new organization. Zellars et al. found that job-related self-efficacy contributed to the political skill necessary to cope with strain relationships inside an organization. Previous research has also found significant relationships between self-efficacy and ability to cope with pressure. Saks, for example, found that newcomers with high self-efficacy may be more self-sufficient and capable of coping and surviving entry experiences.

Self-efficacy has been associated with active jobs, in particular, jobs which promote active vs. passive problem-solving. Self-efficacy has also been studied as a moderator of sensitivity and interpersonal communication especially among young people. Finally, self-efficacy on particular work tasks in teams has been linked to teamwork performance.

== The work self-efficacy inventory (WS-Ei) ==
The work self-efficacy inventory was developed in the belief that there is benefit in assessing especially new or prospective workers' confidence in managing workplace experiences. Since efficacy is a malleable property, there are methods for employees to achieve relative success in their jobs within the workplace by increasing their confidence about performing a range of social behaviors. This inventory allows workers to assess and develop their work self-efficacy along a number of distinct dimensions.

Norms for the WS-Ei have set the average score for each of the dimensions and the overall composite score at 3.8 with a standard deviation of .6. The inventory has been submitted to both exploratory factor analysis (EFA) and confirmatory factor analysis (CFA) and has consistently shown itself to be highly reliable (with Cronbach Alphas in the .80 range for both subscores and overall score) and to have strong convergent and discriminant validity. It has been used in a variety of studies both in the United States and abroad, and has been linked to work performance as well as to a range of educational dimensions, such as support and retention, and to other facets of efficacy, such as academic and career.

== Forms of the WS-Ei ==
The WS-Ei has two forms, self and other.

The self version is completed by the respondent on himself or herself. The survey typically takes no more than ten to fifteen minutes to complete.

The other-rated version (which can also be filled out by the self) is a single-item test.
