= Writing anxiety =

Writing anxiety is a term for the tension, worry, nervousness, and a wide variety of other negative feelings that may occur when given a writing task. The degree to which a writer experiences these negative feelings may vary depending on the context of the writing. Some may feel anxious about writing an essay for school, but writing an email on the same topic doesn't trigger the anxiety. Others may feel fine writing a lab report, but writing a letter to loved one triggers the anxiety. Writing anxiety is therefore a situational experience that depends on a number of factors, including the writing task itself, the environment, personal and audience expectations, and one's previous experiences with writing. While writing anxiety is often used interchangeably with writer's block, writing anxiety refers to the various feelings of apprehension one associates with a writing task, while writer's block is the effect that it has on one's writing process.

== Writing Anxiety in Foreign/Second Language Learners ==
Writing anxiety in EFL (English as a Foreign Language) students is a very common factor that affects their writing performance. High levels of anxiety can cause EFL students to make simple mistakes in their writing like in grammar or with how they structure their thoughts. It can also cause EFL students to become less motivated to finish tasks and feel less confident if they lack the proper skills to write efficiently. EFL students who don't meet the required criteria in class can be perceived as "dumb" by their peers and can influence their perception of themselves. Some external causes for writing anxiety can come from the pressure to perform well in school, time constraints, or feedback from teachers that can add onto EFL students' ability to write coherently. EFL students with better writing skills or more experience often have less writing anxiety than those that are new or have less experience.

== Causes ==
Writing anxiety can occur when

- Faced with the pressures of getting good grades at school, college, or university.
- Having to adapt and learn a new writing style.
- Tight deadlines or no deadlines.
- Not understanding the writing task.

== Managing Writing Anxiety ==
There are many ways to manage writing anxiety.

- Asking for assistance from a teacher, a writing group, a friend or family member about the assignment can help understand the assignment and give a direction of which writing style and format is appropriate for the task.
- Practice writing. It is a skill that can be learned and taught, given the support and guidance from teacher, lecturers and professors.
- Have a plan of what to write out. Work out what to say, what feelings to convey to the reader, how to reach the end goal
- Breaking writing tasks into smaller, manageable steps is another effective strategy for reducing writing anxiety. Instead of attempting to complete an entire assignment at once, writers may benefit from focusing on one sentence, paragraph, or idea at a time, which can make the process feel less overwhelming and more achievable
