= Irene Fountas =

American educational theorist (born 1948)

Irene C. Fountas (born 14 August 1948) is an American educator. She is Professor Emeritus at Lesley University in Cambridge, Massachusetts. Fountas is one of the authors who wrote for educational publisher Heinemann, producing material for teaching students how to read. In 2024, a group of parents filed a lawsuit in Massachusetts, which alleged that a group of professors and their publishers, including Fountas, used “deceptive and fraudulent marketing” to sell their popular reading materials. In May 2025, a district court judge "ruled that the lawsuit against educational publisher Heinemann and three of its top authors was invalidated by a legal doctrine that bars claims of 'educational malpractice'." The lawsuit was struck down in 2025.

== See also ==
- Reading Recovery
- Gay Su Pinnell
