= Collaborative method =

Collaborative methods are processes, behaviors, and conversations that relate to the collaboration between individuals. These methods specifically aim to increase the success of teams as they engage in collaborative problem solving. Forms, rubrics, charts and graphs are useful in these situations to objectively document personal traits with the goal of improving performance in current and future projects.

== Group setup ==
Deliberate setup of a team—before beginning work—increases the potential for high performance. To do so, the following components of collaboration should be an initial focus:

== Group models ==
Four group models are common in collaboration:

Chance
Collaboration by chance is the most basic model and underlies all four. The team is a random pick of whoever is available without any specific regard for the skills or needs of each member.

Acuity
Collaboration by acuity establishes a team with balanced skill sets. The goal is to pick team members so each of the four acuities exist on the team. However, this does not mean a team of four is required as people can have varying levels of each acuity and even excel at more than one.

Interest
Collaboration by interest forms a team of persons with similar hobbies, curiosities or careers. Typically, this common interest is related to the problem the team plans to solve. While acuity is still important in this group, their common, unique knowledge may be able to overcome any weakness.

Leader
Collaboration by leader is a team model where the members are chosen by a leader. While the leader has common leadership qualities, those who assemble high performing teams also understand the process of collaboration. The goal is to pick team members with compatible values, schedules and working environments while also addressing interest and acuity.

=== Spence's basic rules ===
Spence identifies seven rules for all collaboration:

Look for common ground: find shared values, consider shared personal experiences, pay attention to and give feedback, be yourself and expect the same of others, be willing to accept differences in perception and opinions

Learn about others: consider their perspectives and needs, appeal to the highest motives, let others express themselves freely

Critique results, not people: do not waste time on personal hostility, make other people feel good, avoid criticism and put downs

Give and get respect: show respect for others' opinions, be considerate and friendly, put yourself in the other person's shoes, be responsive to emotions, speak with confidence but remain tactful

Proceed slowly: present one idea at a time, check for understanding and acceptance of each idea before moving on to the next. Speak in an organized and logical sequence.

Be explicit and clear: share your ideas and feelings, pay attention to nonverbal communication, speak clearly and make eye contact, select words that have meaning for your listeners

Remember the five "Cs" of communication: clarity, completeness, conciseness, concreteness, and correctness

=== Katzenbach and Smith's "team basics" ===
In research since 1993, Katzenbach and Smith have identified six fundamentals of collaboration that are necessary for high performing groups:

Small numbers of people—typically less than twelve

Complementary skills in team members

Common purposes for working

Specific performance goals that are commonly agreed upon

Shared working approaches

Mutual accountability amongst all members

=== Working styles ===
Two primary types of working styles exist, each benefiting from contributions of the other:

1. Alone/Quiet/Focused workers are typically self-paced, internal thinkers who are driven by goals and are conscious of ownership issues. They are usually best at expressing themselves in writing.
2. Shared/High-Energy/Dynamic workers are typically fast-paced, external thinkers who are conceptual/visionary and work towards building consensus in real-time. They are usually best at expressing themselves verbally.

Conflict between these groups typically occurs when group one becomes passive aggressive or group two becomes outwardly aggressive. Managing expectations, building consensus and communicating well are ways to avoid conflict.

=== Acuity ===
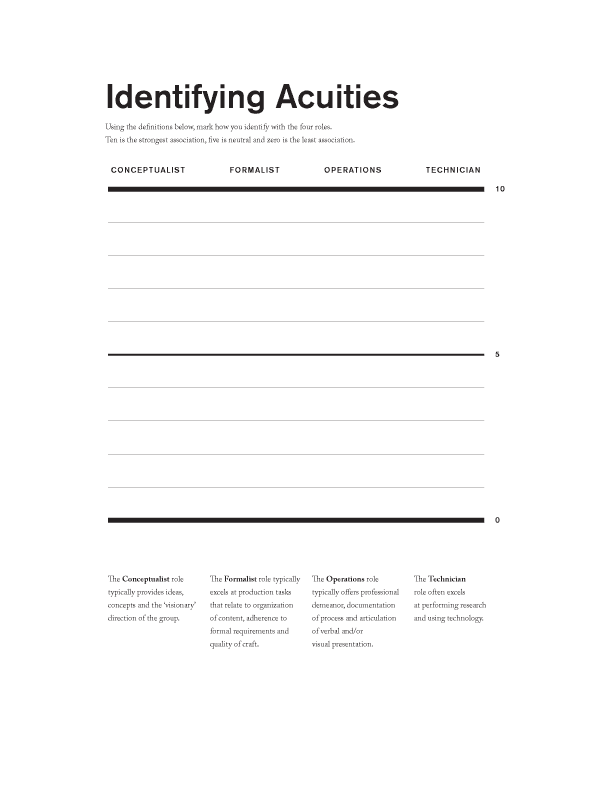
A chart used to identify the acuities of people, particularly for use in assigning roles in collaboration.

While psychologist Howard Gardner identified seven major realms of intelligence, a more simple set of acuities may be more useful within smaller groups. Four roles have been identified and are defined as follows (note that individuals may score high in more than one category):

The conceptualist role typically provides ideas, concepts and the 'visionary' direction of the group

The formalist role typically excels at production tasks that relate to organization of content, adherence to formal requirements and quality of craft

The operations role typically offers professional demeanor, documentation of process and articulation of verbal and/or visual presentation

The technician role often excels at performing research and using technology

Higher performing teams often have a diverse set of skills and an appropriate number of persons in each role—as required by the goal of the team.

=== Thinking styles ===
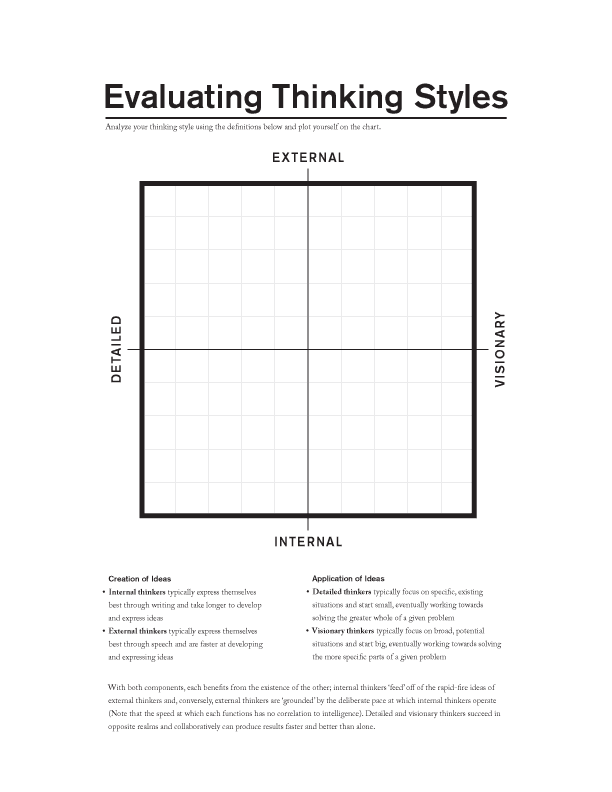
A chart used to evaluate the thinking style of persons, particularly for use in collaborative teams.

There are two main components of thinking styles: internal and external, they share similarities to the extraversion and introversion traits seen in human personalities. The two thinking styles are dichotomies and can be used as axes when charting personal evaluation; note that "there is no 'right' place on the grid."

==== Creation of ideas ====
Internal thinkers typically express themselves best through writing and take longer to develop and express ideas.

External thinkers typically express themselves best through speech and are faster at developing and expressing ideas.

==== Application of ideas ====
Detailed thinkers typically focus on specific, existing situations and start small, eventually working towards solving the greater whole of a given problem.

Visionary thinkers typically focus on broad, potential situations and start big, eventually working towards solving the more specific parts of a given problem

With both thinking styles, each benefits from the existence of the other; internal thinkers 'feed' off of the rapid-fire ideas of external thinkers and, conversely, external thinkers are 'grounded' by the deliberate pace at which internal thinkers operate (Note that the speed at which each functions has no correlation to intelligence). Detailed and visionary thinkers succeed in opposite realms and collaboratively can produce results faster and better than alone.

=== Learning styles ===
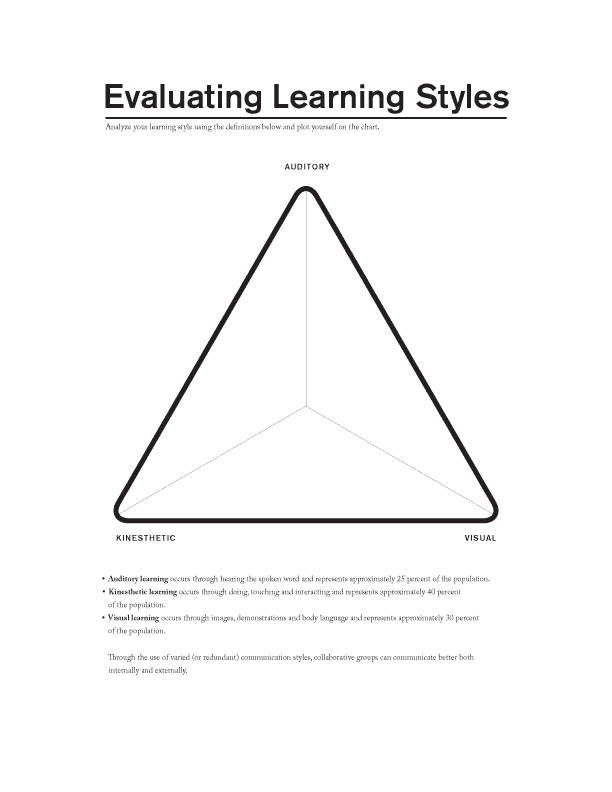
A chart used to identify the learning styles of people, particularly for use in analyzing communication needs in collaboration.

For collaboration purposes, three learning styles are typically identified:

- Auditory learning occurs through hearing the spoken word and represents approximately 25% of the population
- Kinesthetic learning occurs through doing, touching and interacting and represents approximately 40% of the population
- Visual learning occurs through images, demonstrations and body language and represents approximately 30% of the population

Through the use of varied (or redundant) communication styles, collaborative groups can communicate better both internally and externally.

Agreeing upon group values is a step that "sets the tone" for further work. This is a convenient warm-up activity for a group and most commonly involves brainstorming a list and then picking a "top-ten." Spence recommends that this is a high-priority item for the first meeting. Values may be grouped into categories, but each is up to debate:

Healthy values and habits (Sensual and Operational Values) — Sensual values are individual values and are functional or dysfunctional to an individual's emotional survival. They are sensitive or insensitive depending upon an individual's emotional maturity. Operational values are individual values and are functional or dysfunctional to an individual's physical survival. They are active or inactive depending upon an individual's physical development. Healthy values and habits are acquired through personal satisfaction, practice and personal experience.

Moral values and norms (Social and Religious/Traditional Values) — Social values are family/group values and are functional or dysfunctional to the survival of the family/group. They are nurturing or aggressive depending upon the family/group's social maturity. Religious/Traditional values are interpersonal values and are functional or dysfunctional to impersonal survival outside the family/group. They are tolerant or intolerant depending upon the religion's/tradition's maturity. Moral values are acquired through encouragement, instruction and interpersonal experience.

Ethical values and behavior (Economic and Political Values) — Economic values are national values and are functional or dysfunctional to the survival of the nation. They are productive or unproductive depending upon the nation's economic development. Political values are national values and are functional or dysfunctional to national survival. They are progressive or regressive depending upon a nation's political development. Ethical values are acquired through rewards, education and impersonal experience.

== Group functions ==
Collaborative groups often work together in the same environment but may also utilize information technology—collaborative software in particular—to overcome geographic limitations. As a group works to meet its goals, the following components should be included to sustain effective collaboration:

=== Interpersonal communication ===
Spence states that communication is composed of the following:

- 52% based on body language
- 37% based on the tone of voice
- 11% based on words

In collaborative groups, two styles of communication are likely to be found:

- Indirect communicators are typically persons who use intuitive means to understand the needs and desires of others. They find direct questions difficult to answer and direct communication rude and insensitive.
- Direct communicators are typically persons who use conscious thought to understand the needs and desires of others, they ask questions directly and expect direct responses

Spence adds that there are three major steps to listening that facilitate learning and show respect for the speaker:

1. Focus your mind on the person speaking
2. Use body language to signal attention and interests
3. Verbally reflect and respond to what the speaker feels and says

=== Respect ===
In collaboration, respect is a critical component of group performance and is given and/or received in two distinctly different ways:

The give none model of collaborative respect is seen when individuals or teams expect others to earn respect based on the actions of those persons. This often occurs inside organizations, businesses and other groups where there is an existing commonality. Persons joining a collaborative team must prove what they can do and how they are valuable to the group to gain respect and continue working with the group.

The give all model of collaborative respect occurs when individuals or teams provide others with respect and—through interaction—may lose or maintain their level of respect. This often occurs when already established and functioning collaborative teams invite a new group or team to join. These new members have often already shown their work to be of high quality and face expectations to deliver such quality for their new team.

=== Ideation ===
This divergent stage of collaboration is where ideas are developed. Group activities in this stage are typically called brainstorming. There are four basic rules in brainstorming. These are intended to reduce the social inhibitions that occur in groups and therefore stimulate the generation of new ideas. The expected result is a dynamic synergy that will dramatically increase the creativity of the group.

Focus on quantity: This rule is a means of enhancing divergent production, aiming to facilitate problem solving through the maxim, quantity breeds quality. The assumption is that the greater the number of ideas generated, the greater the chance of producing a radical and effective solution.

No criticism: It is often emphasized that in group brainstorming, criticism should be put 'on hold'. Instead of immediately stating what might be wrong with an idea, the participants focus on extending or adding to it, reserving criticism for a later 'critical stage' of the process. By suspending judgment, one creates a supportive atmosphere where participants feel free to generate unusual ideas.

Unusual ideas are welcome: To get a good and long list of ideas, unusual ideas are welcomed. They may open new ways of thinking and provide better solutions than regular ideas. They can be generated by looking from another perspective or setting aside assumptions.

Combine and improve ideas: Good ideas can be combined to form a single very good idea, as suggested by the slogan "1+1=3". This approach is assumed to lead to better and more complete ideas than merely generating new ideas alone. It is believed to stimulate the building of ideas by a process of association.

==== Exercises ====
Clustering is often used to define and understand the basic thematics of the topic (such as 'danger,' as seen in the image). What follows is approximately 10–15 minutes of clustering and writing of anything and everything that comes to mind—whether related or unrelated and opposing or supporting. Next, to move forward and solidify group understanding, a voting process is used to identify the most thought-provoking or applicable statements about each basic thematic; finally, the group shares and discusses observations. The critical caveat of the writing and voting portion is that they both are performed silently, unjudging, divergently and done with confidence that every contribution is critical.

Grouping is often used to agree on actions, items and properties within specific categories of a project. In creative problem solving—game design, for example—the categories "Duration, Purpose/Goal, Theme, Primary Activity, Physicality, Challenge, Audience and Location/Environment" might be used.

=== Consensus ===
This convergent stage of collaboration is necessary to move forward from stages of ideation.

==== Voting ====
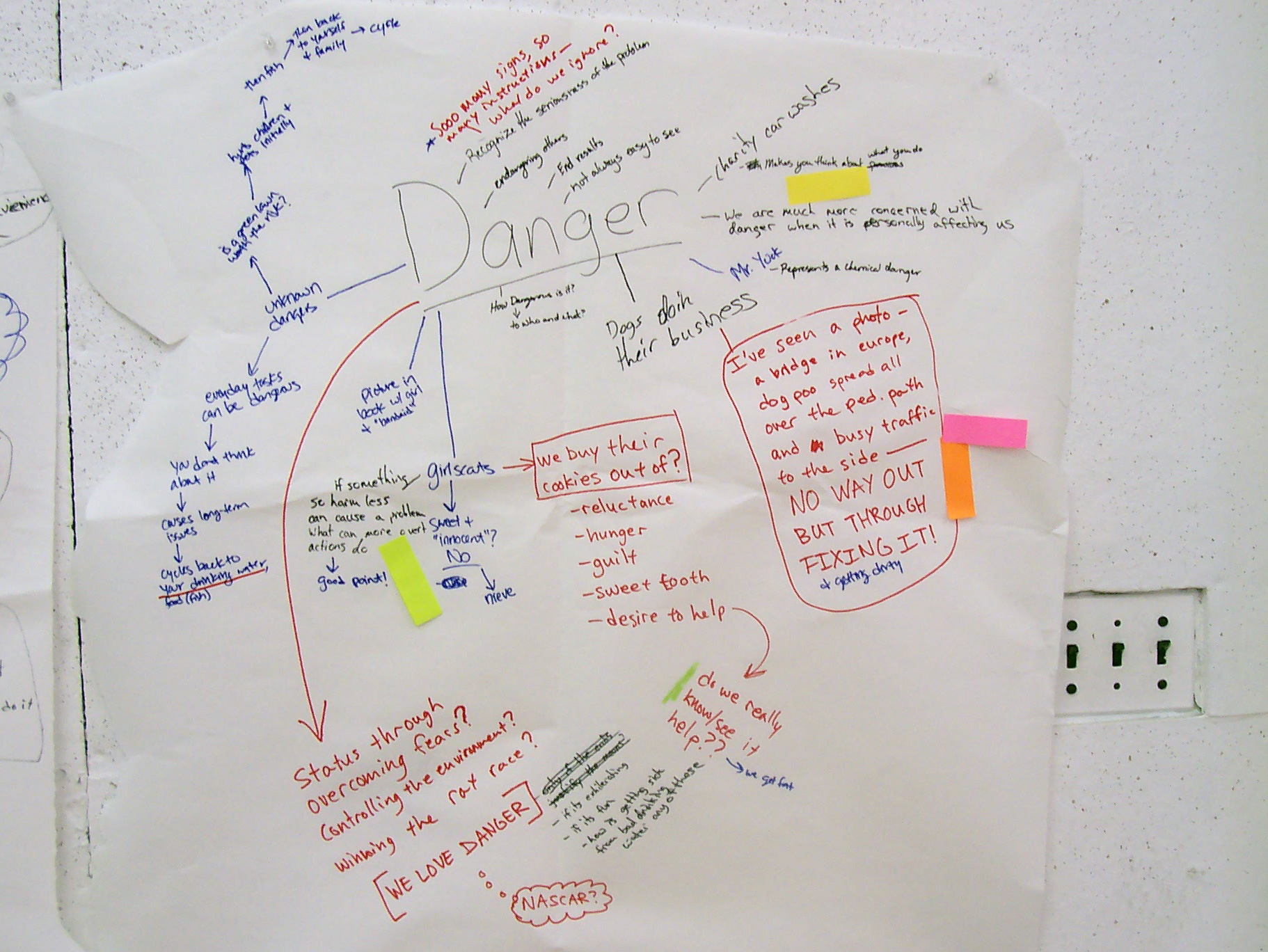
Collaborative writing exercises ("clustering" is shown here) can be used for development of ideas. Colored tabs of paper—attached to the large page—are used in a collaborative voting exercise to gain consensus.

Polling the opinions of all group members is necessary to equalize ownership of the collaborative project. There are two principal ways to do this through voting:

- Written voting is a more formal method of establishing consensus that is useful to avoid conflict and pick specific means of proceeding. This is typically done in silence and is particularly valuable to engage internal thinkers.
- Verbal voting can be useful to informally make decisions that are not conflict-prone. This method works well for debate of abstract topics or as a means of "checking-in," if consensus is already suspected.

Varying means of voting exist, each having their strengths and weaknesses:

- A single vote per person is most useful to make final decisions where only a limited number of options exist
- N votes per person can be given, where N is the desired number of 'surviving' options
- One hundred votes per person can be given in total and works like "percentages," where any number of votes can be given to an option. This is best suited for initial decision-making when a large number of diverse options exist.

=== Performance analysis ===
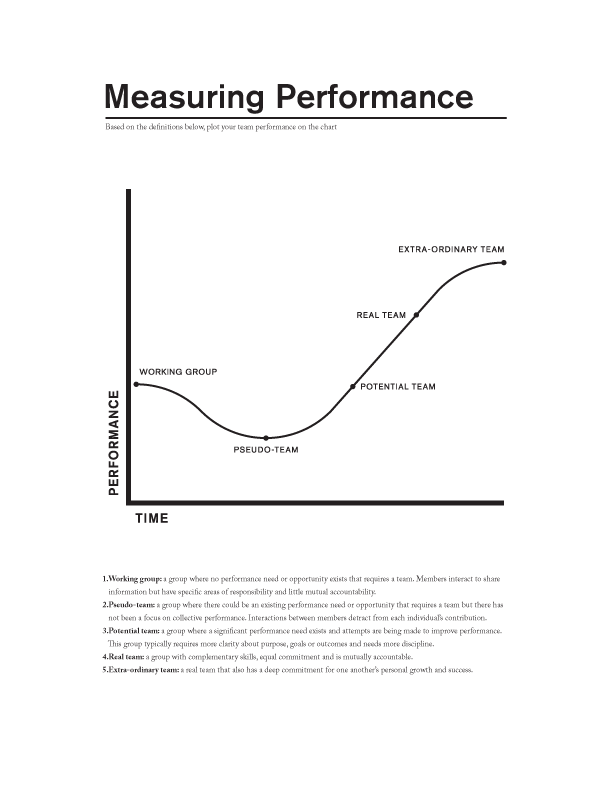
A chart to measure the performance of a group

In Katzenbach and Smith's research, five team classifications have been established:

1. Working group: a group where no performance need or opportunity exists that requires a team. Members interact to share information but have specific areas of responsibility and little mutual accountability.
2. Pseudo-team: a group where there could be an existing performance need or opportunity that requires a team but there has not been a focus on collective performance. Interactions between members detract from each individual’s contribution.
3. Potential team: a group where a significant performance need exists and attempts are being made to improve performance. This group typically requires more clarity about purpose, goals or outcomes and needs more discipline.
4. Real team: a group with complementary skills, equal commitment and is mutually accountable.
5. Extraordinary team: a real team that also has a deep commitment for one another’s personal growth and success.

== Barriers to effective collaboration ==
A main barrier to collaboration may be the difficulty in achieving agreement when diverse viewpoints exist. This can make effective decision-making more difficult. Even if collaboration members do manage to agree they are very likely to be agreeing from a different perspective. This is often called a cultural boundary. For example:

- A culture where rank or job title is important makes it hard for a lower rank person, who may be more qualified than their superior for the job, to collaborate. The lower rank person is told what to do. This is not collaboration
- "stranger danger"; which can be expressed as a reluctance to share with others unknown to you
- "needle in a haystack"; people believe that others may have already solved your problem but how do you find them
- "hoarding"; where people do not want to share knowledge because they see hoarding as a source of power
- "Not Invented Here"; the avoidance of previously performed research or knowledge that was not originally developed within the group/institution.

== Group conclusion ==
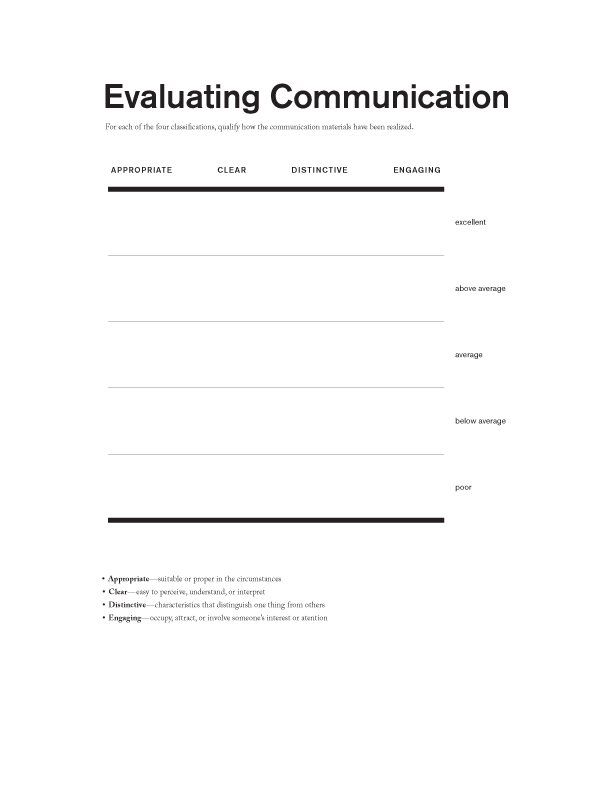
A chart to evaluate four aspects of communication materials.

When a group has completed their objectives, introspection and self-critique are necessary to provide growth from the collaborative work experience. This stage also can be used to identify further work to be performed. Documentation of previous group actions become particularly useful at this stage. Spence recommends that to evaluate collaborative output, individuals must "attack projects, not people." Using the values and goals agreed upon in the 'setup' phase allows group members to make objective, authoritative critique of performance.

Spence states that group members who have worked as Katzenbach and Smith's "real team" will typically experience a strong desire to continue working collaboratively and may even find that performance as an individual unit may suffer.

== See also ==
- Appreciative inquiry
- Attitude (psychology)
- Competency model
- Conflict resolution
- Devil's advocate
- Game theory
- Group dynamics
- Polytely
- Icebreaker (facilitation)
- Industrial and organizational psychology
- Leadership
- Managerial grid model
- Maslow's hierarchy of needs
- Metacognition
- Myers-Briggs Type Indicator
- Organizational studies
- Social psychology
- Sociomapping
