= Educational therapy =

Educational Therapy
- ICD-9-CM: 93.82

Educational Therapy (aka ET) is a form of therapy used to treat individuals with learning differences, disabilities, and challenges. This form of therapy offers a wide range of intensive interventions that are designed to resolve learners' learning problems. These interventions are individualized and unique to the specific learner.

== Description ==
This type of therapy helps the student strengthen their ability to learn. The student engages in activities that help their academics comprehension, as well as, teach them skills in processing, focusing, and memory. There is a difference between traditional tutoring and educational therapy. Traditional tutoring deals specifically with academics while educational therapy deals with both the processing of information and academics. The educational therapist uses a variety of methodologies and teaching materials to help the student build on their academic competency.

Processing is the way students think and learn. All students learn differently and process information in a unique manner. Information is taken in through the five senses. Some students learn better by watching (visual learning) while others learn better by hearing (auditory learning). The students who seem to do worse in the traditional school setting learn best by doing (kinesthetic learning). If these students are taught to strengthen their weakest learning systems, then learning becomes easier and more efficient.

Some students have problems focusing. Attention deficits make the student less receptive to learning. If the student is not receptive to the information being presented, the student does not learn. Traditional methods involve helping the student improve, on the other hand, educational therapists work with students and teach them how to focus and attend to what is being presented to them.

Students today are expected to hold vast amounts of information in their memory banks. Many students are weak in this area as well. Memory skills can be strengthened like any skill, which in turn affects academics in a positive manner.

Cross lateral kinesthetic exercises may be used to strengthen proprioception skills. These physical exercises are thought to strengthen cognitive skills.

By addressing the processing of information, focusing issues, and memory skills, as well as academics, the educational therapist is better able to treat the underlying problem of the learning issue that is keeping the student from succeeding in the academic arena. This sometimes seems illogical to people, as they feel that the only way to fix an academic problem is to offer more academics. This rarely is a long-term solution to the problem of poor academics, since piling on more academics only fatigues and burdens an already frustrated student. Educational therapy is better equipped to deal with the problem of processing information. This in turn leads to stronger academics.

Educational therapy addresses the underlying learning skills that affect academics. These skills would include visual and auditory processing, attention, and focusing as well as memory skills. The student only receives instruction or help in the skills that he/she is weak in.

The goals of educational therapy's treatment plan include developing clients' strategic use of strengths to foster learning, develop autonomy and understand the relationship between learning and social/emotional functioning.

== History ==
In the 1940s, parallel development in the field took place in Europe and the United States, influenced by the work of pioneers like August Aichorn and Katrina DeHirsch, in Germany. DeHirsch wrote of the "treatment alliance" between the educational therapist and the child, while distinguishing the differences between educational therapy and psychotherapy.

In the UK in the 1960s, Irene Caspari, Principal Psychologist at the Tavistock Centre, London, became a leading trainer and exponent of a more psychoanalytic version of educational therapy, leaving money for the establishment of a 'Forum for the Advancement of Educational Therapy'. It was Caspari's belief that a child might learn more effectively when an academic learning program went hand in hand with 'expression work' which tapped into a child's deeper feelings, and that it therefore behoved the therapist to be aware of, and to work with, such feelings as well as with his/her own relationship with the child as a learner.

== Application ==
Educational therapy has been used to treat:

- Dyslexia
- Non-verbal learning disorder
- Reading and writing difficulties (dysgraphia)
- Math disabilities (dyscalculia)
- Attention deficit disorder/ attention deficit hyperactivity disorder
- Asperger's syndrome
- Fragile X
- Tourette syndrome
- Language processing problems
- Visual processing problems
- Poor motivation
- Low academic self-esteem
- Poor organizational and study skills
- School and test anxiety
- Poor social skills
- School placement and retention
