= WDHB =

- Type: Private Limited
- Industry: Executive Education
- Founder: Pascal Baudry
- Headquarters: Denver, Colorado
- Key people: Sunil Narang (CEO)
- Website: www.wdhb.com

WDHB Inc. is an international consultancy specializing in immersive education programs for corporate executives. Founded in Berkeley, California in 1989 by Pascal Baudry, WDHB was the first company to establish the concept of a Learning Expedition as a new international learning experience for business leaders. In 2003, the firm was acquired by Sunil Narang and relocated its global headquarters to Denver, Colorado.

== 2020–present ==
In 2020, WDHB acquired the Charlotte-headquartered company Experience to Lead with an aim to strategically expand its team during the COVID-19 pandemic.

In October 2025, WDHB acquired Adaptive Cultures, an organization based in Melbourne, a move that expanded WDHB's offerings to include both experiential learning and cultural evolution for organizations. Following this expansion, WDHB Inc. became the parent organization of the WDHB Group. In 2026, Imane Terrab, WDHB's VP of Thought Leadership, founded Alif Narrative Intelligence, furthering the current portfolio of companies within the WDHB Group.

In addition to its Denver headquarters, the company operates with international offices in Paris, Singapore, Zurich, and Shanghai.

== Services ==
The company's signature offerings include Strategic Learning Expeditions and Leadership Development Experiences, which are tailored for and offered to executives of a single company, and represent the fastest growing segment of the executive education market. WDHB uses various methodologies, including design thinking and their proprietary Threaded Learning framework to build its programs in cooperation with clients. Programs include a large variety of activities, such as immersive visits and hands-on workshops that take place outside of the office and classroom, as well as daily debriefings. Learning Expedition themes have included evolutions in retail & customer centricity, fostering a culture of innovation, media, mobile lifestyles and models of collaboration.

WDHB's president and CEO, Sunil Narang, is a regular speaker on experiential learning and change management. The company's founder, Pascal Baudry, is a psychoanalyst, engineer, intercultural expert and author.
