= Multisensory learning =

Learning with the use of more than one sense

Multisensory learning is the assumption that individuals learn better if they are taught using more than one sense (modality). The senses usually employed in multisensory learning are visual, auditory, kinesthetic, and tactile – VAKT (i.e. seeing, hearing, doing, and touching). Other senses might include smell, taste and balance (e.g. making vegetable soup or riding a bicycle).

Multisensory learning is different from learning styles which is the assumption that people can be classified according to their learning style (audio, visual or kinesthetic). However, critics of learning styles say there is no consistent evidence that identifying an individual student's learning style and teaching for that style will produce better outcomes. Consequently, learning styles has not received widespread support from scientists, nor has it proven to be effective in the classroom. (Note: Sources:) A 2025 meta-analysis explored the distinction between learning styles and learning strategies, concluding that we should not perpetuate the myths and unsupported claims about learning styles. Instead, educators should focus more on learning strategies that "can foster a more robust and flexible learning environment by emphasizing critical thinking, self-regulation, and meaningful engagement with content". (For more on this see learning styles.)

Reports suggest the human brain has evolved to process multisensory signals, making it more natural than unisensory processing. Recent research has made clear that multisensory processing of information is part of daily life, whereby the brain integrates the information from different modalities (senses) into a coherent mental perception.

== Benefits, effectiveness, and limitations ==
Some studies conclude that the benefits of multisensory learning are greatest if the senses are engaged concurrently (see Multisensory integration) and the instruction is direct (explicit) and systematic (see Pre-attentive processing § Multisensory integration). However, some neurologists question whether more is "actually better for learners who are struggling". The rationale is that learners with developmental disorders may have impairments in cognitive control, planning, and attention, so multisensory integration might place additional demands on systems that are already straining. Consequently, it is suggested that it may be better to narrow the alternatives to one that works. Other studies suggest that multisensory integration only develops optimally by middle childhood (i.e. eight years of age or older).

One of the oldest proponents of multisensory phonics for remedial reading instruction is Orton-Gillingham (OG), dating back to 1935. Amongst other approaches, it suggests the use of different mediums when teaching (e.g., sand, rice, or hair gel). What Works Clearinghouse, a part of the Institute of Education Sciences reports there is a lack of studies meeting its strict evidence standards so it is "unable to draw any conclusions about the effectiveness or ineffectiveness of unbranded Orton-Gillingham–based strategies for students with learning disabilities". However, Best Evidence Encyclopedia, a part of Johns Hopkins School of Education found one qualifying study that showed an effect size of +0.43, but it is not clear if this is because the instruction is also explicit and systematic. A meta study in 2021 concluded that, although the mean ES was positive in favor, OG methods do not significantly improve outcomes for foundational skills, vocabulary, or comprehension.

According to the U.K. Independent review of the teaching of early reading (Rose Report 2006) multisensory learning is also effective because it keeps students more engaged in their learning, however, it does not recommend a specific type of multisensory learning activity. In 2010 the U.K. Department for Education established the core criteria for programs that teach school children to read by using systematic Synthetic phonics. It includes a requirement that the material "uses a multi-sensory approach so that children learn variously from simultaneous visual, auditory and kinaesthetic activities which are designed to secure essential phonic knowledge and skills". There are other studies that support activity-based learning because it improves focus and memory retention.

The following organizations recommend multisensory instruction for learners with a learning disability: The International Dyslexia Association (IDA) and the National Institute of Child Health and Human Development (NICHD). And one study says there is strong support for using multisensory experiences to increase the focus of students with special needs.

A 2022 meta-analysis of studies related to the use of multi-sensory learning to teach children with or at risk for dyslexia does not suggest that multi-sensory instruction is more effective. Instead, it supports the use of limited and precious time on the key ingredient – instruction that is explicit and systematic.

== See also ==
- Cognitive psychology
- Crossmodal
- e-learning (theory) – the cognitive science principles of effective multimedia learning using electronic educational technology
- Multimodality
- National Reading Panel
- Sensory processing
- Sensory processing disorder
- Stimulus modality § Multimodal perception
