= Gregorc =

Gregorc is a surname. Notable people with the surname include:

- Anthony Gregorc, American psychologist
- Blaž Gregorc (born 1990), Slovene ice hockey player
- Luka Gregorc (born 1984), Slovene tennis player
- Miha Gregorc (born 1979), Slovene tennis player
