= Learning styles =

Theories that aim to account for differences in individuals' learning

Learning styles refer to a range of theories that aim to account for differences in individuals' learning. Although there is ample evidence that individuals express personal preferences on how they prefer to receive information, few studies have found validity in using learning styles in education. Many theories share the proposition that humans can be classified according to their "style" of learning, but differ on how the proposed styles should be defined, categorized and assessed. A common concept is that individuals differ in how they learn.

The idea of individualized learning styles became popular in the 1970s. This has greatly influenced education despite the criticism that the idea has received from some researchers. Proponents recommend that teachers run a needs analysis to assess the learning styles of their students and adapt their classroom methods to best fit each student's learning style. There are many different types of learning models that have been created and used since the 1970s. Many of the models have similar fundamental ideas and are derived from other existing models, such as the change from the VAK model to the VARK model. However, critics of learning styles say that there is no consistent evidence that better student outcomes result from identifying individual students' learning style and matching teaching to specific learning styles.

== Overview of models ==
There are many different learning styles models; one literature review identified 71 different models. Only a few models are described below.

=== David Kolb's model ===
A graphical representation of David Kolb's model, placing the grasping and the transformation of experiences along the axes

David A. Kolb's model is based on his experiential learning model, as explained in his book Experiential Learning. Kolb's model outlines two related approaches toward grasping experience: Concrete Experience and Abstract Conceptualization, as well as two related approaches toward transforming experience: Reflective Observation and Active Experimentation. According to Kolb's model, the ideal learning process engages all four of these modes in response to situational demands; they form a learning cycle from experience to observation to conceptualization to experimentation and back to experience. In order for learning to be effective, Kolb postulated, all four of these approaches must be incorporated. As individuals attempt to use all four approaches, they may tend to develop strengths in one experience-grasping approach and one experience-transforming approach, leading them to prefer one of the following four learning styles:

1. Accommodator = Concrete Experience + Active Experiment: strong in "hands-on" practical doing (e.g., physical therapists)
2. Converger = Abstract Conceptualization + Active Experiment: strong in practical "hands-on" application of theories (e.g., engineers)
3. Diverger = Concrete Experience + Reflective Observation: strong in imaginative ability and discussion (e.g., social workers)
4. Assimilator = Abstract Conceptualization + Reflective Observation: strong in inductive reasoning and creation of theories (e.g., philosophers)

Kolb's model gave rise to the Learning Style Inventory, an assessment method used to determine an individual's learning style. According to this model, individuals may exhibit a preference for one of the four styles—Accommodating, Converging, Diverging and Assimilating—depending on their approach to learning in Kolb's experiential learning model.

=== Peter Honey and Alan Mumford's model ===
Peter Honey and Alan Mumford adapted Kolb's experiential learning model. First, they renamed the stages in the learning cycle to accord with managerial experiences: having an experience, reviewing the experience, concluding from the experience, and planning the next steps. Second, they aligned these stages to four learning styles named:

1. Activist
2. Reflector
3. Theorist
4. Pragmatist

These learning styles are not innate to an individual but rather are developed based on an individual's experiences and preferences. Based on this model, the Honey and Mumford's Learning Styles Questionnaire (LSQ) was developed to allow individuals to assess and reflect on how they consume information and learn from their experiences. It serves as an alternative to Kolb's LSI as it directly asks about common behaviors found in the workplace compared to judging how an individual learns. Having completed the self-assessment, managers are encouraged to focus on strengthening underutilized styles in order to become better equipped to learn from a wide range of everyday experiences. A MORI survey commissioned by The Campaign for Learning in 1999 found the Honey and Mumford LSQ to be the most widely used system for assessing preferred learning styles in the local government sector in the UK.

=== Learning modalities ===
Walter Burke Barbe and colleagues proposed three learning modalities (often identified by the acronym VAK):

1. Visualizing modality
2. Auditory modality
3. Kinesthetic modality

Descriptions of learning modalities
Visual	Kinesthetic/tactile	Auditory
Picture	Gestures	Listening
Shape	Body movements	Rhythms
Sculpture	Object manipulation	Tone
Paintings	Positioning	Chants

Barbe and colleagues reported that learning modality strengths can occur independently or in combination (although the most frequent modality strengths, according to their research, are visual or mixed), they can change over time, and they become integrated with age. They also pointed out that learning modality strengths are different from preferences; a person's self-reported modality preference may not correspond to their empirically measured modality strength. This disconnect between strengths and preferences was confirmed by a subsequent study. Nevertheless, some scholars have criticized the VAK model. Psychologist Scott Lilienfeld and colleagues have argued that much use of the VAK model is nothing more than pseudoscience or a psychological urban legend.

=== Neil Fleming's VAK/VARK model ===
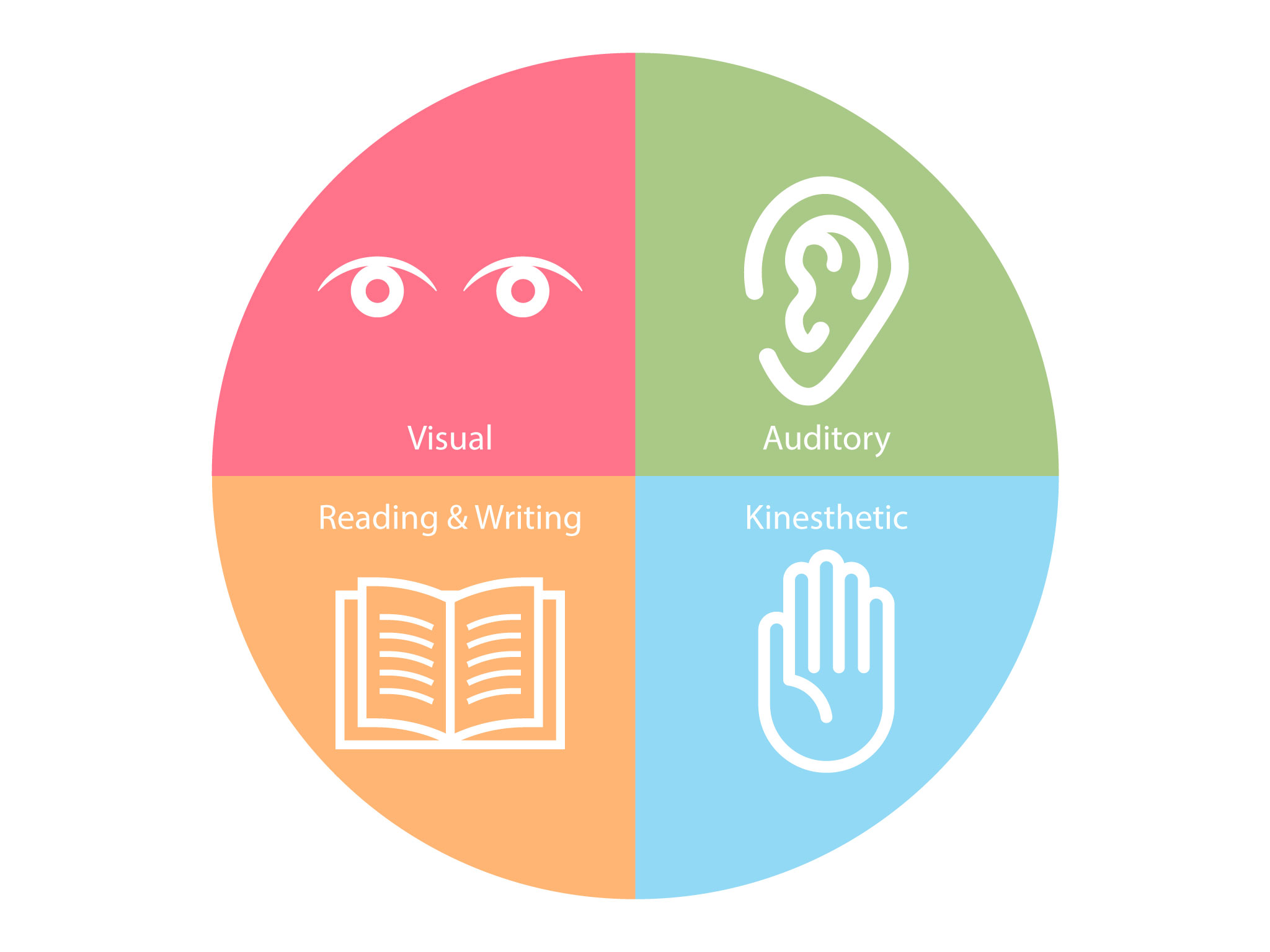
Visual representation of the 4 learning styles

Neil Fleming's VARK model and inventory expanded upon earlier notions of sensory modalities such as the VAK model of Barbe and colleagues and the representational systems (VAKOG) in neuro-linguistic programming. The four sensory modalities in Fleming's model are:

1. Visual learning
2. Aural learning
3. Reading/writing learning
4. Kinesthetic learning

While the fifth modality is not considered one of the four learning styles, it covers those who fit equally among two or more areas, or without one frontrunner:

5. Multimodality (MM)

Fleming claimed that visual learners have a preference for seeing (visual aids that represent ideas using methods other than words, such as graphs, charts, diagrams, symbols, etc.). Subsequent neuroimaging research has suggested that visual learners convert words into images in the brain and vice versa, but some psychologists have argued that this "is not an instance of learning styles, rather, it is an instance of ability appearing as a style". Likewise, Fleming claimed that auditory learners best learn through listening (lectures, discussions, tapes, etc.), and tactile/kinesthetic learners prefer to learn via experience—moving, touching, and doing (active exploration of the world, science projects, experiments, etc.). Students can use the model and inventory to identify their preferred learning style and, it is claimed, improve their learning by focusing on the mode that benefits them the most. Fleming's model also posits two types of multimodality. This means that not everyone has one defined preferred modality of learning; some people may have a mixture that makes up their preferred learning style. There are two types of multimodality learners: VARK type one learners are able to assimilate their learning style to those around them. VARK type two learners need to receive input or output in all of their preferred styles. They will continue to work until all preferred learning areas have been met.

=== Gregorc & Butler's model ===
Anthony Gregorc and Kathleen Butler organized a model describing different learning styles rooted in the way individuals acquire and process information differently. This model posits that an individual's perceptual abilities are the foundation of his or her specific learning strengths, or learning styles.

In this model, there are two perceptual qualities: concrete and abstract, and two ordering abilities: random and sequential. Concrete perceptions involve registering information through the five senses, while abstract perceptions involve the understanding of ideas, qualities, and concepts which cannot be seen. In regard to the two ordering abilities, sequential ordering involves the organization of information in a linear, logical way, and random ordering involves the organization of information in chunks and in no specific order. The model posits that both of the perceptual qualities and both of the ordering abilities are present in each individual, but some qualities and ordering abilities are more dominant within certain individuals.

There are four combinations of perceptual qualities and ordering abilities based on dominance: concrete sequential, abstract random, abstract sequential, and concrete random. The model posits that individuals with different combinations learn in different ways—they have different strengths, different things make sense to them, different things are difficult for them, and they ask different questions throughout the learning process.

The validity of Gregorc's model has been questioned by Thomas Reio and Albert Wiswell following experimental trials. Gregorc argues that his critics have "scientifically-limited views" and that they wrongly repudiate the "mystical elements" of "the spirit" that can only be discerned by a "subtle human instrument".

=== Cognitive approaches ===
Anthony Grasha and Sheryl Riechmann, in 1974, formulated the Grasha-Reichmann Learning Style Scale. It was developed to analyze the attitudes of students and how they approach learning. The test was originally designed to provide teachers with insight on how to approach instructional plans for college students. Grasha's background was in cognitive processes and coping techniques. Unlike some models of cognitive styles which are relatively nonjudgmental, Grasha and Riechmann distinguish between adaptive and maladaptive styles. The names of Grasha and Riechmann's learning styles are:

- avoidant
- participative
- competitive
- collaborative
- dependent
- independent

Aiming to explain why aptitude tests, school grades, and classroom performance often fail to identify real ability, Robert Sternberg listed various cognitive dimensions in his book Thinking Styles. Several other models are also often used when researching cognitive styles; some of these models are described in books that Sternberg co-edited, such as Perspectives on Thinking, Learning, and Cognitive Styles.

=== NASSP model ===
In the 1980s, the National Association of Secondary School Principals (NASSP) formed a task force to study learning styles. The task force defined three broad categories of style—cognitive, affective, and physiological—and 31 variables, including the perceptual strengths and preferences from the VAK model of Barbe and colleagues, but also many other variables such as need for structure, types of motivation, time of day preferences, and so on. They defined a learning style as "a gestalt—not an amalgam of related characteristics but greater than any of its parts. It is a composite of internal and external operations based in neurobiology, personality, and human development and reflected in learner behavior."

- Cognitive styles are preferred ways of perception, organization and retention.
- Affective styles represent the motivational dimensions of the learning personality; each learner has a personal motivational approach.
- Physiological styles are bodily states or predispositions, including sex-related differences, health and nutrition, and reaction to physical surroundings, such as preferences for levels of light, sound, and temperature.

According to the NASSP task force, styles are hypothetical constructs that help to explain the learning (and teaching) process. They posited that one can recognize the learning style of an individual student by observing his or her behavior. Learning has taken place only when one observes a relatively stable change in learner behavior resulting from what has been experienced.

=== Felder and Silverman's model ===
Richard Felder and Linda Silverman developed their own index for determining learning styles. The Felder Silverman Learning Style Model (FSLSM) is a type of learning styles based on a two-step process, where the individual first receives the information through an internal or external mean and then processes it.

Felder and Silverman discovered five areas that affected learning:

1. Active/Reflective
2. Visual/Verbal
3. Sensing/Intuition
4. Sequential/Global
5. Inductive/Deductive

They placed each of the opposing areas on a spectrum, stating that when students used the entire spectrum, they achieved optimal learning. In 2002, Felder removed the Inductive and Deductive portion because it did not fit the model well given the differences in inductive and deductive teaching methods. Felder and Silverman placed Active, Visual, Sensing, and Sequential on one side of the spectrum and their counterparts on the opposing side.

Felder also noted, however, that while full understanding of the spectrum allows for optimal learning, that mismatches do exist. Specifically, when a professor does not teach to the learning styles of their students, many students tend to lose interest in the class, going as far as changing to other studies or dropping out of school entirely.

== Assessment methods ==
A 2004 non-peer-reviewed literature review criticized most of the main instruments used to identify an individual's learning style. In conducting the review, Frank Coffield and his colleagues selected 13 of the most influential models of the 71 models they identified, including most of the models described in this article. They examined the theoretical origins and terms of each model, and the instrument that purported to assess individuals against the learning styles defined by the model. They analyzed the claims made by the author(s), external studies of these claims, and independent empirical evidence of the relationship between the learning style identified by the instrument and students' actual learning. Coffield's team found that none of the most popular learning style theories had been adequately validated through independent research. This means that even if the underlying theories were sound, educators are frequently unable to correctly identify the theoretically correct learning style for any given student, so the theory would end up being misapplied in practice.

=== Learning Style Inventory ===
The Learning Style Inventory (LSI) is connected with David A. Kolb's model and is used to determine a student's learning style. Previous versions of the LSI have been criticized for problems with validity, reliability, and other issues. Version 4 of the Learning Style Inventory replaces the four learning styles of previous versions with nine new learning styles: initiating, experiencing, imagining, reflecting, analyzing, thinking, deciding, acting, and balancing. The LSI is intended to help employees or students "understand how their learning style impacts upon problem solving, teamwork, handling conflict, communication and career choice; develop more learning flexibility; find out why teams work well—or badly—together; strengthen their overall learning."

A completely different Learning Styles Inventory is associated with a binary division of learning styles, developed by Felder and Silverman. Their model interprets learning styles as a balance between pairs of extremes, and the four scores provided by a questionnaire describes these balances. Like the LSI mentioned above, this inventory provides overviews and synopses for teachers.

=== NASSP Learning Style Profile ===
The NASSP Learning Style Profile (LSP) is a second-generation instrument for the diagnosis of student cognitive styles, perceptual responses, and study and instructional preferences. The LSP is a diagnostic tool intended as the basis for comprehensive style assessment with students in the sixth to twelfth grades. It was developed by the National Association of Secondary School Principals research department in conjunction with a national task force of learning style experts. The Profile was developed in four phases with initial work undertaken at the University of Vermont (cognitive elements), Ohio State University (affective elements), and St. John's University (physiological/environmental elements). Rigid validation and normative studies were conducted using factor analytic methods to ensure strong construct validity and subscale independence.

The LSP contains 23 scales representing four higher order factors: cognitive styles, perceptual responses, study preferences and instructional preferences (the affective and physiological elements). The LSP scales are: analytic skill, spatial skill, discrimination skill, categorizing skill, sequential processing skill, simultaneous processing skill, memory skill, perceptual response: visual, perceptual response: auditory, perceptual response: emotive, persistence orientation, verbal risk orientation, verbal-spatial preference, manipulative preference, study time preference: early morning, study time preference: late morning, study time preference: afternoon, study time preference: evening, grouping preference, posture preference, mobility preference, sound preference, lighting preference, temperature preference.

=== Other methods ===
Other methods (usually questionnaires) used to identify learning styles include Neil Fleming's VARK Questionnaire and Jackson's Learning Styles Profiler. Many other tests have gathered popularity and various levels of credibility among students and teachers.

== In the classroom ==
For a teacher to use the learning styles model, the teacher has to be able to correctly match each student to a learning style. This is a generally unsuccessful exercise due to inappropriate tools. For an assessment tool to be useful, it needs to be a valid test, which is to say that it actually has to put all of the "style A" students in the "A" group, all of the "style B" students in the "B" group, and so forth. Research indicates that very few, if any, of the psychometric tests promoted in conjunction with the learning styles idea have the necessary validity to be useful in practice. Some models, such as Anthony Gregorc's Gregorc Style Delineator, are "theoretically and psychometrically flawed" and "not suitable for the assessment of individuals".

Furthermore, knowing a student's learning style does not seem to have any practical value for the student. In 2019, the American Association of Anatomists published a study that investigated whether learning styles had any effect on the final outcomes of an anatomy course. The study found that even when being told they had a specific learning style, the students did not change their study habits, and those students that did use their theoretically dominant learning style had no greater success in the course; specific study strategies, unrelated to learning style, were positively correlated with final course grade.

=== Dunn and Dunn ===
Various researchers have attempted to hypothesize ways in which learning style theory can be used in the classroom. Two such scholars are Rita Dunn and Kenneth Dunn, who build upon a learning modalities approach.

Although learning styles will inevitably differ among students in the classroom, Dunn and Dunn say that teachers should try to make changes in their classroom that will be beneficial to every learning style. Some of these changes include room redesign, the development of small-group techniques, and the development of "contract activity packages". Redesigning the classroom involves locating dividers that can be used to arrange the room creatively (such as having different learning stations and instructional areas), clearing the floor area, and incorporating students' thoughts and ideas into the design of the classroom.

Dunn and Dunn's "contract activity packages" are educational plans that use: a clear statement of the learning need; multisensory resources (auditory, visual, tactile, kinesthetic); activities through which the newly mastered information can be used creatively; the sharing of creative projects within small groups; at least three small-group techniques; a pre-test, a self-test, and a post-test.

Dunn and Dunn's learning styles model is widely used in schools in the United States, and 177 articles have been published in peer-reviewed journals referring to this model. However, the conclusion of a review by Coffield and colleagues was: "Despite a large and evolving research programme, forceful claims made for impact are questionable because of limitations in many of the supporting studies and the lack of independent research on the model."

=== Sprenger's differentiation ===
Another scholar who believes that learning styles should have an effect on the classroom is Marilee Sprenger in Differentiation through Learning Styles and Memory. She bases her work on three premises:

1. Teachers can be learners, and learners teachers. We are all both.
2. Everyone can learn under the right circumstances.
3. Learning is fun! Make it appealing.

Sprenger details how to teach in visual, auditory, or tactile/kinesthetic ways. Methods for visual learners include ensuring that students can see words written, using pictures, and drawing timelines for events. Methods for auditory learners include repeating words aloud, small-group discussion, debates, listening to books on tape, oral reports, and oral interpretation. Methods for tactile/kinesthetic learners include hands-on activities (experiments, etc.), projects, frequent breaks to allow movement, visual aids, role play, and field trips. By using a variety of teaching methods from each of these categories, teachers cater to different learning styles at once, and improve learning by challenging students to learn in different ways.

James W. Keefe and John M. Jenkins have incorporated learning style assessment as a basic component in their "personalized instruction" model of schooling. Six basic elements constitute the culture and context of personalized instruction. The cultural components—teacher role, student learning characteristics, and collegial relationships—establish the foundation of personalization and ensure that the school prizes a caring and collaborative environment. The contextual factors—interactivity, flexible scheduling, and authentic assessment—establish the structure of personalization.

According to Keefe and Jenkins, cognitive and learning style analysis have a special role in the process of personalizing instruction. The assessment of student learning style, more than any other element except the teacher role, establishes the foundation for a personalized approach to schooling: for student advisement and placement, for appropriate retraining of student cognitive skills, for adaptive instructional strategy, and for the authentic evaluation of learning. Some learners respond best in instructional environments based on an analysis of their perceptual and environmental style preferences: most individualized and personalized teaching methods reflect this point of view. Other learners, however, need help to function successfully in any learning environment. If a youngster cannot cope under conventional instruction, enhancing his cognitive skills may make successful achievement possible.

Many of the student learning problems that learning style diagnosis attempts to solve relate directly to elements of the human information processing system. Processes such as attention, perception and memory, and operations such as integration and retrieval of information are internal to the system. Any hope for improving student learning necessarily involves an understanding and application of information processing theory. Learning style assessment can provide a window to understanding and managing this process.

At least one study evaluating teaching styles and learning styles, however, has found that congruent groups have no significant differences in achievement from incongruent groups. Furthermore, learning style in this study varied by demography, specifically by age, suggesting a change in learning style as one gets older and acquires more experience. While significant age differences did occur, as well as no experimental manipulation of classroom assignment, the findings do call into question the aim of congruent teaching–learning styles in the classroom.

Educational researchers Eileen Carnell and Caroline Lodge concluded that learning styles are not fixed and that they are dependent on circumstance, purpose and conditions.

== In teacher professional development ==
Research about using learning styles as a tool in professional teacher development has shown some positive findings. For example, in the study "Developing Teacher Sensitivity to Individual Learning Differences", teachers changed their language, beliefs and practice, thereby increasing their teacher effectiveness when they learned about themselves as learners with learning styles tools.

== Criticism ==
Learning style theories have been criticized by many scholars and researchers. Some psychologists and neuroscientists have questioned the scientific basis for separating out students based on learning style. According to Susan Greenfield the practice is "nonsense" from a neuroscientific point of view: "Humans have evolved to build a picture of the world through our senses working in unison, exploiting the immense interconnectivity that exists in the brain." Similarly, Christine Harrington argued that since all students are multisensory learners, educators should teach research-based general learning skills.

Since 2012, learning styles have often been referred to as a "neuromyth" in education, which is believed by up to 89% of educators. There is evidence of empirical and pedagogical problems related to forcing learning tasks to "correspond to differences in a one-to-one fashion". Studies contradict the widespread "meshing hypothesis" that a student will learn best if taught in a method deemed appropriate for the student's learning style.

Studies further show that teachers cannot assess the learning style of their students accurately. In one study, students were asked to take an inventory of their learning styles. After nearly 400 students completed the inventory, 70% did not use study habits that matched their preferred learning method. This study also indicated that students who used study methods that matched their preferred learning style performed no better on tests than students who did not.

Many educational psychologists have shown that there is little evidence for the efficacy of most learning style models, and furthermore, that the models often rest on dubious theoretical grounds. According to professor of education Steven Stahl, there has been an "utter failure to find that assessing children's learning styles and matching to instructional methods has any effect on their learning." Professor of education Guy Claxton has questioned the extent that learning styles such as VARK are helpful, particularly as they can have a tendency to label children and therefore restrict learning. Similarly, psychologist Kris Vasquez pointed out a number of problems with learning styles, including the lack of empirical evidence that learning styles are useful in producing student achievement, but also her more serious concern that the use of learning styles in the classroom could lead students to develop self-limiting implicit theories about themselves that could become self-fulfilling prophecies that are harmful, rather than beneficial, to the goal of serving student diversity. Vasquez suggested that teachers may benefit students by mixing multiple presentation techniques (i.e. multiple teaching strategies) in general instead of trying to tailor instruction to individual preferences.

Some research has shown that long-term retention can better be achieved under conditions that seem more difficult, and that teaching students only in their preferred learning style is not effective.

Psychologists Scott Lilienfeld, Barry Beyerstein, and colleagues listed as one of the "50 great myths of popular psychology" the idea that "students learn best when teaching styles are matched to their learning styles", and they summarized some relevant reasons not to believe this "myth".

=== Other critiques ===
Coffield and his colleagues and Mark Smith are not alone in their judgements. In 2005, Demos, a UK think tank, published a report on learning styles prepared by a group chaired by David Hargreaves that included Usha Goswami from the University of Cambridge and David Wood from the University of Nottingham. The Demos report said that the evidence for learning styles was "highly variable", and that practitioners were "not by any means always frank about the evidence for their work".

Cautioning against interpreting neuropsychological research as supporting the applicability of learning style theory, John Geake, Professor of Education at the UK's Oxford Brookes University, and a research collaborator with Oxford University's Centre for Functional Magnetic Resonance Imaging of the Brain, commented in 2005: "We need to take extreme care when moving from the lab to the classroom. We do remember things visually and aurally, but information isn't defined by how it was received."

The work of Daniel T. Willingham, a cognitive psychologist and neuroscientist, has argued that there is not enough evidence to support a theory describing the differences in learning styles amongst students. In his 2009 book Why Don't Students Like School, he claimed that a cognitive styles theory must have three features: "it should consistently attribute to a person the same style, it should show that people with different abilities think and learn differently, and it should show that people with different styles do not, on average, differ in ability". He concluded that there are no theories that have these three crucial characteristics, not necessarily implying that cognitive styles don't exist but rather stating that psychologists have been unable to "find them". In a 2008 self-published YouTube video titled "Learning Styles Don't Exist", Willingham concluded by saying: "Good teaching is good teaching and teachers don't need to adjust their teaching to individual students' learning styles."

=== 2009 APS critique ===
In late 2009, the journal Psychological Science in the Public Interest of the Association for Psychological Science (APS) published a report on the scientific validity of learning styles practices. The panel of experts that wrote the article, led by Harold Pashler of the University of California, San Diego, concluded that an adequate evaluation of the learning styles hypothesis—the idea that optimal learning demands that students receive instruction tailored to their learning styles—requires a particular kind of study. Specifically, students should be grouped into the learning style categories that are being evaluated (e.g., visual learners vs. verbal learners), and then students in each group must be randomly assigned to one of the learning methods (e.g., visual learning or verbal learning), so that some students will be "matched" and others will be "mismatched". At the end of the experiment, all students must sit for the same test. If the learning style hypothesis is correct, then, for example, visual learners should learn better with the visual method, whereas auditory learners should learn better with the auditory method. As disclosed in the report, the panel found that studies utilizing this essential research design were virtually absent from the learning styles literature. In fact, the panel was able to find only a few studies with this research design, and all but one of these studies were negative findings—that is, they found that the same learning method was superior for all kinds of students. Examples of such negative findings include the research of Laura J. Massa and Richard E. Mayer, as well as more recent research since the 2009 review.

Furthermore, the panel noted that, even if the requisite finding were obtained, the benefits would need to be large, and not just statistically significant, before learning style interventions could be recommended as cost-effective. That is, the cost of evaluating and classifying students by their learning style, and then providing customized instruction would need to be more beneficial than other interventions (e.g., one-on-one tutoring, after school remediation programs, etc.).

As a consequence, the panel concluded, "at present, there is no adequate evidence base to justify incorporating learning styles assessments into general educational practice. Thus, limited education resources would better be devoted to adopting other educational practices that have strong evidence base, of which there are an increasing number."

The article incited critical comments from some defenders of learning styles. The Chronicle of Higher Education reported that Robert Sternberg from Tufts University spoke out against the paper: "Several of the most-cited researchers on learning styles, Mr. Sternberg points out, do not appear in the paper's bibliography." This charge was also discussed by Science, which reported that Pashler said, "Just so... most of [the evidence] is 'weak'." The Chronicle reported that even David A. Kolb partly agreed with Pashler; Kolb said: "The paper correctly mentions the practical and ethical problems of sorting people into groups and labeling them. Tracking in education has a bad history."

=== Subsequent critiques ===
A 2013 study pointed out that Kolb's Learning Style Inventory, among its other weaknesses, incorrectly dichotomizes individuals on the abstract/concrete and reflective/action dimensions of experiential learning (in much the same way as the Myers-Briggs Type Indicator does in a different context), and proposed instead that these dimensions be treated as continuous rather than dichotomous/binary variables.

In an article that addressed Kolb's work through 2005, Mark K. Smith reviewed some critiques of Kolb's model, and identified six key issues regarding the model:

1. The model doesn't adequately address the process of reflection;
2. The claims it makes about the four learning styles are extravagant;
3. It doesn't sufficiently address the fact of different cultural conditions and experiences;
4. The idea of stages/steps doesn't necessarily match reality;
5. It has only weak empirical evidence;
6. The relationship between learning processes and knowledge is more complex than Kolb draws it.

A 2015 review paper examined the studies of learning styles completed after the 2009 APS critique, giving particular attention to studies that used the experimental methods advocated for by Pashler et al. The findings were similar to those of the APS critique: the evidence for learning styles was virtually nonexistent while evidence contradicting it was both more prevalent and used more sound methodology. Follow-up studies concluded that learning styles had no effect on student retention of material whereas another explanation, dual coding, had a substantial impact on it and held more potential for practical application in the classroom.

A 2017 research paper from the UK found that 90% of academics agreed there are "basic conceptual flaws" with learning styles theory, yet 58% agreed that students "learn better when they receive information in their preferred learning style", and 33% reported that they used learning styles as a method in the past year. It concluded that it might be better to use methods that are "demonstrably effective".

A 2025 meta-analysis explored the distinction between learning styles and learning strategies, concluding that we should not perpetuate the myths and unsupported claims about learning styles. Instead, educators should focus more on learning strategies that "can foster a more robust and flexible learning environment by emphasizing critical thinking, self-regulation, and meaningful engagement with content".

== See also ==
- Barnum effect – Tendency to interpret vague statements as meaningful ones
- Career and technical education
- Constructivism (philosophy of education) – Theory of knowledge
- Memory improvement – Act of improving one's memory
- Meta learning – Aspect of metacognition
- Metacognition – Self-awareness about thinking, higher-order thinking skills
- Montessori education – Teaching method encouraging autodidacticism
- Multisensory learning – Learning with the use of more than one sense
- Personality test – Method of assessing human personality constructs
  - 16PF Questionnaire – Self-report personality test
  - Big Five personality traits – Personality model consisting of five broad dimensions
  - DISC assessment – Leadership assessment tool
- Speed learning – Set of techniques intended to increase learning rate
- Theory of multiple intelligences – Educational model of human intelligence
- Working memory – Cognitive system for temporarily holding information
