= Anthony Gregorc =

Anthony F. Gregorc
- Education: Miami University (Ohio), Kent State University (Ohio).
- Known for: Mind Styles Model
- Scientific career
- Fields: Phenomenology
- Workplaces: Gregorc Associates Inc.

Anthony F. Gregorc is an American who has taught educational administration. He is best known for his disputed theory of the Mind Styles Model and its associated Style Delineator. The model tries to match education to particular learning styles, as identified by Gregorc.

== Career ==
Gregorc obtained a B.S. degree from Miami University and an M.S. degree and a Ph.D. degree from Kent State University. He has taught mathematics and biology and has been the principal of a laboratory school for gifted youth. He was an associate professor of education administration at the University of Illinois at Urbana-Champaign and an associate professor of curriculum and instruction at the University of Connecticut. He is president of Gregorc Associates, Inc., in Columbia, Connecticut.

== Mind Styles Model and Gregorc Style Delineator (GSD) ==
The Gregorc Style Delineator is a self-scoring written instrument that elicits responses to a set of 40 specific words. Scoring the responses will give values for a model with two axes: a "perceptual space duality," concrete vs. abstract, and an "ordering duality," sequential vs. random The resulting quadrants are the "styles":

- Concrete Sequential
- Concrete Random
- Abstract Sequential
- Abstract Random

Descriptions of the characteristics of these styles can be found in the materials available from Gregorc Associates.

A similarly structured (two-axis, four-style) learning style model with rather different axes and interpretation can be seen in the Kolb LSI.

=== Supporting evidence ===
The design, conduct, and results of Gregorc's original testing of the validity of his instrument and model are presented in his Development, Technical, and Administration Manual, self-published and sold by Gregorc Associates. Some peer review has since appeared in conventional channels:

With the exception of Joniak and Isakson (1988) and O'Brien (1990), the only other psychometric analysis of the GSD has been limited to Gregorc's (1979) initial assessments made during the instrument's early development in which Gregorc interviewed several hundred participants. He compared the agreement of GSD scores with an untested self-assessment scale to establish the instrument's face validity for each individual (i.e., the instrument's results versus an individual's subjective agreement that their learning style profile tends to fit them). The correlations of the instrument's general results and the subjectively rated agreement attributes were reported to be between .55 and .76. This problematic method was adopted again in a subsequent comparative analysis by the author (Gregorc, 1982c) and also yielded what Gregorc considered positive results--29% strongly agreeing, 57% agreeing, 14% unsure, and none disagreeing.

==== Review of Gregorc's study ====
Timothy Sewall, in a comparison of four learning style assessments (Gregorc's, Myers Briggs, Kolb LSI, and an LSI by Canfield) by review of their published supporting studies (i.e., without new experimental work) concluded of Gregorc's design, "the most appropriate use of this instrument would be to provide an example of how not to construct [an] assessment tool."

==== Studies by others ====
Reio and Wiswell (2006) report on their own independent study and on those done earlier by O'Brien (1990) and Joniak and Isakson (1988).

===== Reliability =====
Internal consistency or reliability concerns whether evidence can show that an instrument is repeatably measuring something (which may be, but is "not necessarily what it is supposed to be measuring").

Gregorc (1982c) reported test-retest correlation coefficients of .85 to .88 (measured twice with intervals ranging from 6 hours to 8 weeks) and alpha coefficients of .89 to .93 on all four scales. In this study, the Cronbach's alpha coefficients on all scales or channels ranged from .54 to .68 (CS = .64, CR = .68, AR = .58, AS = .54). This study's alpha coefficients are consistent with those reported by O'Brien (1990) and Joniak and Isakson (1988), which ranged from .51 to .64 and .23 to .66, respectively, on all scales.

For internal consistency reliability estimates, although an alpha level of .70 can be considered "adequate," for the purposes of this study we considered a stricter alpha level of .80 as a "good" cutoff value for our psychometric examination of the GSD (Henson, 2001).

===== Construct validity =====
Construct validity concerns whether evidence can show that what the instrument is measuring is at all what the offered theory claims it is (whether each construct in the model "adequately represents what is intended by theoretical account of the construct being measured").

The data disconfirmed both the two- and four-factor confirmatory models. In the post hoc exploratory factor analyses, many of the factor pattern/structure coefficients were ambiguously associated with two or more of the four theoretical channels as well. Overall, there was little support for the GSD's theoretical basis or design and the concomitant accurate portrayal of one's cognitive learning style.

[F]ar more work is needed on the GSD if indeed two bipolar dimensions and Gregorc's mediational or channel theory are to be empirically supported and if it is to be appropriately used with samples of adults.

Consistent with Joniak and Isaksen (1988) and O'Brien (1990), the GSD did not display sufficient empirical evidence to validate the instrument's scores or to confirm Gregorc's theoretical interpretation of four learning style channels or two bipolar dimensions.

=== Supporting evidence, learning style models generally ===
A report from the UK think-tank Demos reported that the evidence for a variety of learning style models is "highly variable", that "authors are not by any means always frank about the evidence for their work, and secondary sources ... may ignore the question of evidence altogether, leaving the impression that there is no problem here."

== Major works ==
- Gregorc Style Delineator - A psychometric test
- An Adult's Guide to Style, Gabriel Systems, Maynard (1982).
- Mind Styles FAQs Book
- The Mind Styles Model: Theory, Principles and Practice

== See also ==
- Learning styles
