= Neil Fleming =

New Zealand educationalist

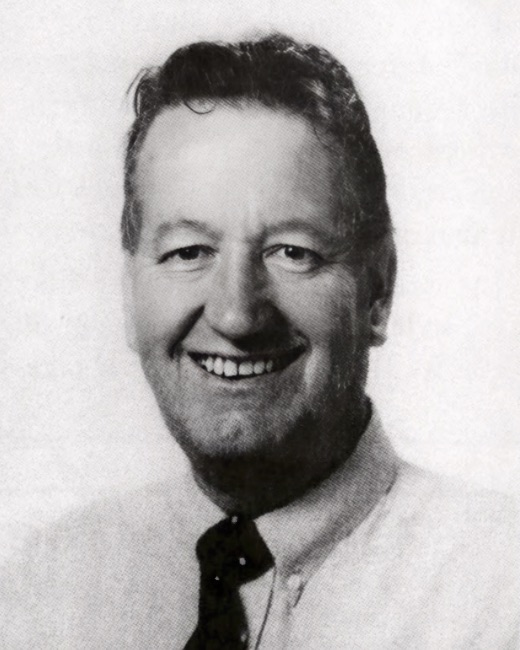
Fleming, c. 1994

Neil Donald Fleming (19 October 1939 – 16 June 2022) was a New Zealand educationalist. He taught in universities, teacher education centres and high schools.

== Biography ==
Fleming was born on 19 October 1939, and graduated with a Bachelor of Arts degree from the University of Canterbury in 1962. Before working for eleven years in faculty development at Lincoln University, he was for nine years a senior inspector for the over 100 high schools in the South Island of New Zealand. This involved being a critical observer of over 9000 'lessons' in classrooms.

Fleming died in Christchurch on 16 June 2022, at the age of 82 years.

== Learning styles: VARK Model ==
Fleming is best known worldwide for the design of the VARK model. which expanded upon earlier Neuro-linguistic programming (NLP) models. His VARK model was launched in 1987 through work done at Lincoln University. Prior to Fleming's work, VAK was in common usage. Fleming split the Visual dimension (the V in VAK) into two parts—symbolic as Visual (V) and text as Read/write (R). This created a fourth mode, Read/write and brought about the word VARK for a new concept, a learning-preferences approach, a questionnaire and support materials.

Fleming came up with the idea for the VARK model while working as an inspector for the New Zealand education system; he noticed that some great teachers were not reaching some students while other poor teachers were. When he moved to Lincoln University he decided to investigate why this was. He created the VARK test based on prior experience and by working with students and teachers at Lincoln University.

Despite the popularity of learning styles and inventories such as the VARK, there is no evidence to support the idea that matching activities to one’s learning style improves learning. In 2009, Psychological Science in the Public Interest commissioned cognitive psychologists Harold Pashler, Mark McDaniel, Doug Rohrer, and Robert Bjork to evaluate the research on learning styles to determine whether there is credible evidence to support using learning styles in instruction. Their conclusion was: “Although the literature on learning styles is enormous,” they “found virtually no evidence” supporting the idea that “instruction is best provided in a format that matches the preference of the learner.” Many of those studies suffered from weak research design, rendering them far from convincing. Others with an effective experimental design “found results that flatly contradict the popular” assumptions about learning styles. In sum, “The contrast between the enormous popularity of the learning-styles approach within education and the lack of credible evidence for its utility is, in our opinion, striking and disturbing”.
