= Visual learning =

Learning style

Visual learning is one of the learning styles in which information is primarily received and understood by a learner when presented in a visual format. Visual learners can utilize graphs, charts, maps, diagrams, and other forms of visual stimulation to effectively interpret information. It is best to treat a learning style as a matter of individual preference, rather than an educational need. Students generally learn best from mixed modality presentations, such as combining a spoken lecture (using an auditory learning style) with a visual aid (using a visual learning style).

Visual learning is included in Neil Fleming's DIVANO model and the Fleming VARK mode.

== Techniques ==
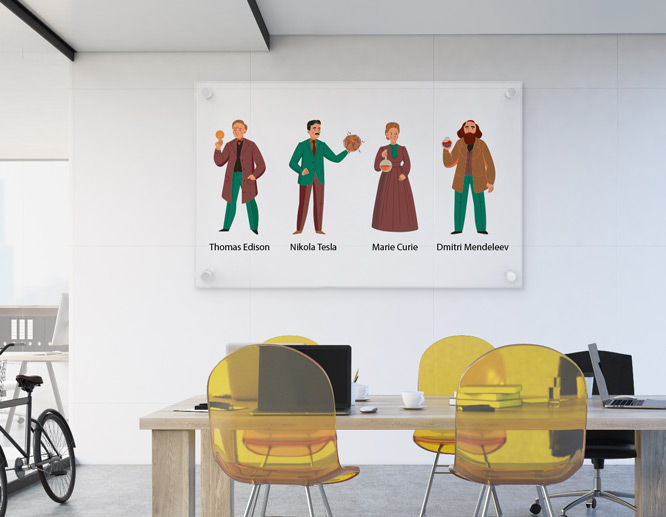
Famous people showing their inventions

A review study concluded that using graphic organizers improves student performance in the following areas:

Retention
Students remember information better and can better recall it when it is represented and learned both visually and verbally.

Reading comprehension
The use of graphic organizers helps improve reading comprehension of students.

Student achievement
Students with and without learning disabilities improve performance across content areas and grade levels.

Thinking and learning skills; critical thinking
When students develop and use a graphic organizer their higher order thinking and critical thinking skills are enhanced.

== Areas of the brain affected ==
Various areas of the brain work together in many ways to produce the images that we see with our eyes and encoded by our brains. The basis of this work takes place in the visual cortex of the brain. The visual cortex is located in the occipital lobe of the brain and harbors many other structures that aid in visual recognition, categorization, and learning. One of the first things the brain must do when acquiring new visual information is to recognize it. Brain areas involved in recognition are the inferior temporal cortex, the superior parietal cortex, and the cerebellum. During recognition tasks, activation increases in the left inferior temporal cortex, and decreases in the right superior parietal cortex. Recognition is aided by neural plasticity, or the brain's ability to reshape itself based on new information. Next the brain must categorize the material using the three main areas that are used when categorizing new visual information: the orbitofrontal cortex and two dorsolateral prefrontal regions which begin the process of sorting new information into groups and further assimilating that information into things that you might already know.

After recognizing and categorizing new material entered into the visual field, the brain is ready to begin the encoding process – the process that leads to learning. Multiple brain areas are involved in this process such as the frontal lobe, the right extrastriate cortex, the neocortex, and again, the neostriatum. One area in particular, the limbic-diencephalic region, is essential for transforming perceptions into memories. With the coming together of tasks of recognition, categorization, and learning; schemas help make the process of encoding new information and relating it to things you already know much easier. One can remember visual images much better when applying them to an already-known schema. Schemas provide enhancement of visual memory and learning.

== Infancy ==
=== Where it starts ===
Between the fetal stage and 18 months, a baby experiences rapid growth of a substance called gray matter. Gray matter is the darker tissue of the brain and spinal cord, consisting mainly of nerve cell bodies and branching dendrites. It is responsible for processing sensory information in the brain such as areas like the primary visual cortex. The primary visual cortex is located within the occipital lobe in the back of infant's brain and is responsible for processing visual information such as static or moving objects and pattern recognition.

=== The four pathways ===
Within the primary visual cortex, there are four pathways: the superior colliculus pathway (SC pathway), the middle temporal area pathway (MT pathway), the frontal eye fields pathway (FEF pathway), and the inhibitory pathway. Each pathway is crucial to the development of visual attention in the first few months of life.

The SC pathway is responsible for the generation of eye movements toward simple stimuli. It receives information from the retina and the visual cortex and can direct behavior toward an object. The MT pathway is involved in the smooth tracking of objects and travels between the SC pathway and the primary visual cortex. In conjunction with the SC pathway and the MT pathway, the FEF pathway allows the infant to control eye movements as well as visual attention. It also plays a part in sensory processing in the infant.

Lastly, the inhibitory pathway regulates the activity in the superior colliculus and is later responsible for obligatory attention in the infant. The maturation and functionality of these pathways depends on how well the infant can make distinctions as well as focus on stimuli.

=== Supporting studies ===
A study by Haith, Hazan, & Goodman in 1988 showed that babies as young as 3.5 months are able to create short-term expectations of situations they confront. Expectations in this study refer to the cognitive and perceptual ways in which an infant can forecast a future event. This was tested by showing the infant either a predictable pattern of slides or an irregular pattern of slides and tracking the infant's eye movements.

A later study by Johnson, Posner, & Rothbart in 1991 showed that by 4 months, infants can develop expectations. This was tested through anticipatory looks and disengagement with stimuli. For example, anticipatory looks portray the infant as being able to predict the next part of a pattern which can then be applied to the real world scenario of breast-feeding. Infants are able to predict a mother's movements and expect feeding so they can latch onto the nipple for feeding. Expectations, anticipatory looks, and disengagement all show that infants can learn visually, even if it is only short term.

David Roberts (2016) tested multimedia learning propositions, he found that using certain images dislocates pedagogically harmful excesses of text, reducing cognitive overloading and exploiting under-used visual processing capacities

== In early childhood ==
From the ages 3–8, visual learning improves and begins to take many different forms. At the toddler age of 3–5, children's bodily actions structure the visual learning environment. At this age, toddlers are using their newly developed sensory-motor skills quite often and fusing them with their improved vision to understand the world around them. This is seen by toddlers using their arms to bring objects of interest close to their sensors, such as their eyes and faces, to explore the object further. The act of bringing objects close to their face affects their immediate view by placing their mental and visual attention on that object and just blocking the view of other objects that are around them and out of view.

There is an emphasis placed on objects and things that are directly in front of them and thus proximal vision is the primary perspective of visual learning. This is different from how adults utilize visual learning. This difference in toddler vision and adult vision is attributable to their body sizes, and body movements such that their visual experiences are created by their body movement. An adult's view is broad due to their larger body size, with most objects in view because of the distance between them and objects. Adults tend to scan a room, and see everything rather than focusing on one object only.

The way a child integrates visual learning with motor experiences enhances their perceptual and cognitive development. For elementary school children aged 4–11, intellect is positively related to their level of auditory-visual integrative proficiency. The most significant period for the development of auditory-visual integration occurs between ages 5–7. During this time, the child has mastered visual-kinesthetic integration, and the child's visual learning can be applied to formal learning focused towards books and reading, rather than physical objects, thus impacting their intellect. As reading scores increase, children are able to learn more, and their visual learning has developed to not only focus on physical objects in close proximity to them, but also to interpret words and as such acquire knowledge by reading.

== In middle childhood ==
Here we categorize middle childhood as ages 9 to 14. By this stage in a child's normal development, vision is sharp and learning processes are well underway. Most studies that have focused their efforts on visual learning have found that visual learning styles as opposed to traditional learning styles greatly improve the totality of a student's learning experience. Firstly, visual learning engages students, note that student engagement is one of the most important factors that motivate students to learn. Visuals increase student interest with the use of graphics animation and video. Consequently, it has been found that students pay greater attention to lecture material when visuals are used. With increased attention to lesson material, many positive outcomes have been seen with the use of visual tactics in the classrooms of middle-aged students.

Students organize and process information more thoroughly when they learn visually which helps them to understand the information better and they are more likely to remember information that is learned with a visual aid. Research shows that when teachers used visual tactics to teach middle-aged students they found that students had more positive attitudes about the material they were learning. Students also exemplified higher test performance, higher standard achievement scores, thinking on levels that require higher-order thinking, and more engagement. One study also found that learning about emotional events, such as the Holocaust, with visual aids increase middle- aged children's empathy.

== In adolescence ==
=== Brain maturation into young adulthood ===
Gray matter is responsible for generating nerve impulses that process brain information, and white matter is responsible for transmitting that brain information between lobes and out through the spinal cord. Nerve impulses are transmitted by myelin, a fatty material that grows around a cell. White matter has a myelin sheath (a collection of myelin) while gray matter does not which efficiently allows neural impulses to move swiftly along the fiber. The myelin sheath isn't fully formed until around ages 24–26. This means that adolescents and young adults typically learn differently, and subsequently often utilize visual aids in order to help them better comprehend difficult subjects.

Learning preferences can vary across a wide spectrum. Specifically, within the realm of visual learning, they can vary between people who prefer being given learning instructions with text as opposed to those who prefer graphics. College students were tested in general factors like learning preference and spatial ability (being able to be proficient in creating, holding, and manipulating spatial representations). The study determined that college-age individuals report efficient learning styles and learning preferences for themselves individually. These personal assessments have proved accurate, meaning that self-ratings of factors such as spatial ability and learning preference can be effective measures of how well one learns visually.

=== Gender differences ===
Studies have indicated that adolescents learn best through 10 various styles: reading, manipulative activity, teacher explanation, auditory stimulation, visual demonstration, visual stimulation (electronic), visual stimulation (just pictures), games, social interaction, and personal experience. According to the study, young adult males demonstrate a preference for learning through activities they are able to manipulate while young adult females show a greater preference for learning through teacher notes visually or by using graphs, and through reading. This suggests that men are more visually stimulated, interested in information that they can have physical direct control over. Women, on the other hand, learn best through reading information and having it explained by spoken word.

== Evidence for and against ==
Although learning styles have "enormous popularity", educational psychologists regard them as urban legends. While both children and adults express personal preferences, there is no evidence that identifying a student's learning style produces better outcomes. There is significant evidence against the widely touted "meshing hypothesis" (that a student will learn best if taught in a method deemed appropriate for that student's learning style). Well-designed studies "flatly contradict the popular meshing hypothesis", and some suggest that students perform better when not taught with their preferred learning style. Rather than targeting instruction to the right learning style, students appear to benefit most from mixed modality presentations, for instance using both auditory and visual techniques for all students.

The Picture Superiority Effect refers to the obverved phenomenon that pictures and images are more likely to be remembered than words. This is evidence that visual information can aid memorization and learning.

== See also ==
- Learning styles
  - Auditory learning
  - Kinesthetic learning
- Filmstrip
- Slide show
