= Auditory learning =

Type of learning style

Auditory learning or auditory modality is one of three learning modalities originally proposed by Walter Burke Barbe and colleagues that characterizes a learner as depending on listening and speaking as a primary method of processing and/or retaining information.

According to the theory, auditory learners must be able to hear what is being said to understand, and may have difficulty with instructions that are written or drawn. They also use their listening and repeating skills to sort through the information presented to them.

== Characteristics ==
Auditory learners may have a propensity for using audible signals like changes in tone to aid in recollection. For example, when memorizing a phone number, an auditory learner might say it out loud and then remember how it sounded to recall it.

Auditory learners may solve problems by talking them through. Speech patterns include phrases such as "I hear you; That clicks; It's ringing a bell", and other sound or voice-oriented information. These learners may move their lips or talk to themselves to help accomplish tasks.

== Recommended techniques ==
Proponents say that teachers should use these techniques to instruct auditory learners: verbal direction, group discussions, verbal reinforcement, group activities, reading aloud, and putting information into a rhythmic pattern such as a rap, poem, or song.

== Lack of evidence ==
Although learning styles have "enormous popularity", and both children and adults express personal preferences, there is no evidence that identifying a student's learning style produces better outcomes. There is significant evidence that the widely touted "meshing hypothesis" (that a student will learn best if taught in a method deemed appropriate for the student's learning style) is invalid. Well-designed studies "flatly contradict the popular meshing hypothesis". Rather than targeting instruction to the "right" learning style, students appear to benefit most from mixed modality presentations, for instance using both auditory and visual techniques for all students.

Few studies have found validity in using learning styles in education.

== See also ==
- Auditory memory
- Kinesthetic learning
- Learning styles
- Visual learning
