= Kinesthetic learning =

Learning by physical activities

Kinesthetic learning (American English), kinaesthetic learning (British English), or tactile learning is learning that involves physical activity. As cited by Favre (2009), Thomas Alva Edi Sound defines kinesthetic learners as students who prefer whole-body movement to process new and difficult information. However, scientific studies do not support the claim that using kinesthetic modality improves learning in students who identified kinesthetic learning as their preferred learning style.

== History ==
Kinesthetic intelligence, which was originally coupled with tactile abilities, was defined and discussed in Howard Gardner's Frames Of Mind: The Theory of Multiple Intelligences in 1983. In this book, Gardner describes activities such as dancing and performing surgeries as requiring great kinesthetic intelligence: using the body to create (or do) something.

Margaret H'Doubler wrote and spoke about kinesthetic learning during the 1940s, defining kinesthetic learning as the human body's ability to express itself through movement and dance.

Viktor Lowenfeld used the term in his textbook for art educators, Creative and Mental Growth.

== The VARK model ==
Neil Fleming, a New Zealand teacher and educational theorist, designed the VARK model (visual, aural or auditory, read/write and kinesthetic). According to Fleming's model, kinesthetic learners are similar to tactile learners in that they like hands-on experiential learning. They excel in concrete learning such as on-the-job training, work experience, internships, simulations and so forth (Kte'pi, 2016).

The Fleming VAK/VARK model (one of the most common and widely used categorizations of the various types of learning styles) categorized learning styles as follows:

- Hands-on learning
- Visual learning
- Auditory learning
- Read/write learning
- Kinesthetic learning

Skill memory also fits into the category of kinesthetic learning, as it is what happens when somebody is learning kinesthetically. Skill memories are difficult to convey except by direct demonstration, may be acquired without awareness, and require several repetitions.

== Classification ==
Rita Dunn contends that kinesthetic and tactile learning are the same style. Galeet BenZion asserts that kinesthetic and tactile learning are separate learning styles, with different characteristics. She defined kinesthetic learning as the process that results in new knowledge (or understanding) with the involvement of the learner's body movement. This movement is performed to establish new knowledge or extend existing knowledge. Kinesthetic learning is at its best, BenZion found, when the learner uses language (their own words) in order to define, explain, resolve and sort out how their body's movement reflects the concept explored. One example is a student using movement to work out the sum of 1/2 plus 3/4 via movement, then explaining how their motions in space reflect the mathematical process leading to the correct answer.

In addition, Denig (2004) in his article 'Multiple Intelligences and Learning Styles: Two Complementary Dimensions', presented Dunn and Dunn's Learning Styles Model, which addresses 21 elements that affect students' learning. These elements are broken down into five stimuli: environmental, emotional, sociological, physiological and psychological variables. Under this model, physiological stimuli consist of four elements, one of which is perceptual. Perceptual depicts the auditory, visual, tactual and kinesthetic styles whereby learners learn more effectively. This gives meaning to the concept that kinesthetic learners learn best through whole-body activities and experiences while tactual learners learn best through manipulation of items with their hands.

Tactile learning utilizes students' sense of touch to explore and understand their surroundings, emphasizing sensory experiences for cognitive growth, allowing direct interaction and manipulation.

== Kinesthetic memory ==
Depending upon memory systems the kinesthetic learners respond differently. The different kinds of learners mainly include whole body learners, hands-on learners, doodlers, students learning through emotional experiences. The learning and the memory is generally short term. To achieve a long-term memory different techniques can be used depending on the learning style. Mind mapping, story mapping, webbing, drawing can be used to enhance the learning of a doodler. For the hands-on learner, role play, clay, building and math manipulative can be used. The whole body learner can learn better through role-playing, body mapping, puzzles and use of computer technology which allows for certain movement while learning. Students can be engaged in group activities and activities which involve bodily movement such as dance, drama, sports can be used to nurture their learning. The following strategies can be used to facilitate kinesthetic memory through procedural motor pathway such as:

- Dance: ideas, concepts and processes can be expressed through creative movements
- Laboratory demonstrations
- Sports
- Gymnastics
- Charades

The kinesthetic learners who have memories associated with emotions learning can be facilitated through dance, debate, drama, role-play, and charades. This kind of learning leads to a long-term memory since it is associated with emotions such as excitement, curiosity, anger, disappointment and success.

== Types of Skill Memory Utilized ==
Perceptual-motor skills are skills learned by movement patterns guided by sensory inputs. There are closed skills and open skills. Closed skills are skills learned such as dance. A ballerina learns a specific set of moves and doesn't stray from the exact routine, which is why it is called a closed skill; there is one option. Open skills are skills that require more flexibility in learning such as team sports. A person learning how to play football learns multiple drills, strategies, and practices scrimmages in order to learn how to work in multiple types of environments. Because no football game is the same, and a person can't know going into a game the exact steps the other team is going to take, open skills are required to become successful. Cognitive skills also are a part of kinesthetic learning, perceptual learning, and skill memories. Some people learn better in an environment that is more hands-on, and this builds their cognitive skills as well. Cognitive skills are skills which require individuals to solve problems or apply strategies rather than to move their bodies based on what they perceive. Solving a puzzle would be an example of a cognitive skill.

== Management strategies ==
Learners with kinesthetic preferences believe that they learn through active movements and experiences. Activities such as playing, puppetry, drama, acting and designing ensures involvement of the learners.

Some strategies that purportedly motivate students who prefer this learning involve unmotivated students during activities:

- Motivate the students by giving attention and reward, avoid punishment.
- Students should be provided with option to choose activities for learning a particular concept
- Grades can be allotted depending on the participation by using score rubrics
- Activities chosen should encourage all the students to succeed and feel that have accomplished learning through an activity
- Every student has to be given equal opportunity to participate
- Cooperative activities can be organized and positive feedback can be given to encourage the participants teamwork in a class

Some strategies are claimed to be effective in managing hyper motivated students are:

- Encourage the students to organize body movement during activities
- Regular monitoring of the students
- Appropriate and accurate directions have to be given for any activity
- Before involving the students in the activity, the consequences of the task going out of control has to be clearly explained.

== Kinesthetic learners in the classroom ==
Subjects can be taught to cater for kinesthetic learners. Through a strength-based and learner-centered approach, educators should engage kinesthetic students in activities that require movements because they learn by doing. Activities could include role-plays, drama, dance, races and competitions, field trips and projects.

Favre (2009) stated that instructional strategies should include movement in a game-like format. Favre suggested designing kinesthetic games. For example, "game boards such as Tic-Tac-Toe affixed to the classroom floor and hopscotch template painted on the playground tarmac or sidewalks around the school" (p. 32). Favre also suggested that instructors can use "commercial games such as Twister, Jeopardy and Nerf basketball and create game cards that align with their lesson objectives" (pp. 32–33).

Reese & Dunn (2007) in their research of college freshmen learning styles provided recommended that "to ensure success for kinesthetic learners, classes should provide active experiences for planning or carrying out objectives, such as visits, project, role playing, simulations and floor or wall games" (p. 108).

Dena Lister highlights the improvements that were found in classroom performance of sixth-grade learning-support students. Lister writes, "The LSS students also produced significantly the first Learning-Style treatment, suggesting that this particular Learning-Style instructional approach, rather than Traditional teaching, was a more effective instructional strategy for these students."

AJ Richards points out it can be very helpful for physics instructors to develop and employ pedagogical techniques that help students to visualize and to reason productively about these concepts. A particularly effective strategy uses kinesthetic learning activities.

== Signs of a kinesthetic learner ==
Skylar Anderson points out signs that may lead one to believing they are a kinesthetic learner. For example, in his work he states the following signs: your knee is bouncing constantly. You regularly kick a soccer ball, or toss a baseball, or spin a basketball on your finger while having a conversation. You crack your fingers while preparing for, or doing, an activity. You talk using your hands as a complement to your speech. You pace when you really need to cram information for a test. You mime things to boost your memory. You have gotten in trouble more than twice for tapping your pencil on your desk or clicking your pen in the same class period. You think best when you're exercising. You remember your notes best when you've written them down with your hand rather than typing them out. You touch everything you pass in a store without thinking about it.

== Brain substrates involved ==
There are three parts of the brain that are the most important to kinesthetic and skill learning. The basal ganglia, cerebral cortex, and the cerebellum all play equally important roles in the ability to learn new skills and master them.

The basal ganglia are a collection of ganglia (clusters of neurons) that lie at the base of the forebrain. The basal ganglia receive information from other parts of the brain such as the hippocampus and cortical areas that send messages about the outside world. Most of these messages are sensory, meaning what a person is physically feeling. The basal ganglia then interpret this information and sends it on a path to the thalamus and the brain stem which both play large factors in physical movement. Therefore, the basal ganglia are the beginning of the process for somebody who is learning-by-doing to respond viscerally to the stimuli around them. It is important once a skill is learned to practice it. This can change how basal ganglia circuits participate in the performance of that skill and that synaptic plasticity is a basic neural mechanism enabling such changes. The more a person practices, the more plasticity they develop.

The cerebral cortex is the brain tissue covering the top and sides of the brain in most vertebrates. It is involved in storing and processing of sensory inputs and motor outputs. In the human brain, the cerebral cortex is actually a sheet of neural tissue about 1/8th inch thick. The sheet is folded so that it can fit inside the skull. The neural circuits in this area of the brain expand with practice of an activity, just like the synaptic plasticity grows with practice. Clarification of some of the mechanisms of learning by neuroscience has been advanced, in part, by the advent of non-invasive imaging technologies, such as positron emission tomography (PET) and functional magnetic resonance imaging (FMRI). These technologies have allowed researchers to observe human learning processes directly. Through these types of technologies, we are now able to see and study what happens in the process of learning. In different tests performed the brain being imaged showed a greater blood flow and activation to that area of the brain being stimulated through different activities such as finger tapping in a specific sequence. It has been revealed that the process at the beginning of learning a new skill happens quickly, and later on slows down to almost a plateau. This process can also be referred to as The Law of Learning. The slower learning showed in the FMRI that in the cerebral cortex this was when the long term learning was occurring, suggesting that the structural changes in the cortex reflect the enhancement of skill memories during later stages of training. When a person studies a skill for a longer duration of time, but in a shorter amount of time they will learn quickly, but also only retain the information into their short-term memory. Just like studying for an exam; if a student tries to learn everything the night before, it will not stick in the long run. If a person studies a skill for a shorter duration of time, but more frequently and long-term, their brain will retain this information much longer as it is stored in the long-term memory. Functional and structural studies of the brain have revealed a vast interconnectivity between diverse regions of the cerebral cortex. For example, large numbers of axons interconnect the posterior sensory areas serving vision, audition, and touch with anterior motor regions. Constant communication between sensation and movement makes sense, because to execute smooth movement through the environment, movement must be continuously integrated with knowledge about one's surroundings obtained via sensory perception. The cerebral cortex plays a role in allowing humans to do this.

The cerebellum is critical to the ability for a human or animal to be able to regulate movement. This area of the brain wraps around the brain stem and is very densely packed with neurons and neural connections. This part of the brain is involved in timing as well as movement. It assists in predicting events, especially in the formation, execution, and timing of conditioned responses. The cerebellum plays a very important role in all forms of kinesthetic learning and motor function. For a ballerina, it is important to be able to control their movements and time it exactly right for their routine. For a football player it is important to be able to regulate movement when running throwing, and being able to have control over where the ball goes as well as the timing of it.

And all three of these important systems in the brain function together as a team, one not being more important than the other. They work together to allow for responding to sensory events, timing, controlling physical actions, and more. However, it is important to remember that unless a person is actively practicing, these parts of the brain won't help them get to their full potential. Alterations in the brain that occur during learning seem to make the nerve cells more efficient or powerful. Studies have shown that animals raised in complex environments have a greater volume of capillaries per nerve cell—and therefore a greater supply of blood to the brain—than the caged animals, regardless of whether the caged animal lived alone or with companions. Overall, these studies depict an orchestrated pattern of increased capacity in the brain that depends on experience.

== See also ==
- Brain training programs
