= David A. Kolb =

American educational theorist (born 1939)

David Allen Kolb
- Born: December 12, 1939 (age 86)

Philosophical work
- Era: 20th-century philosophy
- Region: Western Philosophy
- Main interests: experiential learning
- Notable ideas: Experiential Learning Model (ELM)

David Allen Kolb (born December 12, 1939, in Moline, Illinois) is an American educational theorist whose interests and publications focus on experiential learning, the individual and social change, career development, and executive and professional education. He is the founder and chairman of Experience Based Learning Systems, LLC (EBLS), and an Emeritus Professor of Organizational Behavior in the Weatherhead School of Management, Case Western Reserve University, Cleveland, Ohio. Kolb has collaborated with his daughter Alice on research related to experiential learning and has co-authored several works with her.

Kolb earned his BA from Knox College in 1961 and his MA and Ph.D. from Harvard University in 1964 and 1967 respectively, in social psychology.

== Experiential learning ==
In the early 1970s, Kolb and Ron Fry (now both at the Weatherhead School of Management) developed the Experiential Learning Model (ELM), composed of four elements:

- concrete experience,
- observation of and reflection on that experience,
- formation of abstract concepts based upon the reflection,
- testing the new concepts,
- (repeat).

These four elements are the essence of a spiral of learning that can begin with any one of the four elements, but typically begins with a concrete experience.

While this model is used widely in fields such as management education, it has been criticised for its inflexibility and over-simplification.

== Learning Style Inventory ==
Kolb is known in educational circles for his Learning Style Inventory (LSI). His model is built upon the idea that learning preferences can be described using two continuums:

- Active experimentation ↔ Reflective observation
- Abstract conceptualization ↔ Concrete experience.

The result is four types of learners: converger (Active experimentation - Abstract conceptualization), accommodator (Active experimentation - Concrete experience), assimilator (Reflective observation - Abstract conceptualization), and diverger (Reflective observation - Concrete experience). The LSI is designed to determine an individual's learning preference.

== Bibliography ==
- Kolb, David A.; Boyatsis, Richard E. (1968). On the dynamics of the helping relationship. Cambridge, Massachusetts: Massachusetts Institute of Technology.
- Kolb, D.A., Rubin, I.M., McIntyre, J.M. (1974). Organizational Psychology: A Book of Readings, 2nd edition. Englewood Cliffs, N.J.: Prentice-Hall.
- Kolb, D.A.; Fry, R.E. (1974). Toward an applied theory of experiential learning. Cambridge, Massachusetts: MIT Alfred P. Sloan School of Management.
- Kolb, D. A., Kolb, A.Y. (2011). The Kolb Learning Style Inventory 4.0
- Peterson, K., & Kolb, D. A. (2017). How You Learn Is How You Live: Using Nine Ways of Learning to Transform Your Life. Berrett-Koehler Publishers.

== See also ==
- Experiential learning
- Constructivism (philosophy of education)
