= Gay (given name) =

- Gender: male, female

Gay (alternatively Gaye) is a male or female given name, the 795th ("Gay") and 1295th ("Gaye") most common female name in the United States, according to the 1990 U.S. census.

It can also be used as a short form of the female names Gaynell and Gaynor and as a short form of the male name Gaylord.

The writer Gay Talese's name is derived from Gaetano, his grandfather's name.

The first name of the popular male Irish television presenter Gabriel Byrne was always abbreviated as "Gay", as in the title of his radio show The Gay Byrne Show.

== Women with the given name Gay ==
- Gay Abel-Bey, American film director, producer, writer, editor, and academic
- Gay Alcorn, Australian journalist and newspaper editor
- Gay Allison (born 1953), Canadian poet, editor, and English teacher
- Gay Autterson (born 1943), American voice actress
- Gay Blackstone (born 1952), American television and stage producer
- Gay Block (born 1942), fine art portrait photographer from Texas
- Gay A. Bradshaw, American psychologist, ecologist, and director
- Gay Bryant, British editor and writer
- Gay Caswell (born 1948), writer and political figure in Saskatchewan, Canada
- Gay Courter (born 1944), American film writer, author, and novelist
- Gay Cowbourne, Canadian politician
- Gay Hamilton (born 1943), Scottish actress
- Gay Jacobsen D'Asaro (born 1954), American Olympic foil fencer
- Gay Kayler (born 1941), Australian country music entertainer, recording artist and singer
- Gay Kernan (born 1947), American politician, Republican member of the New Mexico Senate
- Gay McDougall (born 1947), American human rights activist
- Gay Outlaw (born 1959), American sculptor, photographer and printmaker
- Gay Seabrook (1901–1970), American actress
- Gay Search, British horticulturalist
- Gay Thompson (born 1948), Australian Labor member of parliament
- Gay-Yee Westerhoff (born 1973), the Chinese-English cellist
- Gay Woods (born 1948), Irish musician and singer

== Men with the given name Gay ==
- Gay Wilson Allen (1903–1995), American academic and writer
- Gay Assulin (born 1991), Israeli professional footballer
- Gay Brewer (1932–2007), American professional golfer
- Gay Bryan (1927–2015), American long and triple jumper
- Gay Byrne (1934–2019), Irish presenter and host of radio and television
- G. T. Dhungel (born 1959), Indian politician
- Gay Elmore, American basketball player
- Gay Hayden (1819–1902), American pioneer
- Gay Hendricks (born 1945), American author and psychologist
- Gay Kindersley (1930–2011), British champion amateur jump jockey and horse trainer
- Gay Mandeville (1894–1969), the first native-born Bishop of Barbados
- Gay McIntyre (1933–2021), Irish jazz musician
- Gay McKenna (died 2004), Irish greyhound trainer
- Gay McManus (born 1958), Irish Gaelic footballer
- Gay Mitchell (born 1951), Irish Fine Gaelic politician
- Gay Mitchell (Gaelic footballer) (born 1948), Irish sportsperson
- Gay O'Carroll (born 1964), Irish footballer
- Gay O'Driscoll (born 1946), Irish retired Gaelic footballer
- Gay Sheerin (born 1955/1956), Gaelic footballer and manager
- Gay Talese (born 1932), American author

== See also ==
- Gai (disambiguation)
- Gaye (disambiguation)
- Guy (given name)
- Gay (nickname)
- Gay (surname)
