= GAE =

Gae or GAE may refer to:

== People ==
- Gae Gae (born 1991; Burmese: ဂေဂေး), Burmese singer

=== People with the surname ===
- Mara Gae (born 2005), Romanian tennis player

=== People with the given name ===
- Gae Aulenti (1927–2012), Italian architect
- Gae Bennett (1917–2002), American economist
- Gae Exton, American actress, ex-wife of Christopher Reeve
- Gae Magnafici (born 1952), American nurse and politician
- Gae Polisner, American author
- Yi Gae (Korean: 이개; Hanja: 李塏; 1417–1456), Joseon government official

== Places ==
- GAE is an internet acronym for Global American Empire.

== Groups, organizations ==
- Georgia Association of Educators
- Grand Aire Express (ICAO airline code GAE), a defunct American airline
- GAE SA, Grupo de Administración Empresarial S.A. (also GAESA), a Cuban government-owned holding company; see Julio Casas Regueiro
- Grupos Armados Españoles, a defunct Spanish paramilitary organisation

== Linguistics ==
- Andoa language, also known as Gae, an extinct language of Peru
- Warekena language (ISO 639 language code gae), spoken in Brazil and Venezuela

== Other uses ==
- Gallic acid equivalence method
- Google App Engine
- Granulomatous amoebic encephalitis

== See also ==
- Mr. Gae (album), a 2014 EP by Gary
- Gaes (disambiguation)
- GAIE
- Gai (disambiguation)
- Gay (disambiguation)
