= Gaye (disambiguation) =

Gaye is a commune in the Marne département in France.

Gaye may also refer to:

== Given name ==
- Gaye Adegbalola (born 1944), American guitarist, teacher, lecturer, activist, and photographer
- Gaye Advert (born 1956), English punk rock musician
- Gaye Cooley (born 1946), Canadian ice hockey player
- Gaye Dell (born 1948), Australian athlete, author, and artist
- Gaye Delorme (1947–2011), Canadian musical artist
- Gaye Kruger (born 1951), American actress
- Gaye LeBaron (born 1935), American columnist, teacher and historian
- Gaye McDermit (born 1945), New Zealand fencer
- Gaye Porteous (born 1965), retired Canadian field hockey player
- Gaye Rennie (born 1949), American Playboy Playmate
- Gaye Stewart (1923–2010), Canadian professional ice hockey forward
- Gaye Su Akyol (born 1985), Turkish singer, painter and anthropologist
- Gaye Symington (born 1954), Speaker of the Vermont House of Representatives
- Gaye Teede (born 1946), Australian netball player and coach
- Gaye Tuchman (born 1943), American sociologist

== Middle name ==
- Bobby-Gaye Wilkins (born 1988), Jamaican athlete
- Hafize Gaye Erkan (born 1979), Turkish-American banker
- Lady Mary-Gaye Curzon (born 1947), British model, socialite and debutant
- Marilyn Gaye Piety (born 1960), American philosopher and professor
- Pamela Gaye Walker, American actress, writer, director and producer
- Peta-Gaye Dowdie (born 1977), Jamaican sprinter
- Peta-Gaye Gayle (born 1979), Jamaican athlete
- Sasher-Gaye Henry (born 1979), Jamaican netball player and coach
- Sylvia Gaye Stanfield (born 1943), American diplomat

== Surname ==
- Abdoulaye Gaye (born 1991), Mauritanian footballer
- Abu Bakarr Gaye (1951–2010), Gambian politician
- Ali Gaye (born 1998), American football player
- Amadou Karim Gaye (1913–2000), Senegalese politician, physician and veterinarian
- Angus Gaye (1959–2022), British reggae musician
- Anna Gordy Gaye (1922–2014), American songwriter
- Anta Germaine Gaye (born 1953), Senegalese painter and sculptor
- Babacar Gaye (born 1951), Senegalese general and Force Commander for the United Nations Organization Mission in the Democratic Republic of the Congo
- Baboucarr Gaye (born 1998), Gambian footballer
- Birahim Gaye (born 1994), Senegalese footballer
- Birama Gaye (born 1964), Mauritanian football manager
- Charity Gaye Finnestad (born 1973), American author and blogger
- Cheikh Tidiane Gaye (born 1971), Senegalese Italian writer, essayist, poet and peace activist
- Dadi Gaye (born 1995), Gambian footballer
- Demish Gaye (born 1993), Jamaican sprinter
- Dyana Gaye (born 1975), Senegalese French director
- Frankie Gaye (1941–2001), American soul singer
- Gregory Gaye (1900–1993), Russian-American actor
- Haroun Gaye (born 1968), Central African warlord and general
- Howard Gaye (1878–1955), British actor
- Janis Gaye (born 1956), American singer and actress
- Jérôme Dodo Gaye (born 1939), Ivorian canoeist
- Lalya Gaye (born 1978), Swiss digital artist and interaction designer
- Lisa Gaye (1935–2016), American actress, singer and dancer
- Lisa Gaye (American actress, born 1960)
- Mamadou Gaye, Senegalese basketball coach
- Mara Gaye (1920–2005), American dancer
- Mariama Gaye (born 1993), Gambian-Swedish model
- Marvin Gaye (1939–1984), American singer, songwriter, composer, multi-instrumentalist, and record producer
- Modou Bamba Gaye, Gambian politician
- Mouhamed Ablaye Gaye (born 1983), Senegalese footballer
- Musa Gibril Bala Gaye (born 1946), Gambian politician, economist, banker and diplomat
- Neneh MacDouall-Gaye (born 1957), Gambian politician and diplomat
- Nona Gaye (born 1974), American singer, former fashion model, and screen actress
- Omar Gaye (born 1998), Gambian professional footballer
- Phoebe de Gaye (born 1949), British costume designer
- Thierno Gaye (born 1999), Senegalese footballer

== Other ==
- Gaye (song), a 1973 song by English singer-songwriter Clifford T. Ward from the album Home Thoughts
- Gaye family, American family of musicians
- Gaye holud, Bengali wedding ritual

== See also ==
- Gay (disambiguation)
