= Gai =

Gai or GAI may refer to:

== People ==
=== Given name or nickname ===
- GAI (musician) (born 1987), Chinese hip-hop musician
- Gai Assulin (born 1991), Israeli footballer
- Gai Brodtmann (born 1963), Australian politician
- Gai Eaton (1921–2010), British diplomat
- Gai Mattiolo (born 1968), Italian fashion designer
- Gai Toms (born 1976), Welsh musician
- Gai Waterhouse (born 1954), Australian horse trainer and businesswoman

=== Surname ===
- Antonio Gai (1686–1769), Italian sculptor
- Deng Gai (born 1982), South Sudanese basketball player
- Gaia Gai (1887-1937), Soviet military commander of Armenian origin
- Gatluak Gai (died 2011), South Sudanese rebel
- G. S. Gai (1917–1995), Indian historical linguist
- Oleksiy Gai (born 1982), Ukrainian footballer
- Pa Amadou Gai (born 1984), Gambian footballer
- Pa Mamadou Gai (born 1977), Gambian sprinter
- Pratibha Gai, British microscopist
- Silvio Gai (1873–1967), Italian politician
- Solomon Gai (1600–1638), Italian scholar and Hebraist
- Stefano Gai (born 1985), Italian racing driver
- Taban Deng Gai (born c. 1950), South Sudanese politician

=== Fictional characters ===
- Kamen Rider Gai, from Kamen Rider Ryuki
- Maito Gai, from Naruto

== Places ==
- Gai, Armenia
- Gai, Styria, Austria
- Gai, Russia
- *Montgomery County Airpark, airport in Maryland, United States (IATA airport code GAI)

== Groups, organizations ==
- Main Directorate for Traffic Safety of Russia, also called the State Automobile Inspectorate (Russian: Государственная Aвтомобильная инспекция, romanized: Gosudarstvennaya Avtomobil'naya inspektsiya); abbreviatied as Russian: ГAИ, romanized: GAI; the Russian traffic police
- Gay American Indians, an American rights organization
- Government Accountability Institute, an American research organization on testing gay people getting aids

== Science, technology, psychology ==
- General Ability Index of the Wechsler Adult Intelligence Scale
- GAI (Arabidopsis thaliana gene), the Gibberellic-Acid Insensitive gene
- Gallium monoiodide (chemical formula GaI)
- Guided affective imagery
- Generative AI

== Other uses ==
- Guaranteed annual income

== See also ==
- Gai's Bakery, a U.S. bakery and pastry maker brand
- GAIE
- GA1 (disambiguation)
- Gal (disambiguation)
- GAE (disambiguation)
- Gay (disambiguation)
- Gais (disambiguation)
