= Lodden =

Lodden is a surname. Notable people with the surname include:

- Ebba Lodden (1913–1997), Norwegian civil servant and politician
- Johnny Lodden (born 1985), Norwegian poker player

== See also ==
- Lodder
- Loden (disambiguation)
- Loyden
