= I'm Gay =

I'm Gay may denote:

- I'm Gay (I'm Happy), a rap album by Lil B
- "I'm Gay" (song), by 6AM
- "I'm Gay", a song by Bowling for Soup from their album The Great Burrito Extortion Case

== See also ==
- Gay (disambiguation)
