= Lesbian and Gay (disambiguation) =

Lesbian and gay are common terms for LGBTQ people.

Lesbian and Gay or Lesbian & Gay may also refer to:

== Starting with the term ==
- Lesbian and Gay Band Association
- Lesbian & Gay Big Apple Corps
- Lesbian and Gay Christian Movement
- Lesbian and Gay Equality Project
- Lesbian & Gay Foundation
- Lesbian and Gay Inter-University Organization

== Including the term ==
- Canadian Lesbian and Gay Archives
- Center for Lesbian and Gay Studies
- Children of Lesbians and Gays Everywhere
- Families and Friends of Lesbians and Gays
- GLQ: A Journal of Lesbian and Gay Studies
- London Lesbian and Gay Centre
- London Lesbian and Gay Film Festival
- National Coalition of Black Lesbians and Gays
- National Lesbian and Gay Journalists Association
- Norwegian National Association for Lesbian and Gay Liberation
- Parents, Families and Friends of Lesbians and Gays
- Seattle Lesbian & Gay Film Festival
- Tokyo International Lesbian & Gay Film Festival

== See also ==
- Gay (disambiguation)
- Lesbian (disambiguation)
- Gay and Lesbian (disambiguation)
