= Loden =

Loden may refer to:

- Marilyn Loden, American writer who coined the phrase "glass ceiling"
- Loden cape, water-resistant material (usually green) in Austrian traditional clothing made from sheep's wool, without removing the lanolin
- the Loden, artifact in the Shannara series
- Loden (musician), Belgian musician
- A modern spelling (alongside Lothen) of Loðen or Loþen, the Old English name for the historic Scottish region of Lothian.

== See also ==
- Lodden, a surname
