= President Gay =

President Gay may refer to:

- Claudine Gay (born 1970), president of Harvard University from 2023 to 2024
- Connie B. Gay (1914–1989), founding president of the Country Music Association

== See also ==
- Gay (disambiguation)
