= Gay (disambiguation) =

Gay is a term that now primarily refers to a homosexual person or the trait of being homosexual. The term was originally used to mean "carefree", "cheerful", or "bright and showy".

Gay, Gays, or GAY may also refer to:

== Places ==
=== In Europe ===
- Gay, Russia, several inhabited localities
- Gay Street, Bath, Somerset, England
- Gay Street, West Sussex, England

=== In North America ===
- Gay, Georgia, United States, a town
- Gay, Michigan, United States, an unincorporated community
- Gay, North Carolina, United States, an unincorporated community
- Gay, Oklahoma, United States, an unincorporated community
- Gay, West Virginia, United States, an unincorporated community
- Gay Farm, an historic colonial house, Petersham, Massachusetts, United States
- Gay Island, Nunavut, Canada
- Gay Street (Baltimore), Maryland, United States
- Gay Street (Knoxville), Tennessee, United States
- Gay Street (Manhattan), New York, United States
- Gay Township, Taylor County, Iowa, United States
- Gays River, Nova Scotia, Canada
- Gays, Illinois, United States
- Gays Creek, Kentucky, United States

== People ==
- Gay (given name)
- Gay (surname)
- Gay (nickname)

== Arts, entertainment, and media ==
- Gay (magazine), the first gay magazine in Toronto, Canada
- Gay?, a 1996 EP by indie rock band 12 Rods
- "Gay" (Not Going Out), a 2007 television episode

== Transport ==
- Gaya Airport, by IATA code
- Gay class fast patrol boat, 12 boats that served with the British Royal Navy from the early 1950s

== Other uses ==
- G-A-Y, a nightclub in London
- Gayo language, by ISO code
- Gay, a consonant in Pitman shorthand
- Gay Games, an international sporting and cultural event organized by and specifically for lesbian, gay, bisexual, and transgender (LGBT)
- Tropical Storm Gay, a list of tropical cyclones
- .gay, an internet top-level domain

== See also ==
- Gai (disambiguation)
- I'm Gay (disambiguation)
- Gay and Lesbian (disambiguation)
- Gaye (disambiguation)
- Gaysky (disambiguation)
