= Glass ceiling =

Obstacles keeping population from achievement

A chart illustrating the differences in earnings between men and women of the same educational level (USA 2006)

A glass ceiling is a metaphor usually set in relation to women, used to represent an invisible barrier that prevents a given demographic from rising beyond a certain level in a hierarchy. The metaphor was first used by feminists in reference to barriers in the careers of high-achieving women. It was coined by Marilyn Loden during a speech in 1978.

In the United States, the concept is sometimes extended to refer to racial inequality. Racialised women in white-majority countries often find the most difficulty in "breaking the glass ceiling" because they lie at the intersection of two historically marginalized groups: women and people of color. East Asian and East Asian American news outlets have coined the term "bamboo ceiling" to refer to the obstacles that all East Asian Americans face in advancing their careers. Similarly, a multitude of barriers that refugees and asylum seekers face in their search for meaningful employment is referred to as the "canvas ceiling".

Within the same concepts of the other terms surrounding the workplace, there are similar terms for restrictions and barriers concerning women and their roles within organizations and how they coincide with their maternal responsibilities. These "Invisible Barriers" function as metaphors to describe the extra circumstances that women go through, usually when they try to advance within areas of their careers and often while they try to advance within their lives outside their work spaces.

"A glass ceiling" represents a blockade that prohibits women from advancing toward the top of a hierarchical corporation. These women are prevented from getting promoted, especially to the executive rankings within their corporation. In the last twenty years, the women who have become more involved and pertinent in industries and organizations have rarely been in the executive ranks.

== Definition ==
The United States Federal Glass Ceiling Commission (1991–1996) defined the glass ceiling as "the unseen, yet unbreachable barrier that keeps minorities and women from rising to the upper rungs of the corporate ladder, regardless of their qualifications or achievements."

David Cotter et al. (2001) defined four distinctive characteristics that must be met to conclude that a glass ceiling exists. A glass ceiling inequality represents:

1. "A gender or racial difference that is not explained by other job-relevant characteristics of the employee."
2. "A gender or racial difference that is greater at higher levels of an outcome than at lower levels of an outcome."
3. "A gender or racial inequality in the chances of advancement into higher levels, not merely the proportions of each gender or race currently at those higher levels."
4. "A gender or racial inequality that increases over the course of a career."

Cotter and colleagues found that glass ceilings are correlated strongly with gender, with both white and minority women facing a glass ceiling in the course of their careers. In contrast, the researchers did not find evidence of a glass ceiling for African-American men.

The glass ceiling metaphor has often been used to describe invisible barriers ("glass") through which women can see elite positions but cannot reach them ("ceiling"). These barriers prevent large numbers of women and ethnic minorities from obtaining and securing the most powerful, prestigious and highest-grossing jobs in the workforce. Moreover, this effect prevents women from filling high-ranking positions and puts them at a disadvantage as potential candidates for advancement.

== History ==
In 1839, French feminist and author George Sand used a similar phrase, une voûte de cristal impénétrable, in a passage of Gabriel, a never-performed play: "I was a woman; for suddenly my wings collapsed, ether closed in around my head like an impenetrable crystal vault, and I fell...." [emphasis added]. The statement, a description of the heroine's dream of soaring with wings, has been interpreted as a feminine Icarus tale of a woman who attempts to ascend above her accepted role.

Marilyn Loden invented the phrase glass ceiling during a 1978 speech.

According to the April 3, 2015, The Wall Street Journal the term glass ceiling was notably used in 1979 by Maryanne Schriber and Katherine Lawrence at Hewlett-Packard. Lawrence outlined the concept at the National Press Club at the national meeting of the Women's Institute for the Freedom of the Press in Washington DC. The ceiling was defined as discriminatory promotion patterns where the written promotional policy is non-discriminatory, but in practice denies promotion to qualified females.

The term was later used in March 1984 by Gay Bryant, who is credited with popularizing the glass ceiling concept. She was the former editor of Working Woman magazine and was changing jobs to be the editor of Family Circle. In an Adweek article written by Nora Frenkel, Bryant was reported as saying, "Women have reached a certain point—I call it the glass ceiling. They're at the top of middle management and they're stopping and getting stuck. There isn't enough room for all those women at the top. Some are going into business for themselves. Others are going out and raising families." Also in 1984, Bryant used the term in a chapter of the book The Working Woman Report: Succeeding in Business in the 1980s. In the same book, Basia Hellwig used the term in another chapter.

In a widely cited article in The Wall Street Journal in March 1986 the term was used in the article's title: "The Glass Ceiling: Why Women Can't Seem to Break The Invisible Barrier That Blocks Them From the Top Jobs". The article was written by Carol Hymowitz and Timothy D. Schellhardt. Hymowitz and Schellhardt introduced glass ceiling was "not something that could be found in any corporate manual or even discussed at a business meeting; it was originally introduced as an invisible, covert, and unspoken phenomenon that existed to keep executive level leadership positions in the hands of Caucasian males."

As the term "glass ceiling" became more common, the public responded with differing ideas and opinions. Some argued that the concept is a myth because women choose to stay home and showed less dedication to advance into executive positions. As a result of continuing public debate, the US Labor Department's chief, Lynn Morley Martin, reported the results of a research project called "The Glass Ceiling Initiative", formed to investigate the low numbers of women and minorities in executive positions. This report defined the new term as "those artificial barriers based on attitudinal or organizational bias that prevent qualified individuals from advancing upward in their organization into management-level positions."

In 1991, as a part of Title II of the Civil Right Act of 1991, The United States Congress created the Glass Ceiling Commission. This 21 member Presidential Commission was chaired by Secretary of Labor Robert Reich, and was created to study the "barriers to the advancement of minorities and women within corporate hierarchies[,] to issue a report on its findings and conclusions, and to make recommendations on ways to dis- mantle the glass ceiling." The commission conducted extensive research including, surveys, public hearings and interviews, and released their findings in a report in 1995. The report, "Good for Business", offered "tangible guidelines and solutions on how these barriers can be overcome and eliminated". The goal of the commission was to provide recommendations on how to "shatter" the glass ceiling, specifically in the world of business. The report issued 12 recommendations on how to improve the workplace by increasing diversity in organizations and reducing discrimination through policy.

The number of women CEOs in the Fortune Lists has increased between 1998 and 2020, despite women's labor force participation rate decreasing globally from 52.4% to 49.6% between 1995 and 2015. Only 19.2% of S&P 500 Board Seats were held by women in 2014, 80.2% of whom were considered white.

== Glass Ceiling Index ==
In 2017, The Economist updated their Glass Ceiling Index, combining data on higher education, labour-force participation, pay, child-care costs, maternity and paternity rights, business-school applications, and representation in senior jobs. The countries where inequality was the lowest were Iceland, Sweden, Norway, Finland, and Poland.

== Gender stereotypes ==
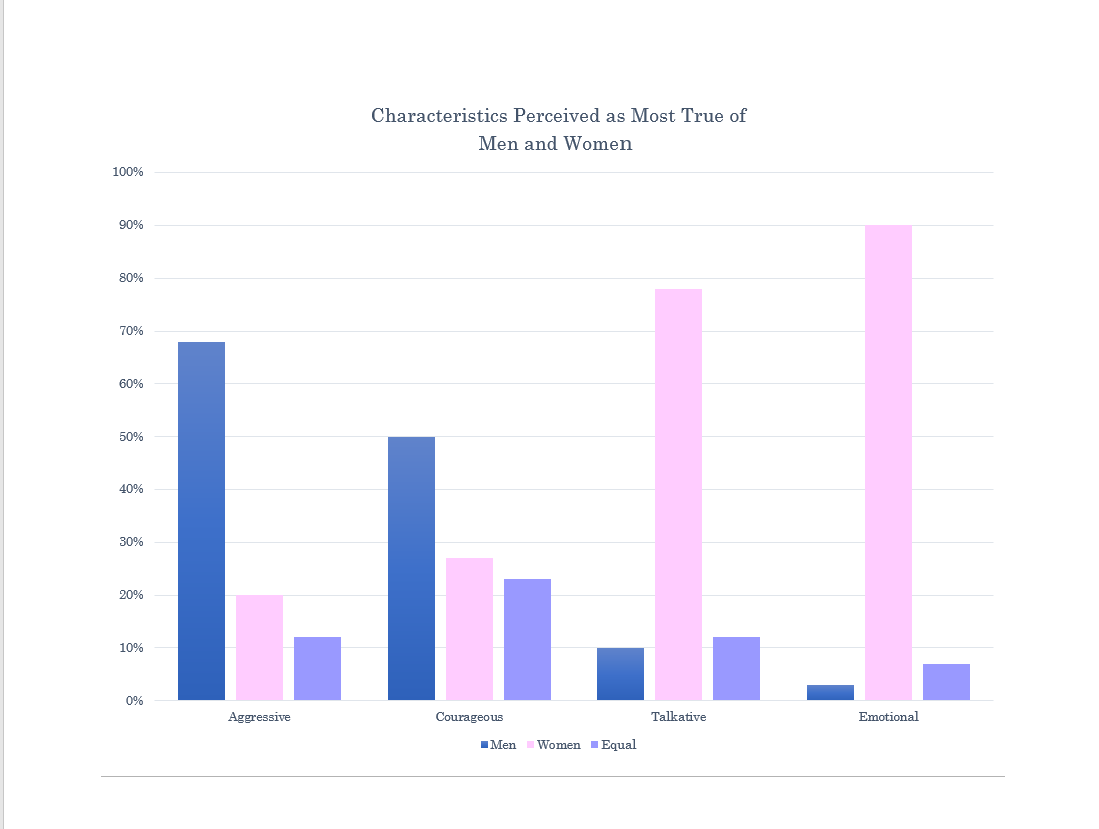
2001 Gallup Poll: Men are perceived as more aggressive, women are perceived as more emotional

In a 1993 report released through the U.S. Army Research Institute for the Behavioral and Social Sciences, researchers noted that although women have the same educational opportunities as their male counterparts, the Glass Ceiling persist due to systematic barriers, low representation, mobility, and stereotypes. The perpetuation of sexist stereotypes is one widely recognized reason as to why female employees are systematically inhibited from receiving advantageous opportunities in their chosen fields. A majority of Americans perceive women to be more emotional and men to be more aggressive. Gender stereotypes influence how leaders are chosen by employers and how workers of different sex are treated. Another stereotype towards women in workplaces is known as the "gender status belief" which claims that men are more competent and intelligent than women, which would explain why they have higher positions in the career hierarchy. Ultimately, this factor leads to perception of gender-based jobs in the labor market, so men are expected to have more work-related qualifications and hired for top positions. Perceived feminine stereotypes contribute to the glass ceiling faced by women in the workforce.

Gender stereotyping is thinking that men are better than women in management and leadership roles; it is the concept of alluding that women are inferior and better suited in their biological roles of mother and spouse. The nature of this stereotype is toxic and hindering to women's success and their rights in every aspect but it is even more damaging in the workplace in a patriarchal society. It represents an invisible but strong barrier that stands in the way of women. Men are put at the utmost positions for they are primally viewed as better leaders whereas women are stuck in low or medium level positions. These barriers to women's progression in management roles and a of significant issue. For example, the few women that have worked hard and relentlessly to break those barriers and have earned their deserving place in a leadership role are either viewed as "competent or warm" but never both. This is because the idea of a successful woman is stereotyped within the idea that she must be a ruthless, competitive, cold person whereas a woman of a warm and caring nature will be perceived as not having the right skill set for leadership and progression because "she does not have what it takes".

== Hiring practices ==
When women leave their current place of employment to start their own businesses, they tend to hire other women, and men to hire other men. These hiring practices (seemingly) diminish "the glass ceiling" effect because there is a perception of less competition of capabilities and sex discrimination. They appear to ally with the idea of "men's work" and "women's work".

In different stages of a hiring process, the glass ceiling presents itself through discrimination:

- Given two resumes with identical experiences and qualifications, the resume with a male name is more likely to be selected due to gender stereotypes.
- In interviews, women are asked about family and maternity plans.
- Job offers and promotions are lower for women due to beliefs that women are more family-oriented and will not prioritize the company, nor will they take on higher levels of risk.
- Women in leadership positions are evaluated at a higher degree and while some industries promote women more frequently than men, they are still compensated less.

== Pay Gap ==
The Glass Ceiling exists on a spectrum that impacts gender with factors of race, physical ability, and social class, which causes discrimination at lower levels of the hiring stage to shape who reaches senior levels at the company. This creates a chain sequence of gender barriers across fields and countries; in a 20 year research period of 86 studies, researchers found that glass ceilings are most notable in higher paying positions but the discrimination occurs at many levels of the company including "individual, social, and cultural structures" This is linked to women having a higher exit rate across levels of a company due to high risk, family commitment, discrimination, and decreased wages, causing male-domination of a field. This male-domination leads to "masculine communications and structures" which women can not integrate with.

== Cross-cultural context ==
Few women tend to reach positions in the upper echelon of society, and organizations are largely still almost exclusively led by men. Studies have shown that the glass ceiling still exists in varying levels in different nations and regions across the world. The stereotypes of women as emotional and sensitive could be seen as key characteristics as to why women struggle to break the glass ceiling. It is clear that even though societies differ from one another by culture, beliefs, and norms, they hold similar expectations of women and their role in society. These female stereotypes are often reinforced in societies that have traditional expectations of women. The stereotypes and perceptions of women are changing slowly across the world, which also reduces gender segregation in organizations.

== Overcoming glass ceiling ==
Despite significant improvement of women's participation in the labor force due to equity programs, advanced education levels, and work-life balanced policies, women are still underrepresented in upper-level positions in the workplace. There has been substantial invisible barriers for them to reach high-level management position such as lack of social capital, low level of self-efficacy and self-esteem, gender stereotypes, and masculine organizational culture. In fact, individual, government and organization effort are needed to break double glass ceilings in which not only cultural and gender biases but also limitation of access to resources and opportunities have been rooted in the male-dominated workplace.

=== "Individual effort" ===
One of the effective strategies that women can use to overcome the glass ceiling effect on their own is networking. Social networks are critical for promoting one's career and receiving access to resources. Establishing intensive connections within and outside an organization can contribute to better interpersonal understanding and reduction of negative stereotypical views of women and thus achieving career advancement in return. Social networks can be constructed through connections with individuals on various dimensions such as formal vs. informal, homogeneity vs. heterogeneity, instrumental vs. psychosocial and strong vs. weak ties. Women have strong capabilities of building and maintaining social relationship. They can create internal network within their organizations that influence on deciding promotion and acceptance while an external network with outsiders contributes to psychosocial support. They can build social networks in different ways depending on their social identity and cultural background. However, building and maintaining networks can be time-consuming and not straightforward. Women can also face additional barriers to construct networks in an organization that have been dominated by powerful men.

The benefits accumulated from social networks become social capital for individuals. Thus, the quality of one's social network can determine the value of its social capital. Social capital can contribute several positive career outcomes such as task accomplishment and social support for career advancement. Women can enhance their social capital and promote their professional images through mentoring. Mentoring plays a critical role in supporting women to achieve executive-level positions in an organization. Mentoring means a senior with advanced knowledge, skills and experience helps a junior through career and psychological support. Career support includes sponsorship, coaching and visibility while psychological support includes acceptance, emotional support and role modeling. A supportive supervisor or mentor can enhance the opportunity of being appointed to the critical roles and increase the probability of actual promotions through temporary promotions. To achieve this, women can intentionally forge relationships across race, gender, occupation level and organizational culture. Moreover, they can borrow this kind of social capital from strategic partners to get important contacts. But, such kind of connection is related with only temporary promotions. Mentors are more likely to support the same-gender mentee in an organization. Female mentors may be sympathetic and understand about women's challenges and emotions in the battle of promotions. However, this benefit could be realized only when female mentors reach relatively high-level positions. In fact, it is difficult for women to receive mentoring from the same gender since there are fewer senior management positions occupied by women.

Positive attitude towards glass ceiling can also help women to break glass ceiling. Optimistic beliefs about chances of being promoted in an organization can cause positive actions towards pursuing promotions. Resilience and denial are optimistic glass ceiling beliefs for subjective career success. Resilience means women believe that they are able to break glass ceiling: they can fight for their rights to promotion and career development. Denial means women think that men and women experience the same issues and barriers in pursuing executive positions. On the other hand, resignation and acceptance are pessimistic glass ceiling beliefs for subjective career advancement. Resignation means women are unwilling to break glass ceiling due to the belief of experiencing more negative consequences than men. Acceptance deals with women's preference on other goals such as family involvement instead of career advancement. Women who want to reach higher levels of management in an organization can analyze their levels of resilience and denial. Then, they will be able to build resilience skill through attitude, behavior and social support in order to overcome glass ceiling in a highly competitive contemporary workplace.

=== "Organization effort" ===
Overcoming the glass ceiling is a strategy for organizations aiming to achieve an increasingly diverse and complex world. To break through this barrier and promote diversity and inclusivity in leadership, organizations must adopt multifaceted and sustainable approaches including development of policies, programs, leadership commitment and evaluation.

1. Policies

Effective diversity and inclusion policies play a pivotal role in breaking through organizational glass ceilings. Firstly, organizations must develop robust recruitment and retention strategies that not only attract diverse talent but also address attrition rates among underrepresented employees through targeted retention programs. To foster diversity at all levels, from recruitment to promotions, organizations should establish clear and comprehensive diversity and inclusion policies. These policies should not only outline specific objectives but also incorporate metrics and strategies that serve as guiding principles. Furthermore, compliance with all relevant anti-discrimination and equal opportunity laws is fundamental in cultivating a fair and inclusive workplace. Moreover, transparency in promotion and succession processes is essential. Maintaining clear communication regarding the criteria for advancement empowers employees to understand and actively pursue leadership opportunities, thereby dismantling the glass ceiling and promoting a more inclusive and equitable workplace. In addition to focusing on policy, organizations should also prioritize their programs for breaking through the glass ceiling.

2. Program

Firstly, organizations should prioritize the creation of comprehensive diversity and inclusion programs that clearly show their dedication to fairness and equal opportunities to all employees in workplaces. In addition, ensuring fairness in promotions is vital. Transparent promotion criteria must be developed and consistently applied across the organization to maintain fairness and equal opportunities for all. Furthermore, the implementation of leadership development programs is essential to identify and nurture potential leaders from diverse backgrounds. These programs may include elements such as mentorship, training, and opportunities for high-potential employees to gain valuable leadership experience.

To increase awareness and mitigate unconscious bias, organizations should provide diversity and inclusion training for all employees, including management and executives. This training should equip individuals with strategies to minimize the impact of bias on decision-making and team dynamics. Lastly, organizations should create platforms and events that facilitate networking opportunities for employees from diverse backgrounds to interact with senior leadership. Enhanced visibility through these initiatives is paramount for career progression and reinforces an organization's commitment to breaking through the glass ceiling and promoting diversity and inclusion.

3. Leadership commitment

Firstly, leaders must exemplify unwavering commitment to diversity and inclusion, serving as champions of this vital initiative. This should be evident in the organization's values, policies, and in the actions of its leaders. Secondly, organizations should establish clear accountability mechanisms. Leadership should be held responsible for achieving diversity and inclusion goals, with performance metrics directly tied to these objectives. Additionally, promoting inclusive leadership is crucial. Organizations should invest in training their leaders to make equitable and inclusive decisions, manage teams with fairness, and engage in inclusive interactions. Effective communication plays a pivotal role in this journey. Organizations should transparently communicate their commitment to diversity and inclusion, both internally and externally. Regularly publishing diversity and inclusion reports helps maintain transparency and keeps stakeholders informed about progress. Lastly, cultural transformation is essential. Cultivating a workplace culture rooted in respect and open communication is paramount (Bhasin, 2020). Encouraging employees to report any instances of discrimination or harassment and providing a safe and supportive space for such reports is vital to addressing issues promptly and effectively.

4. Performance evaluation

To successfully overcome the glass ceiling at the organizational level, a commitment to continuous improvement is paramount. This entails regularly evaluating the effectiveness of diversity and inclusion initiatives through methods such as surveys, feedback mechanisms, and data analysis. Organizations must remain adaptable, ready to adjust their strategies as necessary to tackle evolving challenges and capitalize on opportunities for enhancement.

== Related concepts ==
=== "Glass escalator" ===
A parallel phenomenon called the "glass escalator" has also been recognized. As more men join fields that were previously dominated by women, such as nursing and teaching, the men are promoted and given more opportunities compared to the women, as if the men were taking escalators and the women were taking the stairs. The chart from Carolyn K. Broner shows an example of the glass escalator in favor of men for female-dominant occupations in schools. While women have historically dominated the teaching profession, men tend to take higher positions in school systems such as deans or principals.

Men benefit financially from their gender status in historically female fields, often "reaping the benefits of their token status to reach higher levels in female-dominated work".

A 2008 study published in Social Problems found that sex segregation in nursing did not follow the "glass escalator" pattern of disproportional vertical distribution; rather, men and women gravitated towards different areas within the field, with male nurses tending to specialize in areas of work perceived as "masculine". The article noted that "men encounter powerful social pressures that direct them away from entering female-dominated occupations (Jacobs 1989, 1993)". Since female-dominated occupations are usually characterized by more feminine activities, men who enter these jobs can be perceived socially as "effeminate, homosexual, or sexual predators".

=== "Sticky floors" ===
In the literature on gender discrimination, the concept of "sticky floors" complements the concept of a glass ceiling. Sticky floors can be described as the pattern that women are, compared to men, less likely to start to climb the job ladder. This is often due to discriminatory employment pattern that keeps workers, mainly women, in the lower ranks of the job scale, with low mobility and invisible barriers to career advancement. Thereby, this phenomenon is related to gender differentials at the bottom of the wage distribution. Building on the seminal study by Booth and co-authors in European Economic Review, during the last decade economists have attempted to identify sticky floors in the labour market. They found empirical evidence for the existence of sticky floors in countries such as Australia, Belgium, Italy, Thailand, and the United States.

=== "The frozen middle" ===
Similar to the sticky floor, the frozen middle describes the phenomenon of women's progress up the corporate ladder slowing, if not halting, in the ranks of middle management. Originally the term referred to the resistance corporate upper management faced from middle management when issuing directives. Due to a lack of ability or lack of drive in the ranks of middle management, these directives do not come into fruition and as a result the company's bottom line suffers. The term was popularized by a Harvard Business Review article titled "Middle Management Excellence". Due to the growing proportion of women to men in the workforce, however, the term "frozen middle" has become more commonly ascribed to the aforementioned slowing of the careers of women in middle management. The 1996 study "A Study of the Career Development and Aspirations of Women in Middle Management" posits that social structures and networks within businesses that favor "good old boys" and norms of masculinity exist based on the experiences of women surveyed. According to the study, women who did not exhibit stereotypical masculine traits, (e.g. aggressiveness, thick skin, lack of emotional expression) and interpersonal communication tendencies were disadvantaged compared to their male peers. As the ratio of men to women increases in the upper levels of management, women's access to female mentors who could advise them on ways to navigate office politics is limited, further inhibiting upward mobility within a corporation or firm. Furthermore, the frozen middle affects female professionals in western and eastern countries such as the United States and Malaysia, respectively, as well as women in a variety of fields ranging from the aforementioned corporations to STEM fields.

=== "Second shift" ===
The second shift focuses on the idea that women theoretically work a second shift in the manner of having a greater workload, not just doing a greater share of domestic work. All of the tasks that are engaged in outside the workplace are mainly tied to motherhood. Depending on location, household income, educational attainment, ethnicity and location, data shows that women do work a second shift in the sense of having a greater workload, not just doing a greater share of domestic work, but this is not apparent if simultaneous activity is overlooked. Alva Myrdal and Viola Klein as early as 1956 focused on the potential of both men and women working in settings that included paid and unpaid types of work environments. Research indicated that men and women could have equal time for activities outside the work environment for family and extra activities. This "second shift" has also been found to have physical effects as well. Women who engage in longer hours of work in pursuit of family balance often face increased mental health problems such as depression and anxiety. Increased irritability, lower motivation and energy, and other emotional issues were also found to occur as well. The overall happiness of women can be improved if a balance of career and home responsibilities is found.

=== "Mommy track" ===
"Mommy track" refers to women who disregard their careers and professional responsibilities in order to satisfy the needs of their families. Women are often subject to long work hours that create an imbalance within the work-family schedule. There is research suggesting that women are able to operate on a part-time professional schedule compared to others who worked full-time while still engaged in external family activities. This research also suggests that flexible work arrangements allow the achievement of a healthy work and family balance. A difference has also been discovered in the cost and amount of effort in childbearing between women in higher skilled positions and roles, as opposed to women in lower-skilled jobs. This difference leads women to delay and postpone goals and career aspirations over many years.

=== "Concrete floor" ===
The term concrete floor has been used to refer to the minimum number or the proportion of women necessary for a cabinet or board of directors to be perceived as legitimate.

== Quota doctors ==
Government intervention in the admission and promotion process results in beneficiaries being tagged as quota doctors. These quotas are floor quotas, having a required minimum; their contrast is for ceiling quotas, numerus clausus.

== See also ==
- Bamboo ceiling
- Celluloid ceiling
- Equal Pay Day
- Equal pay for women
- Female labor force in the Muslim world
- Feminization of poverty
- Gender equality
- Gender inequality
- Gender pay gap
- Gender role
- Glass cliff
- Glassdoor
- Material feminism
- Mommy track
- Sex differences in humans
- Sexism
- Stained-glass ceiling
- Superwoman (sociology)
- Time bind

== Bibliography ==
- Cholensky, Stephanie (2015). "The Gender Pay Gap: NO MORE EXCUSES!". Judgment & Decision Making. 10 (2): 15–16.
- Federal Glass Ceiling Commission (March 1995a). Good for business: Making full use of the nation's human capital (PDF) (Report). Washington DC: U.S. Department of Labor. Archived from the original (PDF) on August 10, 2014.
- Fox, Mary; Hesse-Biber, Sharlene N. (1984). Women at work. Palo Alto, California: Mayfield Publishing Company. ISBN 978-0-87484-525-9.
- Giele, Janet Z.; Stebbins, Leslie F (2003). Women and equality in the workplace a reference handbook. Santa Barbara, California: ABC-CLIO. ISBN 978-1-57607-937-9.
- Hesse-Biber, Sharlene N.; Carter, Gregg L. (2005). Working women in America : split dreams. New York, New York: Oxford University Press. ISBN 978-0-19-515047-6.
- Lyness, Karen S.; Thompson, Donna E. (June 1997). "Above the glass ceiling? A comparison of matched samples of female and male executives". Journal of Applied Psychology. 82 (3). American Psychological Association: 359–375. doi:10.1037/0021-9010.82.3.359. PMID 9190144. S2CID 25113738.
- National Partnership for Women and Families, comp. (April 2016). "America's Women and The Wage Gap" (PDF). Trade, Jobs and Wages. Retrieved 2 May 2016.
- Ponnuswamy, Indra; Manohar, Hansa Lysander (September 2014). "Breaking the glass ceiling – a mixed methods study using Watkins and Marsick's learning organisation culture model". Asian Women. 30 (3). Research Institute of Asian Women (RIAW): 85–111. doi:10.14431/aw.2014.09.30.3.85.
- Redwood, Rene A. (October 13, 1995). "Breaking The Glass Ceiling: Good for Business, Good for America". National Council of Jewish Women.
- Schneps, Leila; Colmez, Coralie (2013), "Math error number 6: Simpson's paradox. The Berkeley sex bias case: discrimination detection", in Schneps, Leila; Colmez, Coralie (eds.), Math on trial: how numbers get used and abused in the courtroom, New York: Basic Books, pp. 107–120, ISBN 978-0-465-03292-1
- Snyder, Karrie Ann; Isaiah Green, Adam (2008). "Revisiting The Glass Escalator: The Case Of Gender Segregation In A Female Dominated Occupation". Social Problems. 55 (2): 271–299. doi:10.1525/sp.2008.55.2.271.
- Woodhams, Carol; Lupton, Ben; Cowling, Marc (2015). "The Presence Of Ethnic Minority And Disabled Men In Feminised Work: Intersectionality, Vertical Segregation And The Glass Escalator" (PDF). Sex Roles. 72 (7–8): 277–293. doi:10.1007/s11199-014-0427-z. hdl:10871/16156. S2CID 144278250.
- Malpas, J., "Donald Davidson", The Stanford Encyclopedia of Philosophy (Winter 2012 Edition), Edward N. Zalta (ed.), <Donald Davidson>. Web May 2, 2016.
- International Labor Rights Forum. (n.d.). Retrieved May 2, 2016
- Hyun, Jane. Breaking the Bamboo Ceiling: Career Strategies for Asians. New York: HarperBusiness, 2005. Print.
- Wiley, John. The Blackwell Encyclopedia of Gender and Sexuality Studies. Vol. 5. Chicester: John Wiley and Sons, 2012. Print.
- Top 10 Numbers that Show Why Pay Equity Matters to Asian American Women and Their Families. Retrieved May 1, 2016.
