= Opdam =

Opdam is a surname. Notable people with the surname include:

- Barry Opdam (born 1976), Dutch footballer
- Eric M. Opdam (born 1960), Dutch mathematician
- Johannes Opdam (1916–1983), Dutch murderer
- Levi Opdam (born 1996), Dutch footballer
