= Gay (nickname) =

Gay is a nickname usually derived as a diminutive form of the given names Gaylene, Gayleen, or Gaylen for women, and Gaylord, or Gabriel for men. It is the nickname of the following people:

- Gay Bryan (born 1927), American male long and triple jumper who competed in the 1940s and 1950s
- Gay Byrne (born 1934), Irish presenter of radio and television. Most notable role was first host of The Late Late Show over a 37-year period from 1962 until 1999
- Gay McManus (born 1958), Irish retired Gaelic footballer with the Galway senior team
- Gay Mitchell (born 1951), Irish former Fine Gael politician
- Gay O'Driscoll (born 1946), Irish retired Gaelic footballer
- Gay Seabrook (1901–1970), American film, Broadway and radio actress
- Gay Thompson (born 1948), Australian Labor member for the electoral district of Reynell from 1997 to 2014
- Masaki Sumitani who also goes by the name of Hard Gay / Hardo Gay
- Eileen "Gay" Gibson (1926–1947), British actress and murder victim

== See also ==
- Gay (disambiguation)
- Gay (given name)
- Gay (surname)
- Gay Gordons (disambiguation)
