= Lodder =

Lodder is a surname. Notable people with the surname include:

- Arie Lodder (died 1958), Dutch murderer who was killed by John Opdam while in prison
- Matt Lodder, British Senior Lecturer in Art History
- Steve Lodder (born 1951), English musician

== See also ==
- Nel Roos-Lodder (1914–1996), Dutch discus thrower
- Lodders
