= Gay Bryant =

British-born editor and writer

Gay Bryant is a British-born editor and writer. She is credited with popularizing the "glass ceiling" concept.

== Early life ==
Bryant was born in Newcastle-on-Tyne, England. She attended St. Clare’s in Oxford for a year, intending to be a writer. In London, she became a junior fashion editor at Queen. During this period, she met playwright/director/social entrepreneur ED Berman and worked with him at the Mercury Theatre in North London. In 1969 she began a publishing career in New York.

== Career ==
Gay Bryant came to the US magazine world as part of the team that launched Penthouse. Before she was thirty, she began a feminist magazine, New Dawn, and continued making new publications thereafter; she was a founding editor of Working Woman and author of The Working Woman Report/Succeeding in Business in the 80's. She is credited with popularizing the "glass ceiling" concept. She was also the first female editor of Family Circle, then America's largest women's magazine. She edited numerous other magazines, notably Mirabella, the iconic magazine for smart women. She still is a VP at the New York Times Magazine Group and an executive editor at Murdoch Magazine groups in America and Australia.

In March 1984, when Bryant was the former editor of Working Woman magazine and was changing jobs to be the editor of Family Circle, an Adweek article written by Nora Frenkiel appeared in which Bryant was reported as saying, "Women have reached a certain point—I call it the glass ceiling. They're in the top of middle management and they're stopping and getting stuck. There isn't enough room for all those women at the top. Some are going into business for themselves. Others are going out and raising families." Also in 1984, Bryant used the term glass ceiling in a chapter of the book The Working Woman Report: Succeeding in Business in the 1980s. In the same book, Basia Hellwig used the term glass ceiling in another chapter.

== Awards ==
- 1992 National Magazine Award for General Excellence as editor-in-chief of Mirabella.
- Academy of Women Achievers YWCA 1979.

== Published works ==
She has written numerous articles and three books:

- The Working Woman Report/Succeeding in Business in the 80s Simon & Schuster 1984 ISBN 9780671474546;
- The Underground Travel Guide Award Books,1973,1974
- How I Learned To Like Myself Warner Books,1975

== Personal life ==
Bryant was married to the African-American writer, Charles Childs, with whom she has two children.
