= GAIS (disambiguation) =

GAIS or Gais, can refer to:

== Places ==
- Gais, Switzerland, a gemeinde in the Canton of Appenzell Ausserrhoden
  - Gais railway station
  - Schachen (Gais) railway station
- Gais, South Tyrol, a municipality in South Tyrol

== Groups, organizations ==
- GAIS, the football department of a Swedish sports club based in Göteborg
- GAIS Bandy, the bandy department of a Swedish sports club based in Göteborg

== Other uses ==
- German-American International School, now Alto International School, in Menlo Park, California

== See also ==
- Gai's Bakery, a U.S. bakery and pastry maker brand
- GAI (disambiguation), for the singular of GAIs or Gais
