= Loyden =

Loyden is a surname. Notable people with the surname include:

- Eddie Loyden (1923–2003), British politician
- Eddie Loyden (born 1945), English footballer
- Jillian Loyden (born 1985), American soccer player

== See also ==
- Lodden
