= Gaes =

Gaes or GAES may refer to:

== Groups, organizations ==
- German Academic Exchange Service (GAES; German: Deutscher Akademischer Austauschdienst; DAAD)
- School of Geography, Archaeology and Environmental Studies (GAES), University of the Witwatersrand Faculty of Science, Johannesburg, South Africa
- GAES. a Spanish company, a subsidiary of Italian hearing aid company Amplifon
- GAES (Spanish: Grupo Anti-Extorsión y Secuestro, lit. 'Anti-Extortion and Sequestration Groups'), part of the Bolivarian National Guard of Venezuela

== People and characters ==
- Nick Gaes, a U.S. American football player who played in the Missouri Valley Football Conference for 2021, 2022, 2023, 2024
- Commander Gaes, a fictional character from the Jack Campbell novel The Lost Fleet: Relentless

== Places ==
- Le Gaès Farmhouse, Ambarès-et-Lagrave, Gironde, Nouvelle-Aquitaine, France

== Other uses ==
- GAES, a boat that participated in the 2012 Transat AG2R

== See also ==
- Geas, a Celtic taboo
- Roland Gaess, West German and German parathlete skier and biathlete, who participated in the Paralympics in 1992 in biathlon and cross country skiing in 1988, 1992, 2002
- GAE (disambiguation) for the singular of GAEs and Gaes
