= Johannes Buxtorf II =

Swiss theologian (1599–1664)

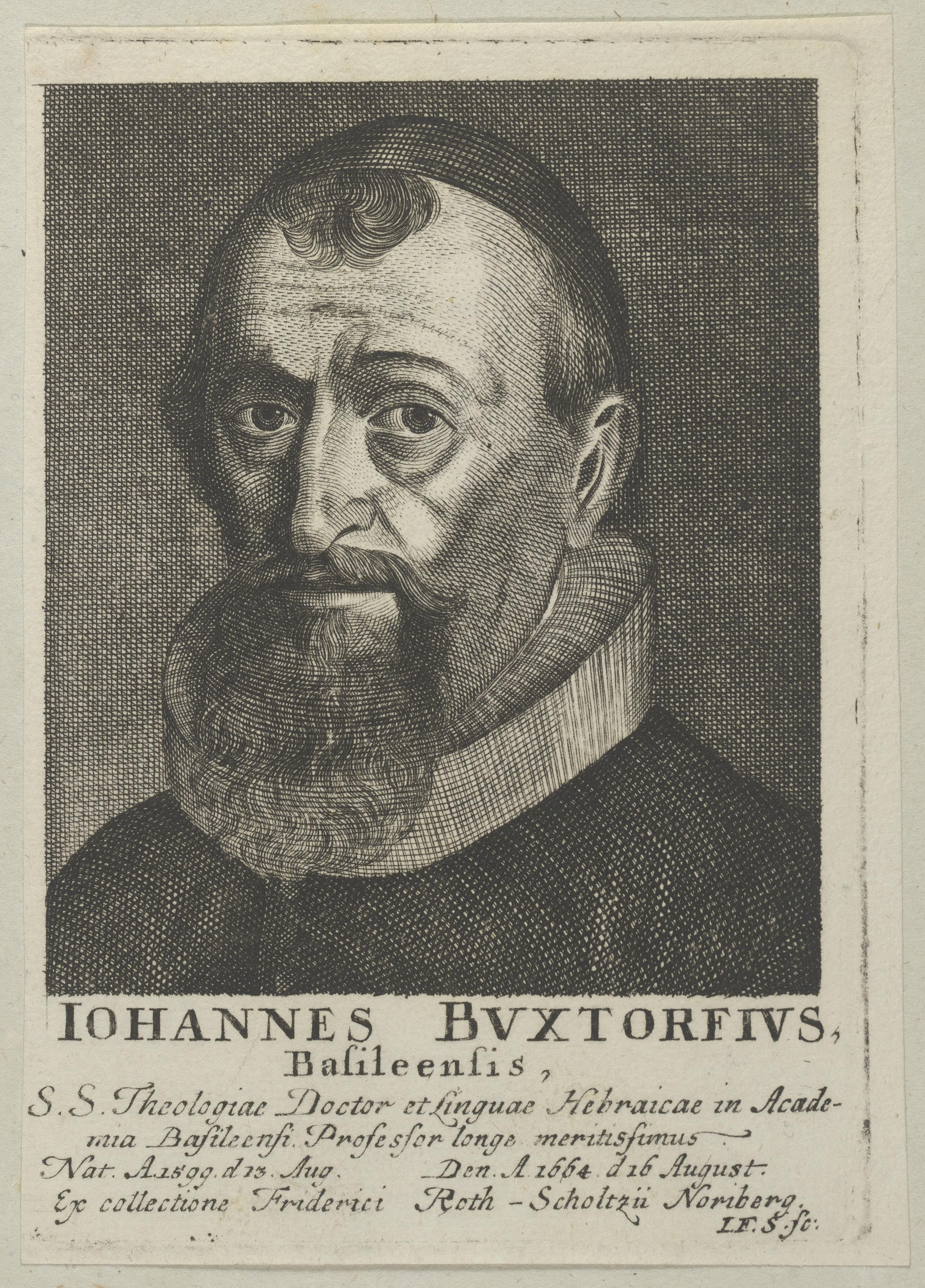

Johannes Buxtorf the Younger, (13 August 1599 – 16 August 1664) was the son of the scholar Johannes Buxtorf, and a Protestant Christian Hebraist.

== Life ==
Buxtorf was born in Basel, where he also died. Before the age of thirteen he matriculated at the University of Basel, and in December 1615 graduated as Master of Arts there. He went to Heidelberg, where he continued his studies under David Pareus, Abraham Scultetus, Johann Heinrich Alting, and others.

In 1618 he attended the synod of Dort, where he formed friendships with Simon Episcopius, Ludwig Crocius, and others. He succeeded his late father in the chair of Hebrew at the university; he gained an almost equal reputation, in the same domain, and was considered a chip off the old block. Although he received offers from Groningen, Leyden, and other places, he preferred to retain his position at Basel. He was four times married, and in his later years experienced many sorrows.

Like his father, Buxtorf maintained relations with several learned Jews. He employed Abraham Braunschweig to purchase Hebrew books for him; and for many years he corresponded with the scholarly Jacob Roman of Constantinople regarding the acquisition of Hebrew manuscripts and rare printed works. Buxtorf was also engaged in the sale of Hebrew books; among his purchasers being the commercial representative of Cardinal Richelieu, Stella de Tery et Morimont, who occasionally sojourned at Basel, and Johann Heinrich Hottinger at Zurich, with whom Buxtorf was on terms of close friendship. He also frequently furnished Hebrew books to the Zurich library.

Buxtorf corresponded not only with Jacob Roman and Leon Siau of Constantinople (the latter of whom afterward embraced Christianity and became physician-in-ordinary to a Transylvanian prince), but with the teacher Solomon Gai, and with the friend of the latter, Florio Porto of Mantua, both of whom were commissioned by Buxtorf to purchase Hebrew books in Italy; with the learned rabbi Menahem Zion Porto Cohen of Padua, whom Buxtorf did not treat in a very friendly manner; with Manasseh b. Israel; David Cohen de Lara of Hamburg; Jacob Abendana of Amsterdam, for whose "Miklol Yofi" he wrote an approbation; Isaac Abendana, brother of the foregoing; Joseph Delmedigo, with whom he was personally acquainted; and many others.

== Works ==
Buxtorf prepared new editions of several of his father's works [especially the "Tiberias"]; and, as in the case of the "Concordance" and the "Talmudic-Rabbinical Lexicon," completed and prepared for publication those that had been left unfinished.

Nineteen years after the death of his father he became involved in a controversy with Louis Cappel regarding the antiquity of the Hebrew vowel-signs; and although the question was one purely historical, it nevertheless contained a substratum of dogma, and in a number of polemical writings was conducted with great intensity and bitterness on both sides.

The following original works of Buxtorf were published:

- De Linguæ Hebraicæ Origine et Antiquitate (Basel, 1644; not as Herzog, 1643)
- Florilegium Hebraicum Continens Elegantes Sentencias, Proverbia, Apophthegmata: ex Optimis Quibusque Maxime vero Priscis Hebræorum Scriptoribus Collectum et . . . Alphabetice Dispositum (Basel, 1648).
- Tractatus de punctorum origine, antiquitate, et authoritate, oppositus Arcano puntationis revelato Ludovici Cappelli (1648), defending the authenticity of the vocalization "JEHOVAH". It was written to defend and elaborate upon a similar book by his father, Johannes Buxtorf Sr., entitled, Tiberias, sive Commentarius Masoreticus (1620 and 1664), arguing against Elias Levita's view of the late origin of the Hebrew vowel points.

Especially noteworthy also are Buxtorf's Latin translations of the "Moreh Nevuchim" of Maimonides: "Doctor Perplexorum" (Basel, 1629), and the "Kuzari" of Judah ha-Levi: "Liber Cosri" (Basel, 1660). Buxtorf also wrote a long series of dissertations on the writings of Abravanel, among which may be mentioned "De Sive de Excitii Poena," "De Longa Vita Primorum Parentum," "De Statu et Jure Regio," "De Mosis Nomine." All these first appeared singly, and then either as "Dissertaciones Philologo-Theologicæ" (Basel, 1662), or in Ugolino's "Thesaurus" (xxv.); while several others, such as "De Lepra Vestimentorum et Ædium," "De Poesi Veteri Hebraica in Libris Sacris Usitata," "De Principio Anni," etc., were appended to the translation of the "Cuzari."

== Bibliography ==
- Revue Etudes Juives, viii.74-95, xiii.260-276.

Rich biographical material on Buxtorf the Younger may be found in his unpublished correspondence, and also in that addressed by him to Hottinger (which is preserved in the public libraries at Basel and Zurich).
