= Lodders =

Lodders is a Dutch surname. Notable people with the surname include:

- Catharina Lodders (born 1942), Dutch model
- Helma Lodders (born 1968), Dutch politician
- Katharina Lodders, German-American cosmochemist
- Robin Lodders (born 1994), German basketball player

== See also ==
- Lodder
