= Gay and Lesbian (disambiguation) =

Gay and lesbian are common terms for LGBTQ people.

Gay and Lesbian or Gay & Lesbian may also refer to:

== Starting with the term ==
- Gay and Lesbian Acceptance
- Gay and Lesbian Activists Alliance
- Gay & Lesbian Advocates & Defenders
- Gay & Lesbian Alliance Against Defamation
- Gay and Lesbian Association of Choruses
- Gay and Lesbian Athletics Foundation
- Gay and Lesbian Equality Network
- Gay & Lesbian Fund for Colorado
- Gay and Lesbian Humanist Association
- Gay and Lesbian International Sport Association
- Gay and Lesbian Kingdom of the Coral Sea Islands
- Gay and Lesbian Medical Association
- Gay and Lesbian Tennis Alliance
- Gay & Lesbian Review Worldwide
- Gay and Lesbian Times
- Gay & Lesbian Victory Fund

== Including the term ==
- Association of Gay and Lesbian Psychiatrists
- Affirmation: Gay & Lesbian Mormons
- Chicago Gay and Lesbian Hall of Fame
- Dublin Gay and Lesbian Film Festival
- Harvard Gay & Lesbian Caucus
- Houston Gay and Lesbian Film Festival
- International Gay and Lesbian Human Rights Commission
- International Gay and Lesbian Football Association
- International Gay and Lesbian Travel Association
- Journal of the Gay and Lesbian Medical Association
- Journal of Gay & Lesbian Mental Health
- Leslie Lohman Museum of Gay and Lesbian Art
- Lisbon Gay & Lesbian Film Festival
- Los Angeles Gay and Lesbian Center
- National Gay & Lesbian Chamber of Commerce
- National Gay and Lesbian Task Force
- North Carolina Gay & Lesbian Film Festival
- Out In Africa South African Gay and Lesbian Film Festival
- Southwest Gay and Lesbian Film Festival
- Tampa International Gay and Lesbian Film Festival

== See also ==
- Gay (disambiguation)
- Lesbian (disambiguation)
- Lesbian and Gay (disambiguation)
