= Working Mother =

American magazine

- (cover, October–November 2014)
- Editor in Chief: Audrey Goodson Kingo
- President: Subha V. Barry
- Frequency: online only
- Founder: Milton Lieberman
- Founded: 1979
- Final issue: 2020 (print); 2022 (online)
- Company: Bonnier Corp.
- Country: United States
- Website: www.workingmother.com

Working Mother was an American magazine for working mothers launched in 1979 by Founding Publisher Milton Lieberman. The founding editor of the magazine was Vivian Cadden, who retired as editor in 1990. Subsequent editors have included Judsen Culbreth, Suzanne Riss and Jennifer Owens. In December 2016, Meredith Bodgas was named editor-in-chief.

The final print edition of Working Mother was published in 2020.

== History ==
Working Mother was launched by McCall Publishing Co. in 1979.

In 1985, Working Mother began publishing its annual 100 Best Companies for working mothers list, which was based on a survey of employers. Companies were evaluated on workplace policies and benefits, including parental leave, childcare support, and flexible work arrangements. In 1986, Working Mother and Working Woman, its sister publication, were sold to Time Inc. and Lang Communications.

In 1996, Lang Communications sold Working Mother, along with Ms. and Working Woman, to MacDonald Communications. The following year, MacDonald Communications reduced the frequency of Working Mother and Working Woman to 10 editions per year.

=== Working Mother Media ===
In August 2001, MacDonald Communications underwent restructuring and created Working Mother Media (WMM), which was composed of Working Mother and Working Woman. It was announced that Carol Evans would return to manage the new company. In a statement, Evans announced that Working Woman would fold after its 25th anniversary edition in September 2001.

In December 2006, Working Mother Media acquired Diversity Best Practices, a corporate membership organization. In September 2008, Bonnier Corp announced it was acquiring Working Mother Media. In 2010, the Working Mother Research Institute was founded by Jennifer Owens and made part of WMM.

In 2014, the magazine named Meghan Stabler one of its Working Mothers of the Year, making her the first openly transgender woman to receive that honor. That same year, the magazine reduced the number of issues it produced from eight to four.

Carol Evans left Working Mother in 2015 to start Carol Evans Enterprises. She was succeeded by Subha V. Barry. In December 2016, Meredith Bodgas was named editor-in-chief of Working Mother.

In 2018, Working Mother released its first Best Companies for Dads list.

The October/November 2020 issue was Working Mother's final print edition. Working Mother closed in 2022.

== See also ==
- Paid family leave
