= Kentaro Iwata =

Japanese physician and infectious diseases expert at Kobe University

- 岩田 健太郎
- Born: 1971 (age 54–55); Shimane Prefecture, Japan
- Education: Shimane Medical University
- Scientific career
- Fields: infectious diseases (HIV/AIDS), tropical medicine, travel medicine
- Workplaces: Mount Sinai Beth Israel; Kameda Medical Center; Kobe University; Kobe University Hospital

Kentaro Iwata (岩田 健太郎, Iwata Kentarō; born 1971) is a Japanese physician, professor and infectious diseases expert at Kobe University.

== Career ==
After his graduation from the Shimane Medical University (present-day Medical Faculty of Shimane University) in 1997, Iwata became a medical intern worked at Okinawa Prefectural Chubu Hospital. In the next year, he became a medical intern worked at St. Luke's Roosevelt Hospital of Columbia University.

Iwata started his career as an internist at Mount Sinai Beth Israel in 2001. In 2004, he returned to Japan and hired by Kameda Medical Center, he was appointed the head of Division of Infectious Disease, head of Comprehensive Medical Infectious Diseases. Since 2008 he served as Clinical Department Head Professor of Kobe University.

== COVID-19 outbreak ==
During the COVID-19 pandemic in Japan, the cruise ship Diamond Princess was quarantined in the Port of Yokohama in Japan. Iwata strongly criticised the management of the situation in two widely circulated YouTube videos published on 18 February. In videos, he described the conditions of quarantined Diamond Princess as "completely chaotic", and called the ship a "COVID-19 mill". Iwata briefly gained physical access to the ship, saying he observed no infection control measures in place. After being "kicked off" the ship after and then voluntarily quarantining himself, he stated "we have to do something about this cruise. We have to help people inside the ship." On 20 February, he deleted the videos himself, and said "there is no need for further discussing this". He also denied he had been pressured to delete the videos.

In April 2020 he expressed pessimism that the Olympics could be held in 2021.
