= Chân Mây Port =

Chan May
- Location of Chan May
- Coordinates: 16°20′N 108°01′E
- Country: Vietnam
- Province: Huế
- Time zone: GMT+7

Chan May Port is located in the south-east corner of Huế, Vietnam. It is operated by the Management Board of Chan May-Lang Co Economics Zone. Ownership of the Chan May Port may be assumed by the Vinashin Group in early 2008.

The port was used in 2006 as an assembly yard for Rio Tinto Alcan's G3 Project, where mining modules were assembled and loaded out on the newly constructed wharf to the mine in Australia's Northern Territory state. The port is mainly used for the wood chip industry. As of September 2012 there are no passenger facilities at Chan May Port.
