= Marilyn Gaye Piety =

American philosopher (born 1960)

- Born: 1960 (age 65–66)

Education
- Education: McGill University (PhD), Bryn Mawr College (MA), Earlham College (BA)

Philosophical work
- Era: 21st-century philosophy
- Region: Western philosophy
- Institutions: Drexel University
- Main interests: philosophy of religion, Kierkegaard
- Website: https://mgpiety.org/

Marilyn Gaye Piety (born 1960) is an American philosopher and Professor of Philosophy at Drexel University. She is known for her works on Kierkegaard's thought and philosophy of sport.

== Books ==
- Sequins and Scandals: Reflections on Figure Skating, Culture, and the Philosophy of Sport. Gegensatz Press, 2014.
- Ways of Knowing: Kierkegaard’s Pluralist Epistemology. Baylor University Press, 2010.
- Søren Kierkegaard, Repetition and Philosophical Crumbs, tran. M.G. Piety. Oxford: Oxford University Press, 2009.
