= Gay Courter =

American novelist

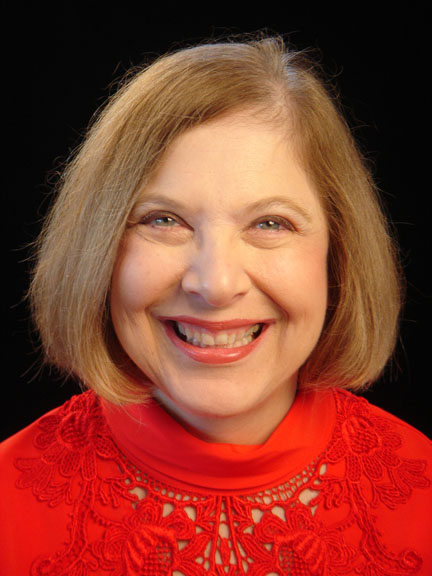
- Born: October 1, 1944 (age 82); Pittsburgh, Pennsylvania, U.S.
- Education: Antioch College (BA)
- Spouse: Philip Courter
- Children: 3
- Writing career
- Notable work: The Midwife
- Website: www.gaycourter.com

Gay Courter (born October 1, 1944) is an American author. Her first non-fiction work, The Beansprout Book (1973), introduced beansprouts to American supermarkets and the general public. She eventually became known as "The Pied Piper of sprouting." Her works have been translated into several languages, including French, Spanish, and Swedish. Courter is credited with being one of the first female writers to write a published novel on a word processor.

In June 2022, the French Police Authority suspected her of having resold 22 gold bars from the Prince de Conty, a French shipwreck that ran aground off Belle-Île-en-Mer.

== Biography ==
Courter was born in Pittsburgh, Pennsylvania to Leonard M. Weisman, an international businessman, and Elsie Spector Weisman, a social worker. She is the elder of two daughters.

Courter attended schools in Taiwan, Japan, and the United States and was homeschooled by her mother during their travels. She graduated from AB Davis High School and received a B.A. in Drama/Film from Antioch College in 1966.

From 1967 to 1970, she worked in the documentary and educational film business in New York with Harvest Productions, ACI Films, and Concord Productions. In 1972, Courter co-founded Courter Films and Associates with her husband Philip Courter. Together, they produced more than 200 documentary, educational, and corporate films.

Courter has been a vocal supporter of children's rights. She was a Guardian ad Litem in the Florida Courts for 25 years. Her non-fiction book, I Speak For This Child: True Stories of a Child Advocate, led to television appearances on the Today Show, Good Morning America, and 20/20.

Courter is also a travel writer for Creators Syndicate and other outlets. She is a member of the North American Travel Journalists Association, The Authors Guild, and the Writers Guild of America.

Courter lives in Crystal River, Florida with her husband. They have three children.

=== Diamond Princess ===
In February 2020, Courter was one of 3,700 passengers and crew quarantined on the Diamond Princess cruise ship, which was held in port at Yokohama, Japan during the coronavirus outbreak. In an interview with The New York Times, Courter questioned the efficacy of keeping passengers quarantined on board the ship, where the virus was rapidly spreading. The Atlantic published a piece by Courter, detailing her trip to Asia, her time on the Diamond Princess, and her experience in quarantine once back in the United States. Courter feared she and her husband would suffer from symptoms of PTSD. Their experiences later became the book Quarantine! How I Survived the Diamond Princess Coronavirus Crisis.

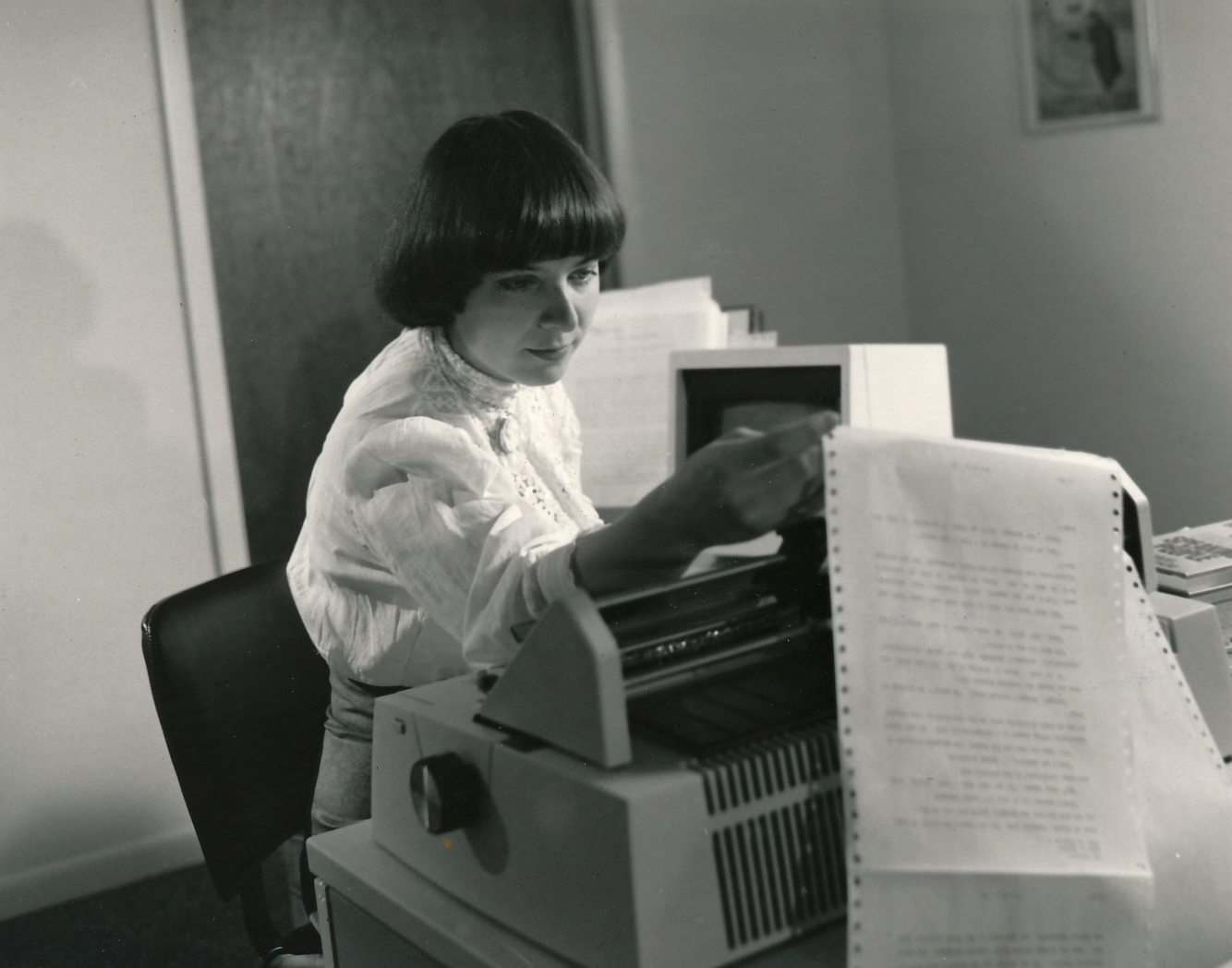
Gay Courter works on her IBM System/6 while writing her book, The Midwife.

== Literary styles and themes ==
Courter has written novels in both the first person and third person narrative styles. Many of her stories are based in places where she lived, such as central Brazil and Israel; people she has known, including her paternal grandmother, who was a Russian midwife; and Israeli spies, who were family friends. Her father was an arms merchant for Israel and purchased an aircraft carrier for their navy.

== Film producer ==
Together with her husband, Gay has produced more than 200 documentary and educational films for more than thirty years.

Their PBS productions include Freedom From Famine: The Norman Borlaug Story (Mathile/PBS 2009), Solutions Micro.doc series (WEDU/PBS, 1998), Where’s My Chance? The Case for America’s Children (WEDU/PBS, 1994), and The Florida Water Story (WEDU/PBS, 1988).

In 1995, Courter received special recognition from the Florida Chapter of American Women in Radio and Television, Inc. for her work on Where's My Chance? The Case for Our Children, which also won an Emmy award. Courter received her second Emmy from the National Academy of Arts and Television Sciences, Suncoast Chapter, for a series of public service announcements called Solutions for America’s Children.

== Advocacy ==
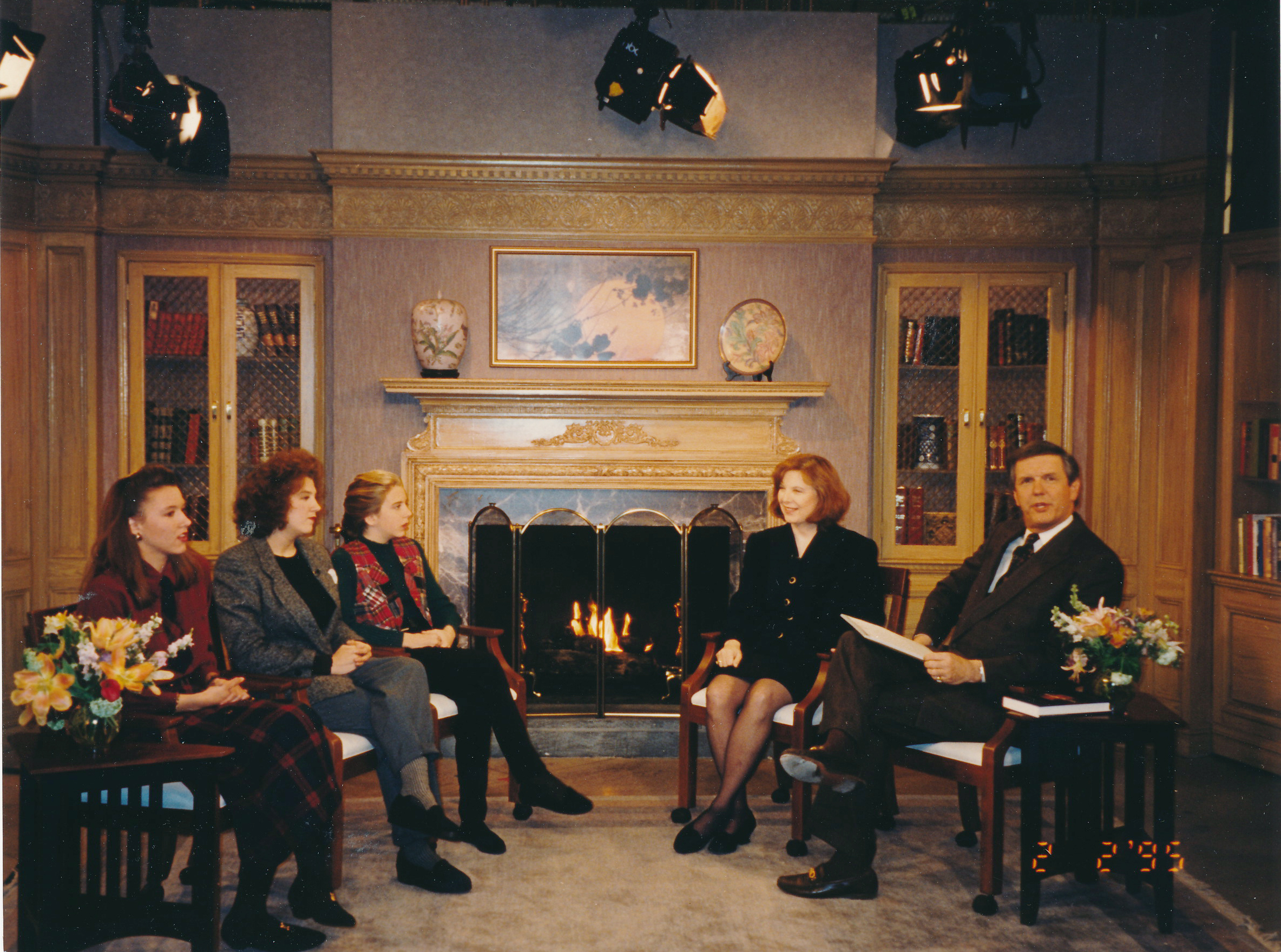
Gay Courter sits alongside Charles Gibson at ABC's Good Morning America in February 1995 with several youth Courter helped get adopted

Since becoming a Guardian ad Litem in Florida, Courter has advocated for children on a local and national level. Her 1995 book, I Speak For This Child, brought worldwide attention to the issues of children languishing in foster care. Courter and her husband shifted the focus of their company to documenting the plight of foster children and produced over 75 films on the subject.

Courter has appeared as an advocate in the press, on national television, and at numerous conferences promoting Court-appointed Special Advocates (CASA), Guardians ad litem, foster and adoptive parenting. She widened her advocacy to litigate for policy and statute change and also to represent the victims of systemic abuse in personal injury and civil rights lawsuits.

== Awards and honors ==
- U.S. Congressional Angel in Adoption, 2005.

== Published works ==
=== Novels ===
- (1981) The Midwife - Boston: Houghton Mifflin - ISBN 0395294630 | OCLC 222278660
- (1984) River of Dreams - Boston: Houghton Mifflin - ISBN 0395353017 | OCLC 990378800
- (1986) Code Ezra - Boston: Houghton Mifflin - ISBN 0395364388 | OCLC 990267219
- (1990) Flowers in the Blood - New York: Dutton - ISBN 0525248978 | OCLC 55880474
- (1992) The Midwife's Advice - New York: Dutton - ISBN 0525934944 | OCLC 231690264
- (2013) Healing Paradise - Crystal River: Egret - ASIN# B00PKRLHC
- (2019) The Girl in the Box - Crystal River: Egret - ASIN# B07XY2M91W

=== Non-fiction ===
- (1973) The Beansprout Book - New York: Simon and Schuster - ISBN 0671215965 | OCLC 948737482
- (1995) I Speak for this Child: True Stories of a Child Advocate - New York: Crown - ISBN 9780595168392 | OCLC 48562295
- (2003) How to Survive Your Husband's Midlife Crisis - New York: Penguin (co-written with Pat Gaudette) ISBN 9780982561751 | OCLC 747430402
- (2020) Quarantine! How I Survived the Diamond Princess Cornonavirus Crisis-New York: Post Hill Press/Simon and Schuster - ISBN 9781642936834
