= Gay Farm =

- U.S. National Register of Historic Places
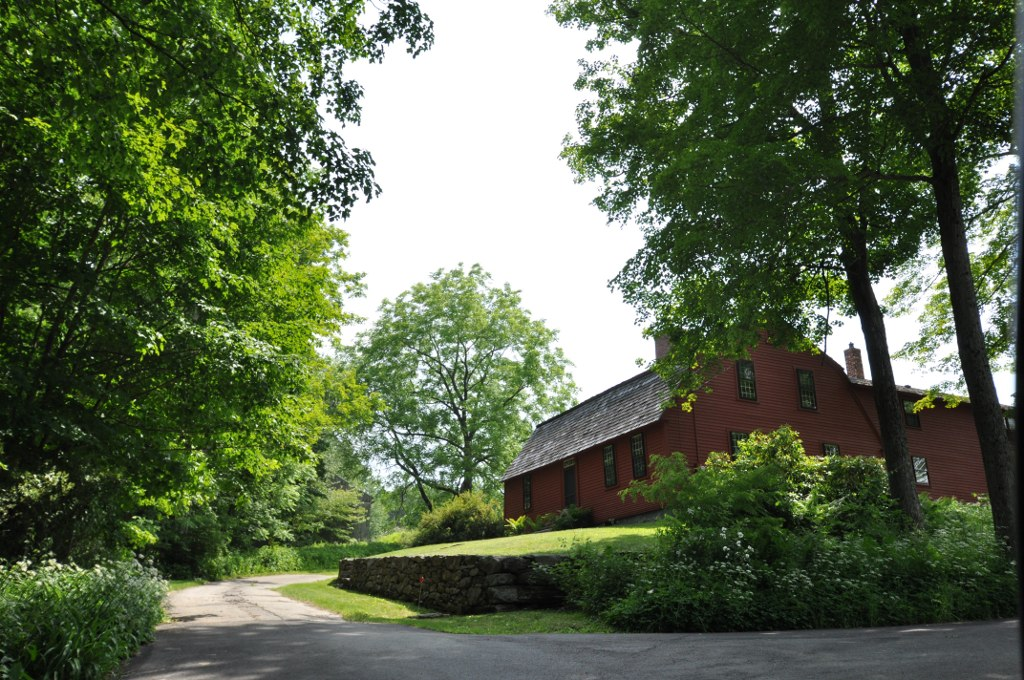

- Location within Massachusetts Location within the United States
- Nearest city: Petersham, Massachusetts
- Coordinates: 42°27′50″N 72°11′6″W
- Built: 1740
- NRHP reference No.: 77000201
- Added to NRHP: September 22, 1977

Gay Farm is a historic colonial house located on the north side of Nichewaug Hill in Petersham, Massachusetts. Built in 1740 by William Negus, the house is the oldest surviving building in Petersham. Negus' family owned the home until 1819, when Joel Stearns purchased the property. Thomas Stevens Howe, great grandson of William Negus, purchased the home in 1847 and lived there until his death in 1893. His daughter Elizabeth and her husband Charles M. Gay lived in the house during their lifetimes, giving it its current name. Not having any children, the home then passed to their relative Lewis H. Babbitt and his wife Corinne who lived out their lives there.

The farm was added to the National Register of Historic Places in 1977.

== See also ==
- National Register of Historic Places listings in Worcester County, Massachusetts
