= GA1 =

GA1 or GA-1 may refer to:

== Science and Medicine ==
- GA1, Glutaric aciduria type 1, an inherited genetic disorder
- GA1, Gibberellin A1, a form of the gibberellin plant hormone

== Transport ==
- Boeing GA-1, a 1921 American armored triplane
- Celair GA-1 Celstar, South African aerobatic glider
- GA 1, the U.S. Route 27 in Georgia, USA

== Other ==
- Ga1, Golden Axe (video game), a side-scrolling arcade hack and slash game released in 1989 by Sega
- GA-1, Georgia's 1st congressional district
- GA1, the United Nations General Assembly First Committee (also DISEC or C1)
