= Gaysky =

Gaysky (masculine), Gayskaya (feminine), or Gayskoye (neuter) may refer to:

- Gaysky District, a district of Orenburg Oblast, Russia
- Gaysky mine
- Gaysky Urban Okrug, a municipal formation in Orenburg Oblast, Russia
