= Marilyn Loden =

American writer, management consultant, and diversity advocate (1946–2022)

- Born: Marilyn Teresea Downey; July 12, 1946; Hyde Park, New York, U.S.
- Died: August 6, 2022 (aged 76); St. Helena, California, U.S.
- Occupations: Activist, speaker, author
- Spouse: John Loden

Marilyn Loden (July 12, 1946 – August 6, 2022) was an American writer, management consultant, and diversity advocate. Loden is credited with coining the term "glass ceiling", during a 1978 speech. Loden was a featured panelist on the BBC series 100 Women where she discussed the role of gender discrimination in the workplace. She was an alumna of Syracuse University. She authored three books that focused on employee diversity in the workforce.

== Personal life and death ==
Loden was born on July 12, 1946, in New Hyde Park, New York. She died a year after being diagnosed with lung cancer, on August 6, 2022, at the age of 76.

== Bibliography ==
- Feminine Leadership, or, How to Succeed in Business Without Being One of the Boys. New York: Times Books, 1985. ISBN 0812912403 OCLC 12133597
- and Judy B Rosener. Workforce America!: Managing Employee Diversity As a Vital Resource. Homewood, Ill.: Business One Irwin, 1991. ISBN 1556233868 OCLC 22207635
- Implementing Diversity. Chicago: Irwin Professional, 1996. ISBN 078630460X OCLC 32704873
