= I'm Gay (song) =

- Cover of official single

Single by 6 AM feat. Cissi Ramsby
- Released: 18 July 2014
- Recorded: 2007
- Genre: Europop
- Length: 2:50
- Label: WEA Records AB (Sweden)
- Songwriters: J. Dennis, J. Bejerholm and U. Turesson
- Producer: Johan Bejerholm

"I'm Gay" is a Swedish pop song by the Swedish pop duo 6 AM made up of Alex Falk (a contestant on Swedish Idol 2004) and Martin Strand, featuring Cissi Ramsby (a contestant on Swedish Idol 2006).

The song written by J.Dennis, J. Bejerholm and U. Turesson and produced by Johan Bejerholm was adopted as the official song for the Swedish annual gay Pride-låten event held in Stockholm in 2007. The song samples the song Go West by Village People. "I'm Gay" became very popular in Sweden and was released as a single topping the Swedish Singles Chart for 1 week for the week ending 9 August 2007. They also performed the song on Sommarkrysset on Sweden's TV4 television station.

== Track list ==
The song was released on 18 July 2007 on CD and as a maxi-single on WEA Records AB (Sweden) containing five tracks:

- I'm Gay (SoundFactory radio edit) – remix – SoundFactory
- I'm Gay (original version)
- I'm Gay (SoundFactory club anthem) – REMIX – SoundFactory
- I'm Gay (SoundFactory dark dub) – remix – SoundFactory
- I'm Gay (instrumental version)

Year (2007)	Top position
Swedish Singles Chart	1
