= Solomon Gai =

Italian scholar (1600–1638)

Solomon Gai (1600 – August 1638) was an Italian scholar and hebraist. He was born and died in Mantua.

Gai is chiefly known as the correspondent and friend of Johannes Buxtorf II. In a letter which he wrote to Buxtorf from Mantua on November 6, 1637, Gai declared that he had emigrated to Botzen, a town in the South Tyrol, where he had become the tutor of the two sons of a rich man named Jacob Moravia. He studied German at Botzen, and after a stay of five years and a half returned to Mantua.

Buxtorf's Latin translation of the "Moreh" won Gai's admiration. Attributing the translation to Buxtorf the Elder, Gai wrote a letter expressing admiration for the father. Buxtorf explained to Gai that he himself was the translator, and sent him a copy of his dissertation "Diatribe" as a present. Gai wrote another letter to Buxtorf in Latin with a Hebrew introduction drawing his attention to works of which Buxtorf was unaware. Buxtorf subsequently commissioned Gai to purchase Hebrew books for him. Gai insisted particularly on obtaining Buxtorf's lexicons, as he planned to write a lexicon in collaboration with a cleric to whom he was giving Hebrew lessons.
