= Gay Gordons =

The Gay Gordons is a nickname of the Gordon Highlanders, a former infantry regiment of the British army. It is also applied to:

- Gay Gordons (solitaire), a form of the card game Solitaire (or Patience)
- Gay Gordons (dance), a popular ceilidh dance
- The Gay Gordons (musical), a 1907 musical comedy

Note that "Gay" in this phrase has the Scots meaning, "extraordinary" rather than the more commonly used English meanings.
