= Abu Bakarr Gaye =

Gambian politician (1951–2010)

Minister of Health and Social Welfare of Gambia
- In office 30 October 2009 – 2 December 2010

Personal details
- Born: August 26, 1951 Banjul
- Died: December 2, 2010 (aged 59) Banjul
- Education: Patrice Lumumba University

Abu Bakarr Gaye (26 September 1951 in Banjul – 2 December 2010 in Banjul) was a Gambian politician and the Minister of Health and Social Welfare of Gambia in 2009–2010.

== Biography ==
Gaye was born on September 26, 1951, in Banjul. From 1960 to 1965, he attended the Maburaki Secondary School in Sierra Leone. From 1967 to 1968, he studied in the USSR at the Patrice Lumumba University in Moscow. In 1973, Gaye received a doctorate in general medicine.

His professional career began in 1974 at the Ministry of Health of Sierra Leone. In 1977, he began working at Basse Hospital in Basse Santa Su. In 1979, he was appointed chief physician of Bansang Hospital in the village of Bansang and worked there until 1981. After that, until 1997, Gaye was engaged in private medical practice in Barra. Till 2004 he worked at the Ahmadiy Hospital.

On 30 October 2009, Gaye was introduced by the president of the Republic of the Gambia, Yahya Jammeh, to the Gambian Cabinet of Ministers and was appointed Minister of Health and Social Affairs. He succeeded Mariatou Jallow.

Gaye had a profound knowledge in the field of tropical medicine, and spoke fluent Russian, English and French. He was also fluent in several West African languages. Gaye died on December 2, 2010, at Edward Francis Small Teaching Hospital.
