= Gae Polisner =

American author

- Citizenship: American
- Occupations: Attorney; novelist
- Children: 2
- Writing career
- Genre: Young adult literature

Gae Polisner is an American author of young adult and crossover to adult novels. She is also a practicing family law attorney/mediator. She lives in Long Island with her husband and two sons.

== Books ==
- 2013 The Pull of Gravity
- 2015 The Summer of Letting Go
- 2017 The Memory of Things
- 2018 In Sight of Stars
- 2020 Jack Kerouac Is Dead to Me
- 2020, Seven Clues to Home, with Nora Raleigh Baskin

== Awards and honors ==
- In Sight of Stars 2018, received a Booklist Starred Review, and is the winner of a 2018 AudioFile Earphones Award; Michael Crouch narrating.
- The Memory of Things won the 2019 Golden Archer Award, Senior Division, Wisconsin's Children's Choice book award, and was a 2017 Wisconsin State Reading List final selection, a finalist for the New York Library Association's Three Apples Book Award, and a finalist for the Pennsylvania Keystone to Reading Book Award. It was the recipient of a 2016 Nerdy Book Club Award for Best Young Adult fiction, and was named one of the Most Anticipated YA's of Fall/Winter 2016 by Barnes & Noble Teen Blog, one of the Best New Books for Teens by the Children's Book Review, one of the 15 Must-Read YA Books of Fall by Brightly.com, and one of the Buzzworthy Books of Summer by YABooks Central.
- The Summer of Letting Go was the winner of the 2014 Nerdy Book Club Award Best Young Adult Fiction 2014, and received the Teen Ink Editor’s Badge of Approval.
- The Pull of Gravity was the winner of the 2011 Nerdy Book Club Award for Best YA Fiction; a nominee for the 2011 Yalsa Readers Choice award and the 2011 CYBIL’s Award; included in the 2012 Bank Street College Best Children’s Fiction and 2011 Pennsylvania School Library Association’s List of Best YA Fiction lists; and a 2013–14 National Battle of the Books Pick.
