= Mariama Gaye =

Gambian-Swedish fashion model

- Born: 3 December 1993 (age 32); Gambia
- Occupation: Fashion Model
- Years active: 2020–present
- Modeling information
- Height: 1.73 m (5 ft 8 in)
- Hair color: Dark Brown
- Eye color: Brown

Mariama Gaye (born 3 December 1993) is a Gambian-Swedish model known for her work in high fashion. She is a descendant of the royal Mali Empire and is an African princess. Gaye has worked with several prominent designers and brands and has appeared in numerous magazines including Vogue, Forbes, and Elle.

She is the first Gambian woman to be featured on Vogue Scandinavia.

== Early life and education ==
Gaye was born in The Gambia, but moved to Sweden at the age of 6 to be reunited with her mother. She completed her high school education in social studies and media from Lundellska school in 2012. Currently, she is enrolled in the law program at Uppsala University.

== Modelling career ==
Gaye started her modelling career at the age of 25 after being encouraged by her cousin to apply to modelling agencies. She was rejected by two agencies before finally being accepted by a smaller agency. After a year, she was featured in Elle, Vogue and Forbes. Despite her success, she faced bullying from other models and a couple of designers which caused her to consider taking a break from modelling. However, she persevered and joined MIKAs, the biggest agency in Sweden. She has since walked in several fashion shows, including Stockholm Fashion Week in August 2021, where she did two different shows and one was also shown on London Fashion Week. She has also been featured in multiple Vogue shoots, including a shoot in Denmark in March 2022. In April 2022, she walked the runway at the Elle gala in Sweden.
