= Diamond Princess (ship) =

Cruise ship

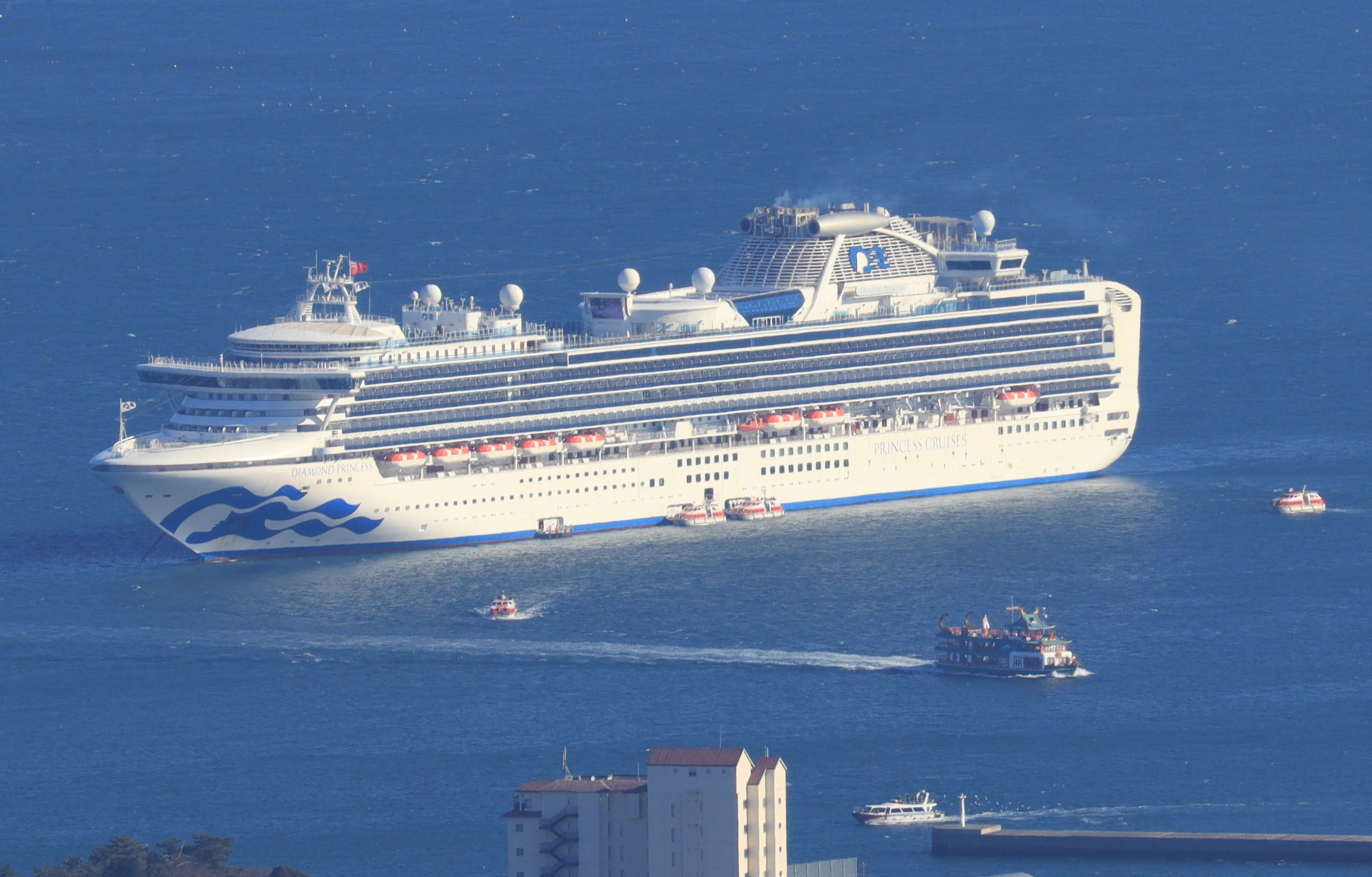
- Diamond Princess anchored in Toba, Kansai, Japan unloading her lifeboats on December 8, 2019

History

United Kingdom
- Name: Diamond Princess
- Owner: Carnival Corporation & plc
- Operator: Princess Cruises
- Port of registry: 2004–2014: Hamilton, Bermuda; 2014 onwards: London, United Kingdom
- Builder: Mitsubishi Heavy Industries
- Cost: US$500 million
- Yard number: 2181
- Laid down: 2 March 2002
- Launched: 12 April 2003
- Christened: 26 February 2004
- Completed: 26 February 2004
- Maiden voyage: 2004
- In service: March 2004
- Identification: callsign: 2HFZ7; IMO number: 9228198; MMSI number: 235103359
- Status: In service

General characteristics
- Class & type: Gem-class cruise ship
- Tonnage: 115,875 GT
- Length: 290.2 m (952 ft 1 in)
- Beam: 37.49 m (123 ft 0 in)
- Height: 62.48 m (205 ft 0 in)
- Draught: 8.53 m (28 ft 0 in)
- Decks: 16
- Installed power: Wärtsilä 46 series common rail engines
- Propulsion: Twin propellers
- Speed: 22 knots (41 km/h; 25 mph)
- Capacity: 2,670 passengers
- Crew: 1,100 crew

Diamond Princess is a British-registered cruise ship owned and operated by Princess Cruises. She began operation in March 2004 and primarily cruises in Asia during the northern hemisphere summer and Australia during the southern hemisphere summer. She is a subclassed Grand-class ship, which is also known as a Gem-class ship. Diamond Princess and her sister ship, Sapphire Princess, are the widest subclass of Grand-class ships, as they have a 37.5-metre (123 ft 0 in) beam, while all other Grand-class ships have a beam of 36 metres (118 ft 1 in). Diamond Princess and Sapphire Princess were both built in Nagasaki, Japan, by Mitsubishi Industries.

There have been two notable outbreaks of infectious disease on the ship – an outbreak of gastroenteritis caused by norovirus in 2016 and an outbreak of COVID-19 caused by SARS-CoV-2 in 2020. In the latter incident, the ship was quarantined for nearly a month with her passengers on board, and her passengers and crew were subject to further quarantine after disembarking. At least 712 out of the 3,711 passengers and crew were infected, and by mid-April 2020 nine had died.

== Design and description ==
The diesel-electric plant of Diamond Princess has four diesel generators and a gas turbine generator. The diesel generators are Wärtsilä 46 series common rail engines, two straight 9-cylinder configuration (9L46), and two straight 8-cylinder configuration (8L46). The 8- and 9-cylinder engines can produce approximately 8,500 kW (11,400 hp) and 9,500 kW (12,700 hp), respectively. These engines are fueled with heavy fuel oil (HFO or bunker c) and marine gas oil (MGO) depending on the local regulations regarding emissions, as MGO produces much lower emissions, but is much more expensive.

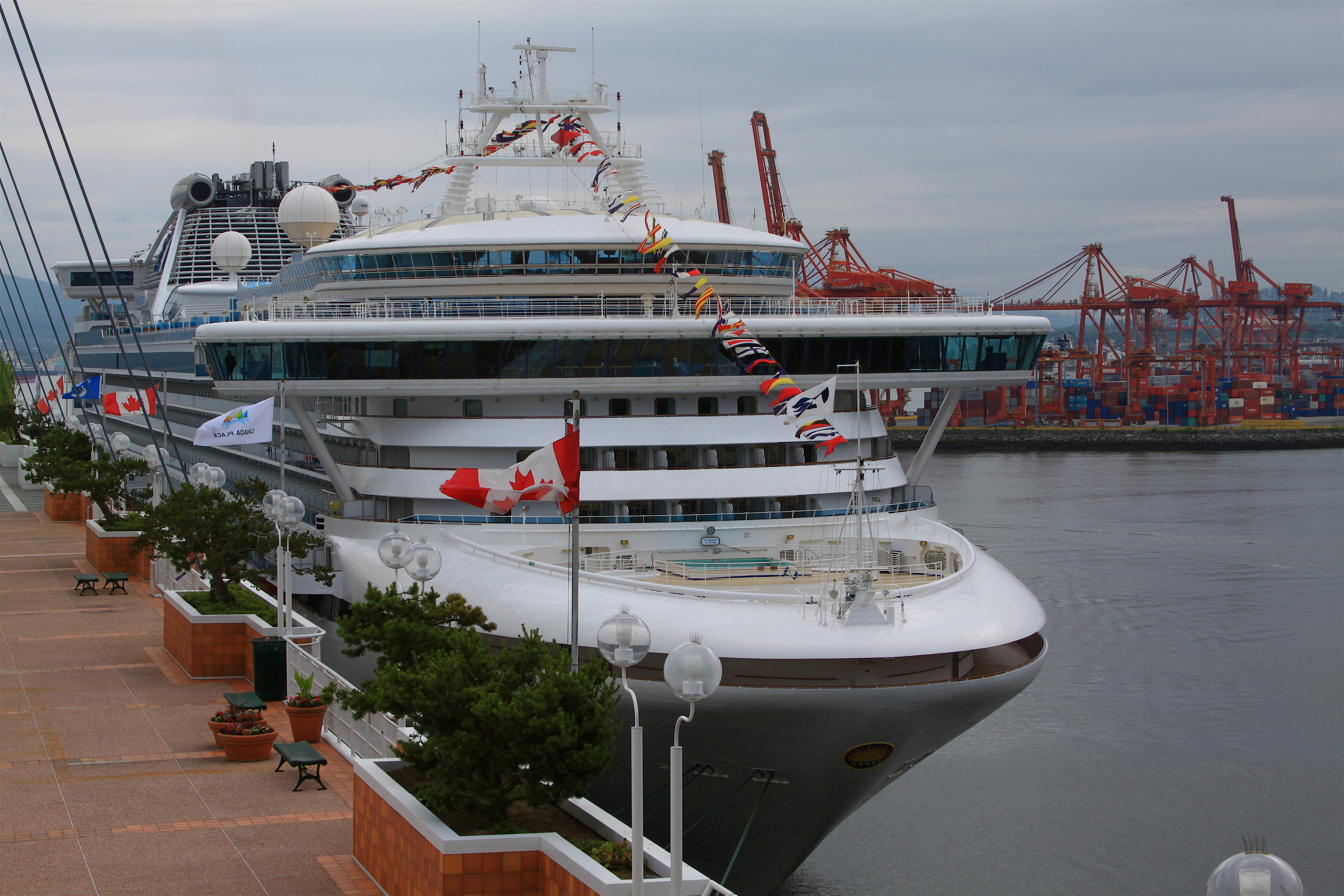
Diamond Princess docked in Vancouver, British Columbia, Canada on June 11, 2011

The gas turbine generator is a General Electric LM2500, producing a peak of 25,000 kW (34,000 hp) fueled by MGO. This generator is much more expensive to run than the diesel generators, and is used mostly in areas, such as Alaska, where the emissions regulations are strict. It is also used when high speed is required to make it to a port in a shorter time period.

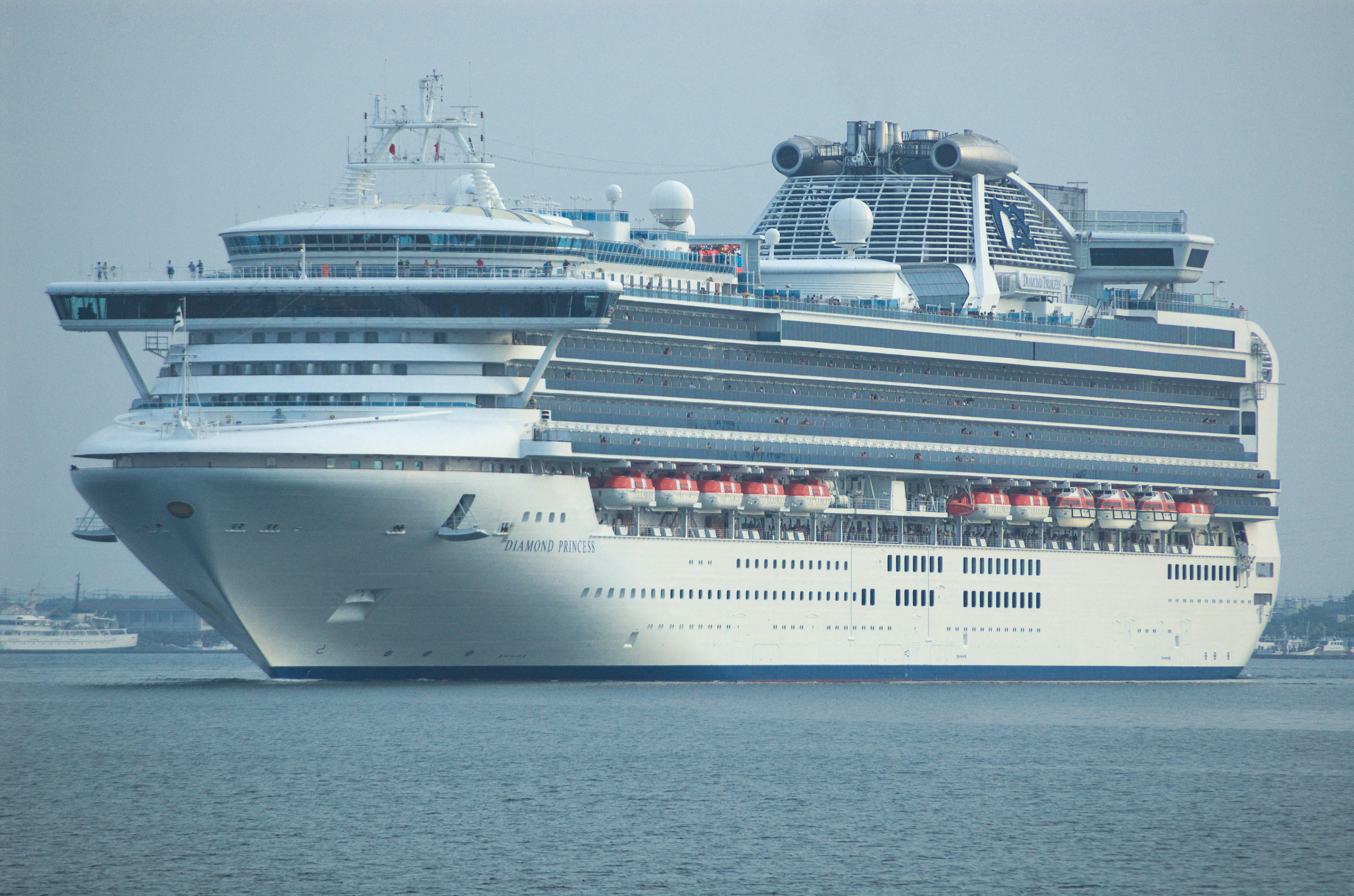
Diamond Princess at Toba, Kansai, Japan on 16 June 2014

There are two propulsion electric motors, driving fixed-pitch propellers and six thrusters used during maneuvering – three at the bow and three at the stern. The propulsion electric motors (PEMs), are conventional synchronous motors made by Alstom Motors. The two motors are each rated to 20 MW and have a maximum speed of 154 rpm. (Rated speed of 0-145 rpm.)

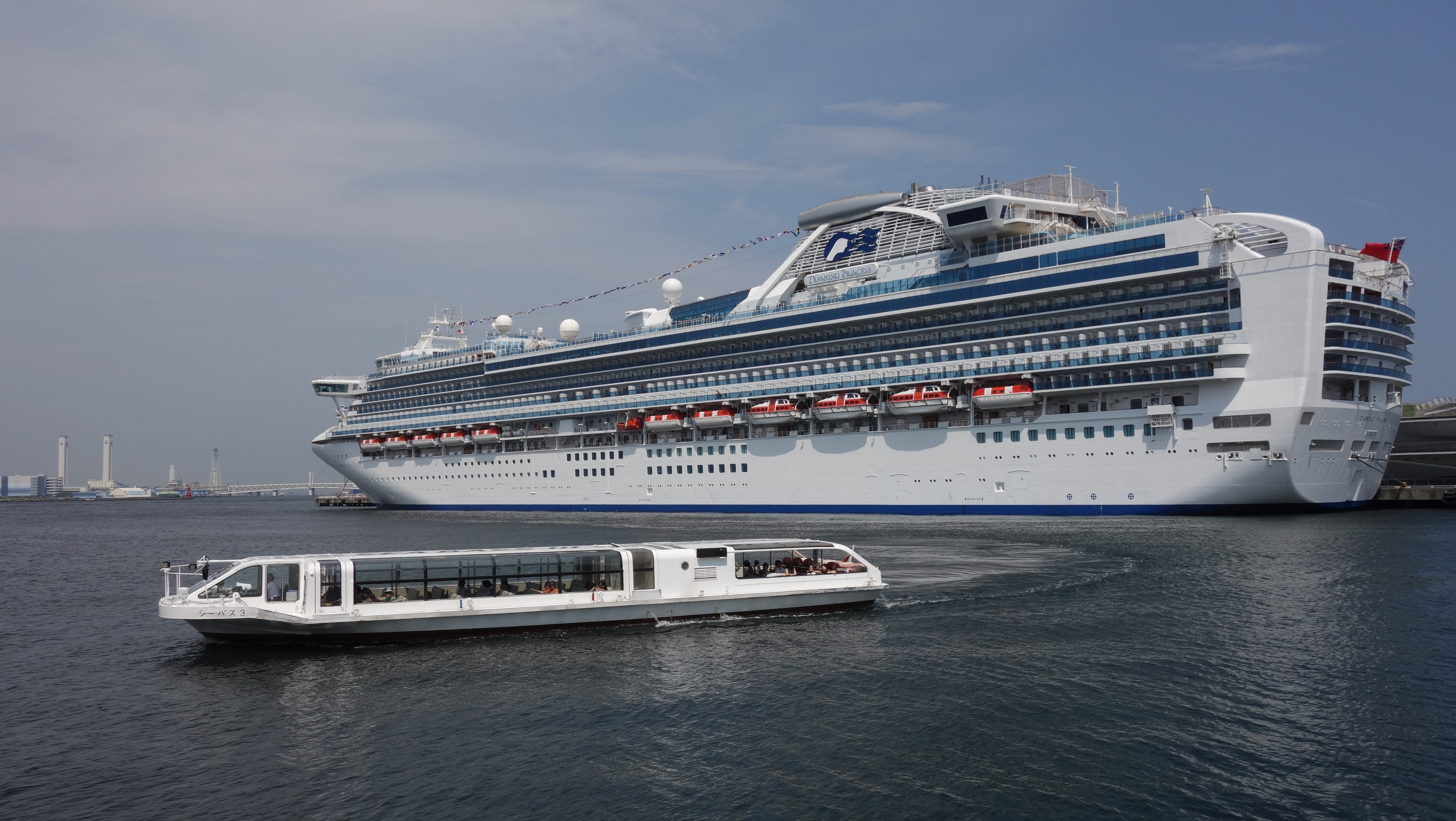
Diamond Princess docked in Yokohama on June 20, 2014.

In June 2017 Diamond Princess was retrofitted with a hull air lubrication system to reduce fuel consumption and related CO_{2} emissions.

== Construction and career ==
Diamond Princess was built in Japan by Mitsubishi Heavy Industries, the first Princess Cruises ship to be built in a Japanese shipyard. Her only sister ship is Sapphire Princess, with whom she swapped names during construction. She and her sister ship were the largest cruise ships to be built by Mitsubishi since the Crystal Harmony in 1991.

The ship was originally intended to be christened Sapphire Princess. However, construction of another ship – the one intended to be Diamond Princess (currently sailing as Sapphire Princess) – was delayed when fire swept through her decks during construction. Because completion of the damaged ship would be delayed for some time, her sister ship, which was also under construction, was renamed Diamond Princess. The name swap helped keep the delivery of Diamond Princess on time. Due to the fire and name swap, both vessels would be the last Carnival Corporation & plc vessels built by Mitsubishi until the completion of AIDAprima in 2016.

She was the first Princess Cruises ship to be built in a Japanese shipyard, and the first to forgo the controversial "wing" or "shopping cart handle" structure overhanging the stern, which houses the Skywalkers Nightclub on Caribbean Princess, Golden Princess and Star Princess, and which was originally also a feature of Grand Princess prior to her 2011 refit.

Prior to 2014, Diamond Princess alternated sailing north and southbound voyages of the glacier cruises during the northern summer months and in the southern summer, she sailed from Australia and New Zealand. Starting in 2014, she undertook cruises from Yokohama for Tokyo or Kobe in the northern summer season.

For the 2016–17 season, she sailed round-trip cruises in the northern winter months from Singapore. Kota Kinabalu was added as part of her destination along with Vietnamese port of Nha Trang in December 2016. She resumed voyaging from Sydney for the 2017–18 season.

After the 2018 Australia and New Zealand cruises, Diamond Princess was re-positioned into South-East Asia for most of 2018, varying between Japan, South Korea, Singapore, Vietnam, Taiwan and Malaysia.

=== 2016 gastroenteritis cases ===
In February 2016, Diamond Princess experienced a gastroenteritis outbreak, caused by norovirus sickening 158 passengers and crew on board, as confirmed after arrival in Sydney by NSW Health.

=== Coronavirus disease 2019 ===
On 20 January 2020, an 80-year-old passenger from Hong Kong embarked in Yokohama, sailed one segment of the itinerary, and disembarked in Hong Kong on 25 January. He visited a local Hong Kong hospital, six days after leaving the ship, where he later tested positive for COVID-19 on 1 February. On its next voyage, 4 February, the ship was in Japanese waters when 10 passengers were diagnosed with COVID-19 during the early stages of the COVID-19 pandemic.

The ship was quarantined on 4 February in the Port of Yokohama in Japan. The infected included at least 138 from India (including 132 crew and 6 passengers), 35 Filipinos, 32 Canadians, 24 Australians, 13 Americans, 4 Indonesians, 4 Malaysians, and 2 Britons. Home countries arranged to evacuate their citizens and quarantine them further in their own countries. As of 1 March, all on board including the crew and the Italian captain Gennaro Arma had disembarked.

As of 16 March, at least 712 out of the 3,711 passengers and crew had tested positive for the virus. As of 14 April, fourteen of those who were on board had died from the disease. On 30 March, the ship was cleared to sail again after the ship was cleaned and disinfected.

On 16 May, Diamond Princess departed from the Port of Yokohama. Japan ended up paying 94% of the medical expenses incurred by the Diamond Princess passengers. All cruises throughout 2020 remained cancelled and as of March 2021 the ship was bunkering in Malaysia and the outer port limit (OPL) area of Singapore Port.

Quarantine!, a book written by passenger Gay Courter on her experience on board the quarantined vessel, was released in November 2020. The HBO documentary The Last Cruise tells the story of the voyage.

=== Post-pandemic return to service ===
After the lay-up induced by the COVID-19, Diamond Princess was announced as returning to service in August 2022. However, the first three months of scheduled cruises had to be cancelled due to staffing issues.

Diamond Princess officially returned to service in November 2022.
