= Working Woman (magazine) =

American magazine

- Categories: Women's magazine
- Frequency: Monthly
- First issue: November 1976
- Final issue: September 2001
- Country: United States
- Based in: New York City
- Language: English
- ISSN: 0145-5761

Working Woman was an American magazine that ceased publication in September 2001 after 25 years.

== History and profile ==
Working Woman was first published in November 1976. The magazine was acquired by Lang Communications in 1978. It was published on a monthly basis. The magazine and its sister publication Working Mother were sold to MacDonald led by Jay MacDonald in 1996. The magazine were later published by Delia Passi Smalter. As its name implies, the magazine targeted working women, unlike traditional women's magazines which focused on women's roles as wives and mothers, or on fashion.
