= Gay, Russia =

Gay (Russian: Гай) is the name of several inhabited localities in Russia.

== Urban localities ==
- Gay, Orenburg Oblast, a town in Orenburg Oblast

== Rural localities ==
- Gay, Samara Oblast, a settlement in Bolsheglushitsky District of Samara Oblast
- Gay, Udmurt Republic, a village in Kyyludsky Selsoviet of Uvinsky District of the Udmurt Republic
