= Johannes Opdam =

Dutch murderer

John Opdam
- Born: 30 October 1916; Surabaja, Dutch East Indies
- Died: 14 October 1983 (aged 66); Leiden, Netherlands
- Occupation: Physician
- Spouse: Arnolda van Eyl
- Status: Deceased
- Criminal charges: Murder (twice)
- Penalty: Life imprisonment (double)

Johannes Franciscus Alphonsus Marinus (John) Opdam (1916-1983) was a Dutch murderer.

== Early life ==
Opdam was born in October 1916 in Surabaya, Dutch East Indies. In 1936, he moved to the Netherlands. There he studied medicine and married Arnolda van Eyl, a teacher's daughter.

== First murder ==
During his wife's vacation in 1951, Opdam had an affair with the couple's maid, Nellie. Mrs. Opdam found out, but being a devoted Catholic, there was never any question of a divorce. Instead, Nellie was sacked. This did not stop Opdam from continuing his affair with the girl. In 1952, Mrs. Opdam's health declined steadily until she died on 24 September. Doctor Opdam claimed it was a brain tumor, but the colleague who performed the post-mortem disagreed and gave the cause of death as 'unknown'. Police were called to the case and a second examination of the body revealed Mrs. Opdam's body contained prussic acid. Johannes Opdam was arrested. During his trial, he at one point even accused his mother-in-law of committing the murder.

== Prison, second murder ==
On 8 June 1954 Opdam was sentenced to life in prison. In the prison in Leeuwarden Opdam met Arie Lodder, who was also convicted for killing his wife. They agreed upon writing notes confessing to the murders committed by each other, to be used when one of them would die. In February 1958, Arie Lodder was found dead in his cell, which was next to that of Doctor Opdam's. Lodder too had been poisoned with prussic acid and on his body a note was found that he had taken a medicine Doctor Opdam had given him. In the meanwhile, both Doctor Opdam and the prison director had received a letter from Lodder, claiming that it was Lodder who had killed Mrs. Opdam.

Opdam had obtained the chemicals to poison Lodder from his cousin-in-law. It is also possible that Lodder's parents had the poison delivered to the prison in Leeuwarden, thinking it was a medicine for their son. The letters and the trick did not set Opdam free, however. On the contrary, in 1961, he was again sentenced to life in prison, this time for the murder of Arie Lodder. He remains the only person in Dutch judicial history to have been sentenced twice to life in prison for two different murders.
