= Gay (surname) =

Gay is a surname. Notable people with the surname include:

- Adelaide Gay (born 1989), American soccer goalkeeper
- Al Gay (1928–2013), British jazz tenor saxophonist
- Alberta Gay (1913–1987), American domestic worker, mother of Marvin Gaye
- Amandine Gay (born 1984), French-African feminist, film maker, and actress
- Andrew Gay (born 1989), Australian rugby league footballer
- Antoine Gay (1790–1871), Frenchman believed to have been possessed by a demon named Isacaron
- Arnold Gay (born 1967), Singaporean TV and radio presenter
- Aurélien Gay (born 2000), Swiss ski mountaineer
- Benjamin Gay (1980–2024), American football running back
- Betsy Gay (1929–2025), American actress and yodeller
- Betty Gay, American politician
- Bill Gay (1927–2008), professional American football player
- Blenda Gay (1950–1976), defensive end in the National Football League
- Bram Gay (1930–2019), trumpet player and brass band enthusiast
- Brian Gay (born 1971), American golfer
- Byron Gay (1886–1945), American songwriter
- Carlos Gay (born 1952), Argentine football goalkeeper
- Cesc Gay (born 1967), movie director
- Charles R. Gay (1875–1946), American banker and president of the New York Stock Exchange
- Charlotte Evelyn Gay (1867–1958), English social and temperance reformer
- Chet Gay (1900–1978), American football player
- Christopher Daniel Gay (born 1974), American habitual car thief
- Claude Gay (1800–1873), French botanist
- Claudine Gay (born 1970), American political scientist and 30th president of Harvard University
- Connie B. Gay (1914–1989), American country music promoter
- D. J. Gay (born 1989), retired American professional basketball player
- Dale Pickett Gay (1891–1988), Wyoming clubwoman in the oil business
- Danny Gay (disambiguation), various people
- David Gay (disambiguation), various people
- Désirée Gay (1810–1891), French socialist feminist
- Duncan Gay (born 1950), an Australian politician
- Earl C. Gay (1902–1972) was a registered pharmacist, member of the Los Angeles City Council
- Edward Gay (disambiguation), several people
- Edwin Francis Gay (1867–1946), American economist
- E. Jane Gay (1830–1919), American woman who devoted her life to social reform and photography
- Éric Gay (born 1958), French politician in New Caledonia
- Everett Gay (born 1964), former American football wide receiver
- Federico Gay (disambiguation), various people
- Francisque Gay (1885–1963), French editor, politician and diplomat
- Françoise Gay (born 1945), Swiss alpine skier
- Frank William Gay (1920–2007), American executive who oversaw several entities for Howard Hughes
- Frederick Parker Gay (1874–1939), American bacteriologist who combated typhoid fever and leprosy
- Geneva Gay, American academic and author
- Geoff Gay (born 1957), English former professional footballer
- George Gay (disambiguation), various people
- Georges Gay (1926–1997), French professional racing cyclist
- Gerald Gay (born 1956), American politician
- Git Gay (1921–2007), Swedish revue director, actress, and singer
- Greg Gay (born 1952), American politician
- Heather Gay (born 1974), American television personality
- Henry M. Gay, one of three founders of Triad Systems Corporation, now known as Activant
- Hobart R. Gay (1894–1983), American general
- Jacques Etienne Gay (1786–1864) French botanist
- Jacques Gay (1851–1925), French painter
- Jamal Gay (born 1989), soccer player from Trinidad and Tobago
- Jason Gay (born 1972), birth name of Christian singer-songwriter Jason Gray; made many recordings as Jason Gay before changing his name to Gray
- Jean Baptiste Gay, vicomte de Martignac (1778–1832), French statesman
- Jennifer Gay (born 1935), on-screen BBC Children's TV continuity announcer
- Jesús Bal y Gay (1905–1993), Spanish composer, music critic, and musicologist
- Joey Gay (born 1971), American actor and comedian
- John Gay (1685–1732), English dramatist
- John Gay (disambiguation), various people
- Jonathan Gay (born 1967), inventor of Macromedia Flash
- Jordan Gay (born 1990), American football kickoff specialist
- José Aurelio Gay (born 1965), Spanish football player and manager
- José María Pérez Gay (1944–2013), Mexican academic, writer, translator and diplomat
- Joseph Louis Gay-Lussac (1778–1850), French physicist
- Jotham Gay (1733–1802), army officer, political figure in Nova Scotia
- Leslie Gay (1871–1949), English cricketer and footballer
- Ludwig Gay, later Ljudevit Gaj (1809–1872), Croatian linguist, politician, journalist and writer
- Mabel Gay (born 1983), Cuban triple jumper
- Madam Gay (1978–1983), British Thoroughbred racehorse
- Maddi Gay (born 1996), Australian rules footballer
- Maria Gay (1879–1943), Catalan opera singer
- Marie-Louise Gay (born 1952), Canadian children's writer and illustrator
- Martin Gay (1726–1809), metal smith and political figure in Nova Scotia
- Marvin Gay Sr. (1914–1998), American minister of the House of God
- Mary Ann Harris Gay (1829–1918), American writer of Life in Dixie During the War
- Matt Gay (born 1994), American football player
- Michel Gay (born 1947), French illustrator and author of children's books
- Nikolai Ge or Gay (1831–1894), Russian painter
- Noel Gay (1898–1954), English composer of popular music
- Pamela L. Gay (born 1973), American astronomer, educator, podcaster, writer
- Patrice Gay (born 1973), French former racing driver
- Patrick Gay (1815–1866), emigrated to South Australia aboard James Fernie in 1854
- Paul Gay (born 1968), French opera singer
- Peter Gay (1923–2015), German-born U.S. historian
- Ramón Gay (1917–1960), Mexican film actor
- Randall Gay (born 1982), American football player
- Randy Gay (born 1958), American serial killer
- Richard Gay (disambiguation), various people
- Robert Gay (disambiguation), various people
- Ross Gay (born 1974), American poet and professor
- Roxane Gay (born 1974), American writer, professor, editor, and commentator
- Rudy Gay (born 1986), American professional basketball player
- Ruth Gay (1922–2006), Jewish writer
- Samuel Gay (1754–1847), judge and political figure in New Brunswick
- Sophie Gay (1776–1852), French author who was born in Paris
- Spirus Gay (1865–1938), French anarchist and acrobat born in Paris
- Steve Gay (born 1947), former U.S. collegiate soccer player
- Susan Elizabeth Gay (1845–1918), chronicler of the history of Old Falmouth
- Sydney Howard Gay (1814–1888), American attorney, journalist and abolitionist
- Terry Gay (born 1947), former Australian rules footballer
- Thomas Gay (1884–1953), intelligence officer
- Thomas Gay (MP) (1378–1390), English politician
- Tim Gay (born 1964), politician in the U.S. state of Nebraska
- Titus Gay (1787–1837), born into slavery and freed in 1812
- Tyson Gay (born 1982), American sprinter
- Virginia Gay (born 1981), Australian actress
- Walter Gay (1856–1937), American artist
- William Gay (disambiguation), various people
- Winckworth Allan Gay (1821–1910), American landscape artist

== See also ==
- Enola Gay, name of airplane that dropped the first atomic bomb on Japan in 1945, named for Paul Tibbets' mother
- Gaye (disambiguation)
