= Fasching (surname) =

Fasching is a surname. Notable people with the surname include:

- Andreas Fasching (born 1981), Austrian former professional tennis player
- Benjamin Fasching (born 1988), Austrian darts player
- Bernd Fasching (born 1955), Austrian painter and sculptor
- Gary Fasching, an American football coach
- Heinrich Fasching (1929-2014), Austrian Roman Catholic bishop
- Hudson Fasching (born 1995), American ice hockey player in NHL
- Kenneth Fasching-Varner (born 1979), professor of Education
- Wolfgang Fasching (born 1967), American cyclist, mountaineer, author and motivational speaker

== See also ==
- Fasch
