= Culturally relevant teaching =

Pedagogy

Culturally relevant teaching, also known as culturally appropriate, culturally congruent, culturally responsive, or culturally compatible teaching, is instruction that uses student culture to aid instruction. Rather than expecting to African-American students to assimilate to a school culture, it treats student culture as a strength that can help them succeed in critical thinking and work for social change.

Culturally responsive teaching was initially discussed for African American students in the United States in primary and secondary school. However, further research has focused on other racial and ethnic backgrounds, other countries, and other age groups.

== Historical context ==
Culturally relevant teaching was made popular by Dr. Gloria Ladson-Billings in the early 1990s. She based her theories on observing students who were particularly effective at teaching African-American students, identified by parents and teachers based both on student achievement and on attitudinal measures. It urges collective action grounded in cultural understanding, experiences, and ways of knowing the world.

Her work was built on a larger body of knowledge on multicultural education and helping culturally diverse students excel in education. Researchers argue that there are gaps in academic achievement between mainstream culture and immigrants or ethnic cultural groups. Early theories suggested that the disconnect between these groups were due to student/teacher language difficulties or that ethnic cultures did not value education as heavily as the Western culture does. This often led to educators unnecessarily placing culturally diverse students in special education classes because of linguistic and cultural differences. In response to these challenges, researchers and teachers began to argue that education should be adapted to "match the cultures students bring with them from home".

Many of these researchers and educators support the constructivist theories of education because such perspectives recognize the value of multiple cultural viewpoints. In constructivism, learners are taught to question, challenge, and critically analyze information rather than blindly accept what it taught; which leads to exactly the type of teaching advocated by the originators of culturally relevant teaching.

Geneva Gay contributed significantly to the progression of culturally relevant teaching in her landmark book, Culturally Responsive Teaching: Theory, Research, and Practice. She wrote about the ways in which culture contributed to students' thoughts, beliefs, and behavior.

Django Paris furthered this work in 2012 by introducing the term "culturally sustaining pedagogy". He proposed that not only do educators need to teach course content in a way that is relevant to students cultural context, educators need to sustain the cultures of their student's communities. His aim was for educators to see diverse languages and cultures as an asset in the classroom instead of an obstacle that students needed to overcome to be successful. In subsequent essays, Paris along with H. Samy Alim, acknowledge the groundbreaking work of Ladson-Billings while outlining the need to continue to develop her work. They propose it is insufficient to incorporate diverse cultures into classrooms while assuming current dominant cultures will remain the same. Ladson-Billings agreed with this direction and deemed it necessary to continue to expand on her original works. Since culture is constantly changing and evolving, research and best practices will continue to change and build upon previous work as well.

== Characteristics ==
A number of authors, including Gay and Lipman, have identified characteristics of culturally responsive teaching. These characteristics are:

1. Validating and affirming: Culturally responsive teaching is validating and affirming because it acknowledges the strengths of students' diverse heritages.
2. Comprehensive: Culturally responsive teaching is comprehensive because it uses "cultural resources to teach knowledge, skills, values, and attitudes".
3. Multidimensional: Culturally responsive teaching encompasses many areas and applies multicultural theory to the classroom environment, teaching methods, and evaluation.
4. Liberating: Culturally responsive teachers liberate students.
5. Empowering: Culturally responsive teaching empower students, giving them opportunities to excel in the classroom and beyond. "Empowerment translates into academic competence, personal confidence, courage, and the will to act".
6. Transformative: Culturally responsive teaching is transformative because educators and their students must often defy educational traditions and the status quo.

In the context of British university business schools, in 2013, Jabbar and Hardaker proposed a five-pillar framework that is designed to support academics in understanding the pertinent aspects of developing pedagogy for students from culturally and ethnically diverse backgrounds in UK higher education.

== Associated teaching practices ==
=== General teaching practices ===
- Creating an accommodating and inviting classroom culture to reach diverse audiences by demonstrating care for students and their cultural needs. A teacher's genuine attitude of interest is thought to yield positive emotions that empower and motivate students.
- Being attentive to the "symbolic curriculum," or visuals displayed in the classroom by ensuring "that they represent a wide variety of age, gender, time, place, social class, and positional diversity within and across ethnic groups."
- Using reciprocal teaching, where students and teachers take turns leading class discussions, as a way to elevate students' voices. When classroom teachers act as facilitators rather than "directors", students are thought to become autonomous in their own learning and feel more empowered. According to constructivist and progressive educators, reciprocal teaching is very important because it gives students the opportunity to express the course material from their cultural viewpoints.
- Using cooperative learning methods to encourage collaboration rather than competitiveness in the completion of assignments has been found to effectively promote culturally relevant learning. Cooperative groups working together towards common goals can learn important skills such as teamwork, and embracing other learning styles.
- Playing collaborative games and engaging in cross-cultural activities to allow students personal interaction with different cultures. For instance, in the three-hour game, "Ba Fa Ba Fa", students participate in one of two very different cultures and must learn the languages and customs of that cultural group. Similar to this activity, is the program "Tribes" implemented into many elementary classrooms, to help students understand their school and classroom as unique and diverse communities.
- Inviting diverse families to visit classrooms allows students to see and learn about differences.
- Researching family history through interviews with family members can help individuals connect with familial cultural influences on their lives. Documenting these interviews through reflective writing can assist them in engaging in meta-reflections as they explore their beliefs and cultural assumptions about themselves and others. Writing about one's own cultural identity and its relationship to their educational experiences or about a different culture learned from a peer has been shown to enhance student engagement.
- Embracing diversity in teaching in all classes and schools, regardless of the population.
- Incorporating authentic world assignments where students confront cultural issues may foster cultural appreciation and also enhance problem-solving skills.

=== Discipline specific teaching practices ===
- In history classes, comparing and contrasting modern and historical viewpoints. Throughout history and in the modern world, family and household composition, housing, and food traditions have varied across cultures, socioeconomic groups, and ethnicities. Research suggests that by introducing these social history themes or other relevant topics in a historical context, discussion and critical analysis can take place on three levels: students compare and contrast human experiences in their own lives and experience, in the wider modern culture, and in the past.
- In social science classes such as sociology or anthropology, examining how different races, ethnicities, and socio-economic groups in the past and present define appropriate behavior, such as manners, etiquette, or what is considered polite behavior. Exploring how gender influences expectations for polite behavior across different cultures. Resources suggest social history lessons provide students an opportunity to connect history with their own cultural experiences.
- Remaining cognizant of the "tourist approach" when developing a culturally competent curriculum. Culturally responsive teaching should go beyond lessons around indigenous peoples only during Thanksgiving or Latinos during Cinco de Mayo.
- Recognizing the need for cultural authenticity and cross-cultural understanding, Professor Jonda C. McNair suggests that pairing historical and contemporary grade middle-novels could help students understand how history shaped the world of today.
- In math classes, including everyday language that reflects the cultural backgrounds of the community to explain and define concepts or overly technical language. Studies also suggest students will benefit from learning about the mathematical contributions made by people from different cultures.
- Providing pre-service teachers with supplemental curriculum materials when textbooks leave out culturally relevant lessons, such as math textbooks that have traditionally lacked diversity in content. Although many teachers consider the subject "culturally void", there are resources that can help educators prepare culturally responsive mathematics activities.

=== Additional strategies ===
- Using literacy and children's books with characters of different backgrounds in the classroom.
- Knowing, understanding, and working with families that come from different race and ethnicities .
- Exposing children to role models.
- Creating a positive learning environment: attentive skills, teaching skills, and teacher/student interaction.
- Starting multi-cultural education to students at an early age.
- Utilizing a diverse curriculum.
- Utilizing student's cultures to help them learn the subjects and skills taught in school.
- Setting high expectations for students of all cultural backgrounds.

== Maintaining relationships ==
Gloria Ladson-Billings has several research projects and articles where she interviewed educators at diverse schools. She mainly focused on low socioeconomic schools. After identifying several exceptional teachers in public schools in low-socioeconomic, mostly African American school districts, Ladson-Billings spent time observing and trying to explain their success with students who are typically pushed to the margins by public education, finding that all of the teachers shared pride in and commitment to their profession and had an underlying belief that all children could be successful. The participating teachers maintained relationships with their students that were "fluid and equitable" and often attended community events in order to demonstrate support for their students. These teachers also believed in creating bonds with students and developing a "community of learners," which means that all students worked collaboratively to become responsible for each other's learning. Ladson-Billings maintains that in order for teachers to use culturally relevant pedagogy successfully, they must also show respect for students and "understand the need for the students to operate in the dual worlds of their home community and the white community".

There have been many studies done in response to how students respond to teachers that exhibit the above characteristics, incorporating the principles and use of these strategies within the classroom. For instance, Tyrone C. Howard looked at the "perceptions and interpretations" of students who have experienced this type of learning environment. The qualitative data which included students response, is evidence that this is a positive and effective form of pedagogy.

== Challenges to culturally relevant teaching ==
Culturally relevant teaching (CRT) has become a growing area of focus in education, but its implementation faces challenges. Indeed, there are many practical challenges to implementing culturally relevant pedagogy including a lack of enforcement of culturally relevant teaching methods, and the tendency to view students as individual units only, rather than seeing them as linked inseparably with their cultural groups. In culturally relevant pedagogy, new teachers must be taught how to adapt their curriculum, methodology, teaching methods, and instructional materials to connect with students' values and cultural norms. Therefore, another challenge for educators is to prepare reflective practitioners who can connect with diverse students and their families. Even though some schools of education acknowledge credibility in training culturally relevant educators, many wrestle with how fit such training into their program and "grudgingly add a diversity course to their curriculum". One contributor to this reluctance comes from the education professors' discomfort with or fear of addressing issues such as racism in their courses. The student population of America's classrooms has changed. Based on data from the National Center for Education Statistics in 2021, 54% of students enrolled in prekindergarten through grade 12 come from racially and ethnically diverse backgrounds. Hispanic students account for 28% of the students enrolled and 45% of students enrolled in prekindergarten through grade 12 are white, falling from 61% in the 1993–94 school year. Given these demographics, Kenneth Fasching-Varner and Vanessa Dodo-Seriki have suggested that disconnects in teacher and student identity lead to "Free and Reduced Pedagogy", or a non-student first approach that reduces students to cultural differences, discrediting students based on their identities and differences in identities between teachers and students. In the largest school districts, half or more of the students are non-white. Demographic projections predict that cultural and ethnic diversity will increase.

One of the early challenges to CRP was that the lack of recognition for a distinct African-American culture.

== Examples of culturally relevant teaching programs ==
Advancement Via Individual Determination (AVID) is a program from the San Diego (California) public schools that helps under-represented students (including those from different cultural groups) by mixing low-achieving students with high-achieving students in college preparation programs. "AVID employs many principles of cooperative learning in its 'writing, inquiry, and collaboration' approach to curriculum and instruction".

The Umoja Community is a California-based group that roots itself in the principles and practices of culturally relevant teaching. Umoja works with students, colleges and the community to promote awareness, instill values and provide the foundations needed to achieve success, particularly for African American students, although it is committed to helping all students. The Umoja Community is recognized by the California Community Colleges System Board of Directors and helps serve over 2,000 students a year.

The Russian Mission School in Alaska incorporates Native American culture with the standard curriculum and emphasizes hands-on activities that are relevant to their local lifestyle.

In The Dreamkeepers: Successful Teachers of African American Children, Gloria Ladson-Billings presents several examples of excellent culturally relevant teaching in African American classrooms.

== See also ==
- Baseball Study, academic experiment that tested how reading comprehension is impacted by prior knowledge
- Funds of knowledge
