= Gayre =

Gayre is a surname. Notable people with the surname include:

- Robert Gayre (1907–1996), Scottish anthropologist
- Clan Gayre
- John Gayre (disambiguation), multiple people

== See also ==
- Gayer
