= Cultural dissonance =

Sense of discord caused by a change in a cultural environment

In sociology and cultural studies, cultural dissonance is a sense of discord, disharmony, confusion, or conflict experienced by people in the midst of change in their cultural environment. The changes are often unexpected, unexplained or not understandable due to various types of cultural dynamics.

Studies into cultural dissonance take on a wide socio-cultural scope of analysis that inquire into economics, politics, values, learning styles, cultural factors, such as language, tradition, ethnicity, cultural heritage, cultural history, educational formats, classroom design, and even socio-cultural issues such as ethnocentrism, racism and their respective historical legacies in the cultures.

== Research ==
Research topics in cultural dissonance tend to be interdisciplinary drawing from a wide range of disciplines and applying the findings to equally diverse fields and industries.

=== Education ===
Winifred L. Macdonald concluded in her thesis that, "... shared markers of language and ethnicity were not sufficient to ensure that the cultural differences in education systems were not experienced by the families." Macdonald also observed that cultural dissonance is sometimes said to inhibit socio-cultural adaptation.

Susan Black, an education research consultant, wrote an article in the American School Board Journal of the National School Board Association that summarized some of the actions recommended by some researchers in education-related cultural dissonance. The recommendations for educators included:

1. Recognize ethnocentrism
2. Know and understand the student's cultural heritage
3. Understand social, economic and political issues and values in different cultures
4. Adopt the attitude that students—all students—can learn
5. Create genuinely caring classrooms where all students are appreciated and accepted.

Other general findings include:

- Geneva Gay (University of Washington in Seattle, Washington), proposed that differences can erupt into cultural clashes
- Researchers at the Northwest Regional Educational Laboratory notes that many anecdotal case studies show how culturally responsive practices improve students' behavior and achievement.

=== Second-generation immigrants ===
In their book Children of Immigration, Carola and Marcelo Suárez-Orozco discuss dissonance as it relates to Latinos in the United States. Suarez Orozco found that second-generation Hispanics face more acute forms of cultural dissonance than their first generation parents. They also noticed that second-generation individuals also face "special difficulties" that lead to "three general patterns of adjustment"

1. attempts to synthesize two cultural traditions
2. passing as a member of the dominant group
3. developing of defensive identity such as gang membership

=== Refugees of war ===
Suárez-Orozco also compared the experience of exiles from Cuba being reunited with family members with the "...alienated refugees from war-torn Central America..." as they worked through their own adjustment issues, and concluded that Central Americans had to deal with more cultural dissonance than their Cuban counterparts.

=== Law enforcement ===
Larry A. Gould wrote a paper for Northern Arizona University:

his research reports on the link between feelings of spirituality & how Navajo police officers tend to enforce European-based law. Previous research suggests that a link exists between the officers' depth of feeling of spirituality & the officers' attitude toward the effectiveness traditional methods of social control; however, this research goes a step further & examines the impact of cultural dissonance on the stressors faced by Navajo police officers. The enforcement behavior of the Navajo officers was used as a proxy for the intensity of their feelings concerning the usefulness of traditional vs European-based forces of social control; the underlying assumption being tested is that self-determination is not only a state of law but a state of psychological being. A snowball method of sample development was used to select officers for intensive interviews. The findings suggest that the officers' feeling of spiritual connectedness to his/her culture is inversely related to the strictness of the enforcement of European-based laws. In other words, the more spiritual the officer, the less likely the officer is to rely solely on European-based laws, & the greater the reliance on other methods of problems solving. The finding also suggest that in addition to the stressors normally encounter by all police officers, Navajo officers faced additional stressors that are specific to indigenous officers policing in indigenous communities.

— Gould

=== In sports ===
Tracy Taylor wrote a paper for the Journal of Sport and Social Issues. In it she wrote:

...This research investigates issues of cultural diversity & inclusiveness in women's netball in Australia using the rhetoric of exclusion. Women & girls from culturally diverse backgrounds spoke of reinforced difference & cultural assimilation in their netball experiences. Women born in other English-speaking countries recalled feelings of inclusion & limited cultural dissonance & indicated that netball helped them feel as part of their new community & gain social capital via participation. Although experiences of explicit exclusion or racial discrimination were virtually nonreported, some women felt a strong sense of cultural conformity to Anglo-centric expectations of behavior. The women's stories & experiences suggest that women from culturally diverse backgrounds have found few opportunities to express their cultural distinctiveness through mainstream Australian sports such as netball. The conclusion reached after this examination is that the rhetoric of exclusion is pervasive in Australian netball & unlikely to change in the near future.

— Taylor

== Cultural dissonance in popular culture ==
Side 2 of the Firesign Theatre's 1968 album, Waiting for the Electrician or Someone Like Him, features a humorous 18-minute radio drama of a traveler experiencing cultural dissonance on his arrival in a foreign country. For example, the traveler struggles to communicate his wish to send a telegram, only to be informed that yes, his telegram has been sent, at considerable cost, and that he will be receiving it in about an hour.

== See also ==
- Anomie
- Cognitive dissonance
- Culture
- Culture shock
- Propaganda
  - Gaslighting
