= Fasch =

Fasch is a surname. Notable people with the surname include:

- Carl Friedrich Christian Fasch (1736–1800), German composer and harpsichordist, son of Johann
- Johann Friedrich Fasch (1688–1758), German violinist and composer

== See also ==
- Fasching (surname)
