= Kingsmill Key =

English cricketer

Sir Kingsmill James Key, 4th Bt.
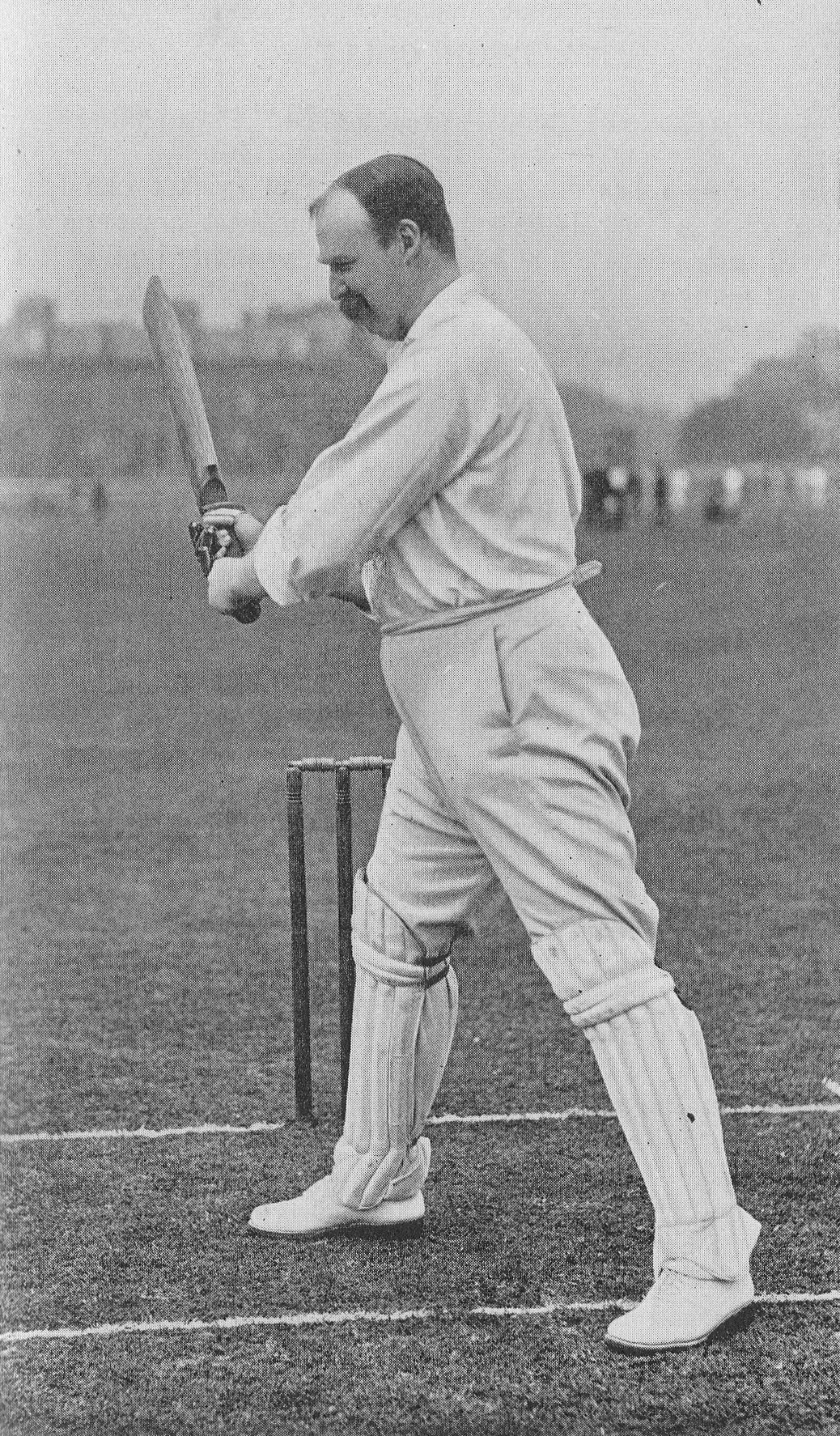

Cricket information
- Batting: Right-handed
- Bowling: Right arm off-break

Career statistics
| Competition | First-class |
|---|---|
| Matches | 368 |
| Runs scored | 13,008 |
| Batting average | 26.22 |
| 100s/50s | 13/60 |
| Top score | 281 |
| Balls bowled | 641 |
| Wickets | 12 |
| Bowling average | 28.08 |
| 5 wickets in innings | 0 |
| 10 wickets in match | 0 |
| Best bowling | 2/32 |
| Catches/stumpings | 113/0 |
- Source: CricketArchive

Sir Kingsmill James Key, 4th Baronet (11 October 1864 – 9 August 1932) was an English cricketer.

== Life and career ==
Key was born in Streatham Common, London. He was educated at Clifton College and Oriel College, Oxford. In the course of a long career he played for, among others, Surrey County Cricket Club (whom he captained for several years in the 1890s), Oxford University, Marylebone Cricket Club (MCC) and the Gentlemen. His highest score of 281, for Oxford against Middlesex at Chiswick Park in 1887, remained the highest first-class score for the university until 2013.

Key married Helen Abercrombie in Baguley, Cheshire, in 1888. They lived in London, where Key was a stockbroker, a member of the London Stock Exchange. He died at the age of 67 in Wittersham, Kent, having contracted blood poisoning after an insect bite. His cousin, Leslie Gay, played one Test match for England. Leslie's sister, Charlotte Evelyn Gay, was an English social and temperance reformer affiliated with the Church Army.

Baronetage of the United Kingdom
| Preceded by John Kingsmill Causton Key | Baronet (of Thornbury and Denmark Hill); 1926–1932 | Extinct |
