= Kenneth Fasching-Varner =

German-American academic

Kenneth J. Fasching-Varner
- Born: Kenneth James Varner; August 22, 1979 (age 46); Birkenfeld, Germany
- Occupation: University professor
- Known for: glocality and teacher education.

Kenneth J. Fasching-Varner (born August 22, 1979) formerly the Shirley B. Barton Endowed Associate Professor of Education at Louisiana State University in Baton Rouge, Louisiana is now Professor of Education at University of Nevada, Las Vegas whose ideas contribute to education and social reform.

Fasching-Varner has over 100 published articles, books, and book chapters, and has contributed to academic discourse through presentations at academic conferences at international, national, and local contexts.

== Early life ==
Fasching-Varner grew up in Rochester, New York, and attended public schools from K–8. Fasching-Varner had the experience of being taught in K–8 by a significant number of Black female educators, whose teaching style and activism made a significant impact on his own teaching. Fasching-Varner was influenced significantly by negative community narratives about the value of urban inner-city students, of which he was one, and has published about the disconnect between teacher identities and student identities and the contribution of negative perspectives to community narratives about students from underrepresented groups.

== Free and reduced pedagogy concept ==
Fasching-Varner, along with colleague Vanessa Dodo-Seriki, has advanced a critique of under-engaged teaching called "free and reduced pedagogy". Fasching-Varner and Dodo-Seriki discuss free and reduced pedagogy as a non-people first style of teaching that reduces, through a teacher's discourse, the value of the student and the teacher's ability to teach the student based on non-controllable demographics. In his own work, Fasching-Vanrer has found that teachers in high-needs areas tend to look across areas of difference as a means of dismissing a student's potential, and has often found students being referred to as "free and reduced lunch students", helping in coining the term "free and reduced pedagogy".

== Culturally responsive pedagogy ==
Working in the traditions of Gloria Ladson-Billings Fasching-Varner's work reflects and engagement with and interest in culturally relevant perspectives and approaches to education. Fasching-Varner has published in the area of culturally relevant pedagogy Fasching-Varner's book publication "Working Through Whiteness" attempts to, in part, understand how teacher narratives reveal preventative gaps from achieving culturally relevant pedagogy.

== Critical race theory and white racial identity ==
Fasching-Varner has an active research agenda centered in critical race theory. While studying with theorist Adrienne Dixson at Ohio State University, Fasching-Varner developed an interest in critical race theory with an emphasis and focus on the manifestation of white racial identity in the narratives of pre-service teachers. Fasching-Varner's work links considerations of critical race theory and culturally responsive pedagogy, with an emphasis on the property value of whiteness. Fasching-Varner has proposed a non-developmental model for racial identity which provides a radically different approach from that proposed by Janet Helms, long considered the authority in white racial identity development. Fasching-Varner's work has received praise from several leading authorities in the fields of multiculturalism, whiteness studies, and culturally relevant teaching. Kevin Kumashiro, president of the National Association of Multicultural Educators, suggests that Fasching-Varner has written an "important new book" in this field. Elaine Richardson, professor of language and literacy at The Ohio State University, encourages people to "read this book. [to] be inspired and informed". A leading authority in culturally responsive teaching, Geneva Gay says of Fasching-Varner's work that "This is a must read for White prospective and practicing teachers, as well as teacher educators. Finally, Tim Wise, author of White Like Me: Reflections on Race from a Privileged Son, says of Fasching-Varner's work that "All pre-service teachers should read it, as should anyone who cares about the creation of educational equity in the United States".

== School-to-prison and neoliberal critique ==
Around 2014 Fasching-Varner extended his work to include economic analysis of schools, education, and the prison industrial complexes. Fasching-Varner has extended ideas from critical race theory, particularly racial realism, to work toward explaining the persistent nexus between schools and prisons, articulating that the connection is a natural consequence of neo-liberal economic orientations and policies in the United States. Fasching-Varner has also provided an explicit look at how prisons in Louisiana, namely the Angola prison, operate as modern-day slave plantations and along with schools serve as the misery industries of Louisiana

== Glocality ==
Fasching-Varner began a cultural exchange in 2004 with partner schools in Chile. Through this work he has developed over 250 US pre-service and in-service teachers to develop culturally sustaining practices through this unique partnership where US participants live with host families where only 12-18 year old children speak both English and Spanish while pairing the teachers with a Chilean partner teacher from the host school. Through this endeavor Fasching-Varner has bridged glocality as a concept to the field of education.

== Publications ==
=== Authored books ===
Hayes, C., Fasching-Varner, K. J., Eisworth, H., White-Smith, K. (2018). Through the fire: From intake to credential; teacher candidates share their experiences through narrative. Leiden, NL: Brill.

Martin, L. L., Fasching-Varner, K. J., Hartlep, N. D. (2017). Pay to play: Race and the perils of the college sports industrial complex. Westport, CT: Praeger.

Fasching-Varner, K. J. (2012). Working through whiteness: Examining white racial identity and profession with pre-service teachers. Lanham, MD: Lexington Press.

=== Edited books ===
Fasching-Varner, K. J., Bickmore, S.T., Hays, D. G., Schrader, P.G., Anagostopoulos, D. (Eds.). (2021). The Corona chronicles: Necessary narratives in uncertain times. Volume 1. New York, NY: DIO Press.

Fasching-Varner, K. J., Tobin, K., Lentz, S. (Eds.) (2018). #BRokenPromises, Black deaths, and blue ribbons: Understanding, complicating, and transcending police-community violence. Leiden, NL: Brill.

Clark, C.E., Vandehei, A., Fasching-Varner, K. J., & Haddad, Z. M. (Eds). (2018). Multicultural curriculum transformation in science, technology, engineering, and mathematics. Lanham, MD: Lexington.

Martin, L. L., Fasching-Varner, K. J., Hayward, H. (Eds.) (2017). Race, population studies, and America’s public schools: A critical demography perspective of racial and educational inequity. Lanham, MD: Lexington Press.

Fasching-Varner, K. J., Martin, L. L., Mitchell, R. W., Daneshzadeh, A. (Eds.) (2017). Understanding, dismantling, and disrupting the prison-to-school pipeline. Lanham, MD: Lexington Press.

Martin, L. L., Hayward, H., Fasching-Varner, K. J. (Eds.) (2016). After the storm: Militarization, occupation, and segregation in post-Katrina America. Westport, CT: Praeger.

Fasching-Varner, K. J., Hartlep, N. D., Martin, L. L., Hayes, C., Mitchell, R. W., & *Allen-Mitchell, C. A. (Eds.). (2015). The assault on communities of color: Exploring the realities of race-based violence. Lanham, MD: Rowman and Littlefield.

Fasching-Varner, K. J., Albert, K. A., Mitchell, R. W., & *Allen, C.A. (Eds.) (2015). Racial battle fatigue in higher education: Exposing the myth of post-racial America. Lanham, MD: Rowman and Littlefield.

Fasching-Varner, K. J., Reynolds, R., Albert, K.A., & Martin, L. L. (Eds.) (2014). Trayvon Martin, race, and "American justice:" Writing wrong. Rotterdam, NL: Sense Publishers.

Fasching-Varner, K. J., Eisworth, H. B., Mencer, T. H, *Cho, D. R., Murray, M. C., & *Morton, B. C. (Eds.). (2013). Student teaching: A journey in narrative. Rotterdam, NL: Sense Publishers.

Clark, C. E., Fasching-Varner, K. J., & Brimhall-Vargas, M. (Eds.). (2012). Occupying the academy: Just how important is diversity work in higher education? Lanham, MD: Rowman and Littlefield.

=== Peer-reviewed articles ===
Fasching-Varner, K. J., Desmarchelier, R., Gerlach, D., Wiens, P., Schrader, P. G., Down, B., *Stewart, L., *Stone, M. P., Bagnall, N., Lüke, M. (2020). Thinking and acting across ponds: Glocalized* intersections of trepidation, neoliberalism, and possibilities for 21st century teacher education. International Dialogues on Teaching, 7(1), 113-127.

Fasching-Varner, K. J., *Stone, M. P., Mora Mella, R., Olave Henriques, F., Yacoman Palma, M. (2019). “…4542 miles from home…:” Repositioning English language learners as power brokers and teachers as learners in the study abroad context. Education Sciences, 9(146), 1-13.

Fasching-Varner, K. J., Denny, R. K., *Stewart, L. M, *Stone, M. P., *Albornoz, C. F., Mora, R., Olave, F., Yacoman, M., *Yang, S., & Denny, M. (2018). Love in a “glocal” world: Living and learning to teach through study abroad. Multicultural Perspectives, 20(3), 135-147.

Green, D., *Pulley, T., *Jackson, M., Martin, L. L., & Fasching-Varner, K. J. (2018). Mapping the margins and searching for higher ground: Examining the marginalization of black female graduate students at PWIs. Gender and Education, 30(3), 295-309. [print].

Martin, L. L., & Fasching-Varner, K. J. (2017). Race, residential segregation, and the death of democracy: Education and the myth of post-racialism. Democracy and Education, 25(1), 1-10.

Jackson, M., *Green, D., Martin, L. L., & Fasching-Varner, K. J. (2016). Band-aids don’t fix bullet holes: A response to “We were there too.” Democracy and Education, 24(2), 1-10.

Green, D., *Pulley, T., *Jackson, M., Martin, L. L., & Fasching-Varner, K. J. (2016). Mapping the margins and searching for higher ground: Examining the marginalization of Black female graduate students at PWIs. Gender and Education, 28(6), 1-15.

Seriki, V.D., Brown, C. T., & Fasching-Varner, K. J. (2015). The permanence of racism in teacher education. Teachers College Record, 117(14), 74-102.

Hayes, C. & Fasching-Varner, K. J. (2015). Racism 2.0 and the death of social and cultural foundations of education: A critical conversation. Journal of Educational Foundations, 28(1), 113-130.

Fasching-Varner, K. J., Mitchell, R. W., Martin, L. L., & Bennett-Haron, K. P. (2014). Beyond school-to prison pipeline and toward an educational and penal realism. Equity and Excellence in Education, 47(4), 5-24.

Martin, L. L., Fasching-Varner, K., Quinn, M., & *Jackson, M. (2014). Racism, rodeos, and the misery industries of Louisiana. Journal of Pan African Studies, 7(6), 60-83.

Fasching-Varner, K. J. (2014). “Uhh you know,” don’t you?: White racial bonding in the narratives of white pre-service teachers. The Journal of Educational Foundations, 27(3/4), 21-41.

Lanuax, C., *Vice, K., & Fasching-Varner, K. J. (2014). Center learning in a first-grade classroom. Networks: An Online Journal for Teacher Research, 16(1), 1-10.

Fasching-Varner, K. J., & Mitchell, R. W. (2013). Capturing the moment to debunk the crisis. Journal of Curriculum and Pedagogy, 10(2), 124-127.

Fasching-Varner, K. J., & *Bible, C. (2012). What it means to mentor: One student’s non-traditional story. Insight: A Think College Brief on Policy, Research, & Practice, 11(1), 1-4.

Fasching-Varner, K., & Dodo-Seriki, V. (2012). Moving beyond seeing with our eyes wide shut: A response to “There is no culturally responsive teaching spoken here.” Democracy and Education, 20(1), 1-6.

Rome, M., *Ruiz, M. A., & Fasching-Varner, K. J. (2012). On the road to engagement: Teacher action research and student literacy engagement in socially responsible social studies instruction. Literacy and Social Responsibility, 5, 79-105.

Fasching-Varner, K. J. (2009). No! The team ain’t alright!: The institutional and individual problematics of race. Social Identities: Journal for the Study of Race, Nation, and Culture, 15, 811-829.

Fasching-Varner, K. J. (2006). Pedagogy of respect: The inter-generational influence of Black women. Midwestern Educational Researcher, 19(2), 28-35.
