= Baseball Study =

Educational study on reading comprehension

- Objective: Test effect of prior knowledge on reading comprehension
- Location: Marquette University, Milwaukee
- Project coordinator: Donna Recht, Lauren Leslie
- Participants: 64 seventh and eighth grade students

The Baseball Study (also known as the Baseball Experiment) was an academic experiment that tested how reading comprehension is impacted by prior knowledge. In 1987, education researchers Donna Recht and Lauren Leslie tested middle school students on the topic of baseball, evaluating their results based on the participant's reading abilities and prior knowledge of baseball. They concluded that prior knowledge was just as important as reading proficiency in the student's abilities to comprehend written text.

== Design and implementation ==
In 1987, researchers Donna Recht and Lauren Leslie developed a study to determine how much reading comprehension depended on prior knowledge of a topic. As the study was to be conducted on junior high students, they chose the topic of baseball under the assumption that the kids could potentially be familiar with the sport. Starting with 64 students, the participants were split into four groups based on their reading ability and prior knowledge of baseball. Each student read a half-page of text describing a baseball inning and were then asked to recreate the action on a model baseball field, demonstrating their comprehension of what they had just read.

The study found that the students who were previously familiar with baseball were better able to recreate the described action. According to the researchers: "Students with high reading ability but low knowledge of baseball were no more capable of recall or summarization than were students with low reading ability and low knowledge of baseball." The study also found that the students assessed as 'less proficient' readers were "better at identifying important ideas in the text and at including those ideas in summaries", skills that are considered important for overall reading comprehension. Natalie Wexler, an educational journalist, described the key takeaway as demonstrating that "the bad readers who knew a lot about baseball outperformed the good readers who didn’t".

Recht and Leslie were surprised at the results and reached the conclusion that if "educators want to accelerate student learning, it will be essential to consider students' background knowledge in the planning". They published their research in the Journal of Educational Psychology in 1988.

== Effects ==
The baseball study has been described as "elegant in its simplicity but profound in its implications". The study's findings were praised for revealing that readers with "sufficient background knowledge are able to comprehend and learn more easily because they have multiple ways to store information".

The Northwest Evaluation Association (NWEA) lauded the study for increasing the connection between education and the community "while also dismantling stereotypes and bridging cultural divides". It cites the study's results as a way to assist at-risk students, such as students from historically marginalized groups and low socioeconomic backgrounds, through the use of culturally relevant teaching to improve academic success.

== See also ==
- Culturally relevant teaching
