= David Gay =

David Gay may refer to:

- David Gay (British Army officer) (1920–2010), British Army officer and cricketer
- David Gay (rugby union) (born 1948), English rugby player
- David W. Gay (born 1935), United States Marine Corps general

== See also ==
- David Gaynes, American documentary filmmaker
- Dave Gaynor, former drummer for Girl (band)
