= William Gay =

William Gay or variants may refer to:

== Sportspeople ==
- William Gay (cornerback) (born 1985), American NFL player drafted by the Pittsburgh Steelers in 2007
- William Gay (defensive lineman) (born 1955), retired American NFL player
- Willie Gay (born 1998), American football linebacker
- Willie Gay (baseball) (1909–1970), American baseball player
- Bill Gay (1927–2008), American football defensive back

== Other people ==
- William Gay (author) (1941–2012), American writer of novels and short stories
- William Gay (landscape gardener and surveyor) (1814–1893), British landscape gardener and surveyor
- William Gay (poet) (1865–1897), Scottish-born Australian poet
- Frank William Gay (1920–2007), also known as Bill Gay, American businessman

== See also ==
- William G. Brown Sr. (William Gay Brown Sr., 1800–1884), American politician from Virginia and West Virginia
- William G. Brown Jr. (William Gay Brown Jr., 1856–1916), American politician from West Virginia
