= Atmospheric Science Letters =

- Discipline: Atmospheric science
- Language: English
- Edited by: Massimo Bollasina and Christopher O'Reilly

Publication details
- History: 2000-present
- Publisher: John Wiley & Sons on behalf of the Royal Meteorological Society
- Frequency: Monthly
- Open access: Yes
- Impact factor: 2.415 (2020)

Standard abbreviations
- ISO 4: Atmos. Sci. Lett.

Indexing
- ISSN: 1530-261X
- LCCN: 00213833
- OCLC no.: 700197738

Links
- Journal homepage; Online archive

Atmospheric Science Letters is a monthly peer-reviewed open access scientific journal covering the atmospheric sciences. It was established in 2000 and is published by John Wiley & Sons on behalf of the Royal Meteorological Society, of which it is an official journal. The editors-in-chief are Christopher H. O'Reilly and Massimo Bollasina. According to the Journal Citation Reports, the journal has a 2020 impact factor of 2.415, ranking it 57th out of 94 journals in the category "Meteorology & Atmospheric Sciences". Paul Hardaker is the founding editor.
