= Funds of knowledge =

Funds of knowledge is a model that describes the strategic and cultural resources that minority households have, which children can draw upon in school. These resources include essential knowledge that has been passed down within communities and cultures. It serves as an alternative to a deficiency model that focuses on the weaknesses of these children or the challenges they face.

The use of funds of knowledge was proposed by anthropologists Carlos G. Vélez-Ibáñez and James Greenberg in a 1992 paper about U.S.-Mexican households. They aimed to improve the academic performance of marginalized students, build trust between families and teachers, and modify curriculum to work with students' funds of knowledge.

== In the household ==
Funds of knowledge in the household are exchanged fluidly between family members and their social networks. Children learn skills from many different "teachers," and they also participate in household activities and contribute to household needs. Additionally, children generally choose what they want to learn.

== In the classroom ==
Prevailing views in the field of education in the 1990s minimized the knowledge present in working-class households and instead described them as "disorganized socially and deficient intellectually." Education focused on the cultural codes of the elite and ignored the cultural codes of other social groups. Work based on the funds of knowledge approach attempts to counter this perspective.

A key part of the funds of knowledge approach is that teachers conduct research within households, to learn about the family and labor history of their minority students and what funds of knowledge they have. This allows them to learn about their students' strengths rather than assuming their weaknesses. It also changes the usual power dynamics of education: children and families, rather than teachers, are placed in the position of knowledgeable experts.

== Examples ==
A study of funds of knowledge among Mexican-American families included household funds of knowledge related to agriculture, mining, business, household management, construction, repair, medicine, and religion.

Lew Zipin differentiated between 'dark' and 'light' funds of knowledge, describing dark funds of knowledge as the knowledge that students have about racism, violence, poverty, and other difficult life experiences. Dark funds of knowledge are not supposed to be avoided, but rather understood and engaged with transformatively.

== See also ==
- Bilingual advantage
- Culturally relevant teaching
