= Paul Hardaker =

British mathematician and climate scientist (born 1966)

Professor Paul James Hardaker FInstP, FRMetS, CMet
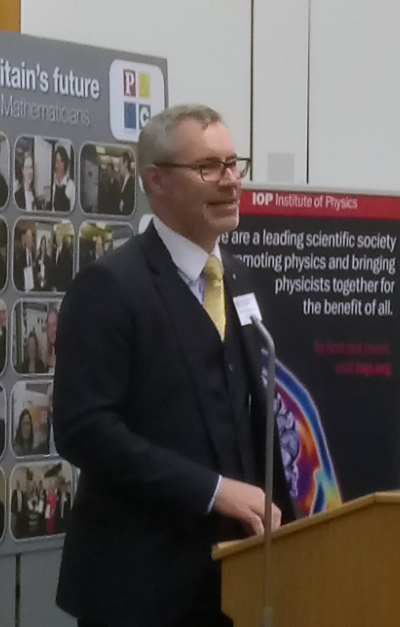
- Hardaker in 2017
- Born: 1966 (age 59–60); England
- Scientific career
- Fields: Mathematics, Meteorology, Physics
- Workplaces: Met Office; Royal Meteorological Society; Institute of Physics
- Thesis: A study of the melting layer in single polarisation radar echoes with application to operational weather radar. (1992)
- Doctoral advisor: Anthony Holt

Paul James Hardaker (born 1966) is a meteorologist.

== Biography ==
Hardaker is chair of the board of Sense about Science and is the former Chief Executive Officer of the Institute of Physics.

Hardaker has a background in mathematics, and completed his PhD in radar meteorology at the University of Essex. He has worked at institutes such as British Telecom Research Labs, the European Space Agency, the Rutherford Appleton Laboratory. He worked at the Met Office for 14 years in a variety of roles including the Met Office's chief adviser to government, providing support to the government in areas such as climate change policy, the civil contingency programme and the UK's Public Met Service, before eventually becoming the first Chief Executive of the Royal Meteorological Society in 2006, until 2012. Hardaker was a founding editor of the Atmospheric Science Letters journal.

Hardaker was chairman of the Natural Environment Research Council and directed the programme on the Flood Risk from Extreme Events (FREE). He holds a visiting professorship at the University of Reading and previously the University of Salford. For five years he was also a non-executive director on the Board of Berkshire West Primary Care Trust and was actively involved with local and regional healthcare initiatives. In 2015 Hardaker was reported to be the 8th highest paid charity CEO in the UK.

Hardaker is also a Fellow of the Institute of Physics (FInstP), Fellow of the Royal Meteorological Society (FRMetS), and Chartered Meteorologist (CMet).
