= Bernd Fasching =

Austrian painter and sculptor

- Born: 18 July 1945; Vienna, Austria
- Died: 15 October 2021 (aged 76); Istria, Croatia
- Occupations: Painter and sculptor

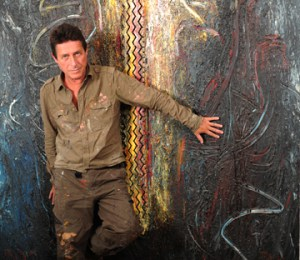
Bernd Fasching in 2012

Bernd Fasching (18 July 1955 – 15 October 2021) was an Austrian painter and sculptor. He lived and worked in Vienna.

== Life and work ==
In 2000 Fasching opened his project Westwerk (a western investigation of the occidental culture) in the more than 800 years old Vienna St. Stephan’s Cathedral. The project consisted of his sculptures, paintings and other work.

A constantly recurring, central element in Fasching’s work is the creation of his pieces of art amidst his visitors and audience. There were 7 periods between 1987 and 2006 when, under the title 12 Tage 12 Nächte/12 Days 12 Nights, Fasching lived and worked in various galleries around the world, where he could be observed at work and was always open to discussions. During this time he did not leave the place of work. Fasching created 12 paintings with themes inspired by the talks with the visitors to his work sessions. For each of the seven stations of the project [Vienna (1987), Amsterdam (1990), Cologne (1991), Zurich (1992), Jerusalem (1994), New York (1997) and finally Vienna again (2006)] a special soundtrack was composed, which was played in the respective gallery for the full 288 hours of the project.

Fasching’s walk-in sculpture Der Hammer des Thors/Thor’s Hammer, created in 1990 in the entrance hall of the Austrian Museum of Applied Arts (Museum für Angewandte Kunst - MAK), also emerged before the eyes of the museum’s visitors, thus enabling them to follow the process of creation. A further walk-in sculpture was created by Bernd Fasching in the Dominican Republic between 1996 and 1997. Terra Nova, the title of this walk-in formation of sculptures, depicts the landing place of Christopher Columbus on the island as an incentive to reflect on the checkered, often terrible History of the American Continents.

Based on these pieces, Fasching created the series Tools, making a sculpture of each of the tools required for sculpturing a monument. A bronze sculpture from this series, in the form of a spade, was revised by Fasching and turned into the Diva Award, an Austrian prize for sensational real-estate projects, which has been awarded annually ever since its creation in 2002, with Bernd Fasching himself as one of the jury members.

== Works/Experimental arrangements in the field of art ==
- Westwerk – Formation in the Vienna St. Stephan’s Cathedral, Austria (2000)
- 12 Days 12 Nights – Vienna, Austria (1987)
- 12 Days 12 Nights – Amsterdam, the Netherlands (1990)
- 12 Days 12 Nights – Cologne, Germany (1991)
- 12 Days 12 Nights – Zurich, Switzerland (1992)
- 12 Days 12 Nights – Jerusalem, Israel (1994)
- 12 Days 12 Nights – New York, USA (1997)
- 12 Days 12 Nights – Vienna, Austria (2006)
- Der Hammer des Thors/Thor’s Hammer – Austrian Museum of Applied Arts (MAK), Vienna, Austria (1990)
- Kopf-Bahnhöfe/Railheads - Vienna, Austria (1993)
- Die Energie-Frage/The Energy-Question -Stuttgart, Germany (1994)
- Terra Nova. Una Formacion Americana – Casa de Campo, Dominican Republic (1996/97)
- The Vienna Pillows
- Heads
- Women/Men Series
- Tools
- Herz Hirten
- Gaza Power Station – Gaza City, Palestine (Realisation postponed for indefinite period of time due to the second intifada)
- Vienna Mirror – the strong and vulnerable heart of democracy – Supplementing the Lueger monument at the Vienna Ringstraße, Austria – Phase 1 (2003), Phase 2 in preparation
- Band Eins/Volume One. Experimental Arrangements in the Field of Art. 9 Examples. German/English (pocket book, Edition Mailoi, Vienna, Austria 1996)
