= Spirus Gay =

French anarchist, unionist, and gymnast

Spirus Gay (1865–1938), born Joseph Jean Auguste Gay, was a French militant anarchist, trade unionist, and gymnast. Gay was a celebrated acrobat, illusionist, and conjurer, and actively participated in the defense of artists' rights through the then-nascent union movement.

== Biography ==
Joseph Jean Auguste Gay was born on 25 October 1865 in Paris. Gay completed a year of military service. He billed himself as the inventor of the rational method of cerebro-corporal education ("méthode rationnelle d'Éducation cèrébro-corporelle"). Gay was associated with fellow anarchists Émile Gravelle and Henri Zisly. An April 1926 bulletin of the 'Society of Friends of the National Natural History Museum and Garden of Plants' listed Gay as living at 10 Cité Riverin in Paris.

Gay founded a gymnasium in Paris in 1903, which he used as a space for pedagogical experimentation, alongside the promotion of vegetarianism and healthy living. Gay treated acrobatics as a political pursuit and saw a connection between the development of a healthy mind and body with the a broader philosophy of resistance. Gay's gymnasium went on to become a site for the promotion of vegetarianism in the early days of the Vegetarian Society of France.

Gay was actively involved in union organising in France during the turn of the century. Gay was a founding member of the Cercle d'Études Sociales des Artistes. Gay was also involved in the founding of the l'Union artistique de la scène, de l'orchestre et du cirque in May 1895, he went on to become the union secretary. In 1897, Gay became the treasurer of the Comité des jeunes défenseurs de Cuba Libre. Gay also served as the delegate of the Syndicat des Artistes Lyriques to the General Confederation of Labour at Bourges in September 1904. Like many anarchists and unionists of the period, Gay was an active freemason.

A committed naturist, Gay went on to assist in the founding of a naturist community in Brières-les-Scellés. Gay was credited by contemporaries as being in-part responsible for the development of naturist ideals. Gay co-signed a declaration concerning "the natural state and the proletarian's share in civilization" as part of Les Naturiens (Propagandistes) in 1897. Among other statements, the declaration asserted a belief that "the mere natural production of the soil establishes abundance", that "material progress is the fruit of slavery", and that "harmony for humanity resides in nature".

In his writings, Gay argued for a society founded on the principles of equality, justice, and the rejection of authority. Gay wrote that "under any government, freedom is a myth and social harmony is an illusory utopia", arguing that "to recognise a master is to renounce right and free will or to negate oneself".

Sylvain Wagnon, an academic at the University of Montpellier, wrote that Gay's life trajectory reflects "a way of experiencing anarchism" that is "in bodies, in gestures" and "in harmony between personal life and individual and collective commitment".

Gay died in Paris in 1938.
