= David Gaynes =

American documentary filmmaker

David Gaynes is an American documentary filmmaker with three critically praised features in distribution. Films directed by Gaynes include the independent features Next Year Jerusalem (2014), Saving Hubble (2012) and Keeper of the Kohn (2005). He was one of 40 filmmakers worldwide to contribute a scene to the award-winning ensemble documentary Sacred, directed by Academy Award-winning director Thomas Lennon and broadcast on PBS in December, 2018. Gaynes is an accomplished documentary cinematographer, having photographed the award-winning All Me: The Life and Times of Winfred Rembert (2011) among other films.
