= Charlotte Evelyn Gay =

English social and temperance reformer (1867–1958)

- Born: 22 February 1867; Norwood, London, England
- Died: 1 November 1958 (aged 91)
- Relatives: Leslie Gay (brother); Kingsmill Key (cousin)

Charlotte Evelyn Gay, OBE (22 February 1867 – 1 November 1958) was an English social reformer whose affiliations with the Church Army and her recognition as an Officer of the Order of the British Empire (OBE) marked her as a significant temperance figure of the early 20th century.

== Early life and education ==
Charlotte Evelyn Gay was born at Norwood, London on 22 February 1867. Her parents were Rev. Alfred Henry Gay (b. 1836) and Ada Key (née Hewitt) Gay (b. 1845). Charlotte had four siblings, Sidney Alfred Gay (b. 1865), Leslie Hewitt Gay (b. 1871), Ada Muriel Augusta Gay (b. 1880), and Cyril Herbert Tay (b. 1884). Leslie was a first-class cricketer who played for Cambridge University, Hampshire, Somerset and England; as a footballer, he played for Cambridge University, the Corinthians and England. Her cousin, Kingsmill Key, captained Surrey in the 1890s.

She was educated at Brighton, Sussex.

== Career ==
Early in life, she was interested in the temperance movement, and became actively identified with the work of the Church Army shortly after its foundation in Westminster in 1882. In 1896, she was chosen honorary secretary of the Temperance Department of the organization, in which capacity she served until 1915. In 1920, she was serving in the role of Director for Parcels to British Prisoners for the Church Army. By 1925, she was a member of the Church Army's executive board, and also served on various committees.

Gay was an honorary secretary of the Church Army's Women's Preventive Homes Department. During her years of official service with the Church Army, she founded three homes for inebriate women in England, which institutions she personally superintended, until they were rendered unnecessary, owing to the increase in the number of restrictions on the sale of intoxicating liquors imposed by the British Government.

She maintained her business headquarters at 55 Bryanston street, Marble Arch, London, W. I.

== Personal life ==
Never married, Charlotte Evelyn Gay died on 1 November 1958, at the age of 91.

== Awards and honours ==
In recognition of her service to the English people, Gay was created an Officer of the Order of the British Empire, on 1 January 1920.
