= Edward Gay =

Edward Gay may refer to:

- Edward Gay (artist), (1837–1928), Irish-born landscape painter
- Edward J. Gay (politician, born 1816), U.S. Representative from Louisiana
- Edward J. Gay (politician, born 1878), U.S. Senator from Louisiana; grandson of the elder E. J. Gay
- Edward Gay, prisoner on the ship St. Michael of Scarborough
