= Leslie Gay =

English cricketer and footballer

- Photograph of Leslie Gay in the 1890s

Personal information
- Full name: Leslie Hewitt Gay
- Born: 24 March 1871; Brighton, Sussex, England
- Died: 1 November 1949 (aged 78); Sidmouth, Devon, England
- Height: 5 ft 11 in (1.80 m)
- Batting: Right-handed
- Role: Wicket-keeper
- Relatives: Charlotte Evelyn Gay (sister); Kingsmill Key (cousin)

International information
- National side: England
- Only Test (cap 91): 14 December 1894 v Australia

Domestic team information
- Years: Team
- 1891–1894: Cambridge University
- 1894–1904: Marylebone Cricket Club
- 1894: Somerset
- 1900: Hampshire

Career statistics
Competition	Tests	First-class
Matches	1	46
Runs scored	37	1,005
Batting average	18.50	15.46
100s/50s	–/–	–/2
Top score	33	60*
Catches/stumpings	3/1	70/20
- Source: Cricinfo, 17 December 2008
Association football career
- Position: Goalkeeper
Senior career*
Years	Team	Apps	(Gls)
1900–1901	Southampton	0	(0)
International career
1893–1894	England	3	(0)
- * Club domestic league appearances and goals

Leslie Hewitt Gay (24 March 1871 – 1 November 1949) was an English dual-international sportsman who played both cricket and football. In cricket, he played predominantly as a wicket-keeper for Cambridge University, but also played county cricket for Hampshire, Somerset. He played Test cricket for England once during the 1894–95 Ashes Series in Australia. As a footballer, he played for Cambridge University, the Corinthians and three times for England, against Scotland and Wales.

== Early life and education ==
The son of The Reverend Alfred H. Gay, he was born at Brighton in March 1871. The family were well-off and well-connected; at the time of Gay's birth, the family had six servants, while he counted Sir Kingsmill Key, 4th Baronet as a cousin, who was himself a first-class cricketer for Surrey. The family later moved to Plaitford, which was at the time was part of Wiltshire, where his father was appointed rector. Gay's education was received at a variety of independent schools; first at St Mark's School in Windsor, then Park House in Reading. He later attended Marlborough College in Wiltshire from 1885 to 1887, then Brighton College until 1889, after which he went up to Clare College, Cambridge. He graduated with a Bachelor of Arts in 1893.

== Sporting career ==
=== Cricket ===
Prior to his matriculation to Cambridge, Gay played "second-class" county cricket for Hampshire (who had lost their first-class status in 1885) beginning in 1888, with his first match against fellow "second-class" county Somerset resulting in a heavy loss. In 1890, Gay received praise for his performance in a match against Sussex (a first-class side); helping Hampshire to a 164-run victory by scoring 63 not out in the first innings.

Having matriculated to Cambridge in 1890, Gay found his way into the Cambridge team was blocked by Gregor MacGregor, the incumbent Cambridge wicket-keeper, who was selected by England for two of the three Test matches that summer, and described as "a wicket-keeper of extraordinary ability" in Oxford and Cambridge Cricket. He eventually made his first-class debut for Cambridge against the Marylebone Cricket Club (MCC) at Fenner's in 1891. Following MacGregor's graduation in 1891, Gay managed to establish himself in the Cambridge side in 1892 and 1893; in a preview of the 1892 season, the magazine Cricket praised Gay's "excellent form as a wicket-keeper for Hampshire", and he captained one of the sides in the Seniors' trial match. He made a further seven first-class appearances for Cambridge in 1892, but missed a couple of matches due to an injury he picked up playing for Hampshire against Sussex. His cricket season with Cambridge culminated with him winning his Blue, appearing in the University Match against Oxford. Although Oxford won by five wickets, Gay was commended for wicket-keeping which was "one of the very best features of the match" and "quite up to the best standard of amateur cricket" according to Cricket. After several more prestigious players had turned down invitations to play for the Gentlmen in the 1892 Gentlemen v Players fixture at The Oval, Gay accepted an invitation to play for the team. He also played a late season match for the West of England against the East in Portsmouth.

In his final season at Cambridge, he made nine first-class appearances, which included a second appearance in The University Match. He made additional first-class appearances in 1893 for the South of England against the touring Australians at The Oval, and for a Cambridge University Past and Present team against the same opposition at Portsmouth. From 1891 to 1893, he made seventeen appearances for Cambridge, scoring 428 runs at an average of 18.60; he made two half centuries, with a highest score of 60 not out.

After graduating from Cambridge, he played four matches for Somerset in the 1894 County Championship, in addition to playing twice for the South in the North v South fixtures and for the MCC against Yorkshire at the Scarborough Festival. He did enough in these matches to be selected to tour Australia with Andrew Stoddart's team for the 1894–95 Ashes Series. He played three first-class matches at the start of the tour against South Australia, Victoria and New South Wales, before being selected for the England team to play in the First Test against Australia at Melbourne. In England's first innings, he scored 33 batting from number ten before being dismissed by Jack Reedman, while following-on in their second innings he was dismissed for 4 runs by Harry Trott. Behind the stumps he made four dismissals (three catches and one stumping), with England winning the Test by 10 runs. Gay was replaced for the remaining four Test matches by Hylton Philipson. He featured in two further first-class matches on the tour, against Victoria and South Australia. He was the first Somerset cricketer to play Test cricket for England.

Following the tour of Australia, Gay opted to stay in British Ceylon to work as a coffee planter, where he would remain until 1898, when he returned to England to marry Marguerite Dora Becke. He resumed his first-class career in 1900, playing for the MCC against Leicestershire at Lord's, in addition to also playing nine first-class matches for Hampshire in that season's County Championship. Shortly thereafter, he emigrated to Canada, where he was a rancher in Alberta. He had returned to England by 1904, where he made a final first-class appearance at Lord's for the MCC against London County. In first-class cricket, Gay made 46 appearances and scored 1,005 runs at an average of 15.46. As a wicket-keeper, he took 70 catches and made 20 stumpings.

=== Football ===
As a schoolboy, Gay initially played football as a centre-forward, but after an injury which prevented him from playing for a few years he returned as a full-back. It was playing this position that he won the Sussex Senior Challenge Cup in 1888–89 with Brighton College. After going up to Cambridge University, he initially tried for the university team as a defender, but could not secure a place. Instead, he dedicated himself to developing his skills as a goalkeeper, a position he had dallied with as a youngster.

His training paid off, as in 1891, he was selected to play as goalkeeper for England in a match against the touring Canadians. Though it was not an 'official' international match, The Times described England's team as being a "strong eleven", and they won 6–1. Gay earned his football Blue in February 1892, when his goalkeeping drew praise from The Times during a 5–1 victory for Cambridge University over Oxford University. After his graduation from university, he played for Old Brightonians and Corinthian F.C. After a strong performance in the Amateurs against Professionals trial match, he was selected to play versus Scotland in the 1892–93 British Home Championship, which England won 5–2. He featured in goal for England again the following year, playing in a 5–1 win against Wales in March, followed by a 2–2 draw with Scotland in April.

After returning from Ceylon, Gay joined Southampton in 1900 as reserve to fellow England goalkeeper, Jack Robinson, although he never played for the first team.

== Military service and later life ==
Gay served in the First World War, being commissioned as a lieutenant in the Territorial Force. He was promoted to captain with the South Lancashire Regiment in September 1915, before being made an adjutant in March 1916. He relinquished this appointment in September of the same year, and was seconded to the staff the following month. He relinquished his appointment to the staff in July 1918, having been made a temporary major in June 1918 for his appointment to assistant commandant with the Royal Defence Corps. Following the end of the war, Gay relinquished his commission in September 1919 but retained the rank of captain.

Gay was a keen golfer, having been secretary of the Northamptonshire Golf Club and later the East Devon Golf Club, with him representing Devon in the sport. Having split from his wife, he opted to live a "hedonistic" lifestyle; playing golf and cricket, and sharing the home of a wealthy young widower in east Devon. After the widowers' death he remained in the area, later dying in a nursing home at Sidmouth in November 1949. He was survived by his sister, Charlotte Evelyn Gay, who was a social reformer.

== See also ==
- List of English cricket and football players
- One-Test wonder

== Bibliography ==
- Ashley-Cooper, F. S.; Haygarth, Arthur (2004) [1925]. M. C. C. Cricket Scores and Biographies. Vol. XV. Little Eversden, Cambridgeshire: Roger Heavens. ISBN 1-900592-44-4.
- Chesterton, George; Doggart, Hubert (1989). Oxford and Cambridge Cricket. London: Willow Books. ISBN 0-00-218295-5.
- Hill, Stephen (2016). Somerset Cricketers 1882 – 1914. Wellington, Somerset: Halsgrove. ISBN 978-0-85704-291-0.
- Juson, Dave; Bull, David (2001). Full-Time at The Dell. Hagiology Publishing. ISBN 0-9534474-2-1.
- Page, William, ed. (1911). "Parishes: Plaitford". A History of the County of Hampshire: Volume 4. London: Victoria County History – via British History Online.
