= George Gay =

George Gay may refer to:

- George H. Gay Jr. (1917–1994), American World War II pilot
- George K. Gay (1810–1882), Oregon pioneer who participated in the Provisional Government
- Georges Gay (1926–1997), French cyclist
- George Gay, lynching victim in Texas on December 11, 1922, see lynching of George Gay
