= Walter Gay =

American painter (1856–1937)

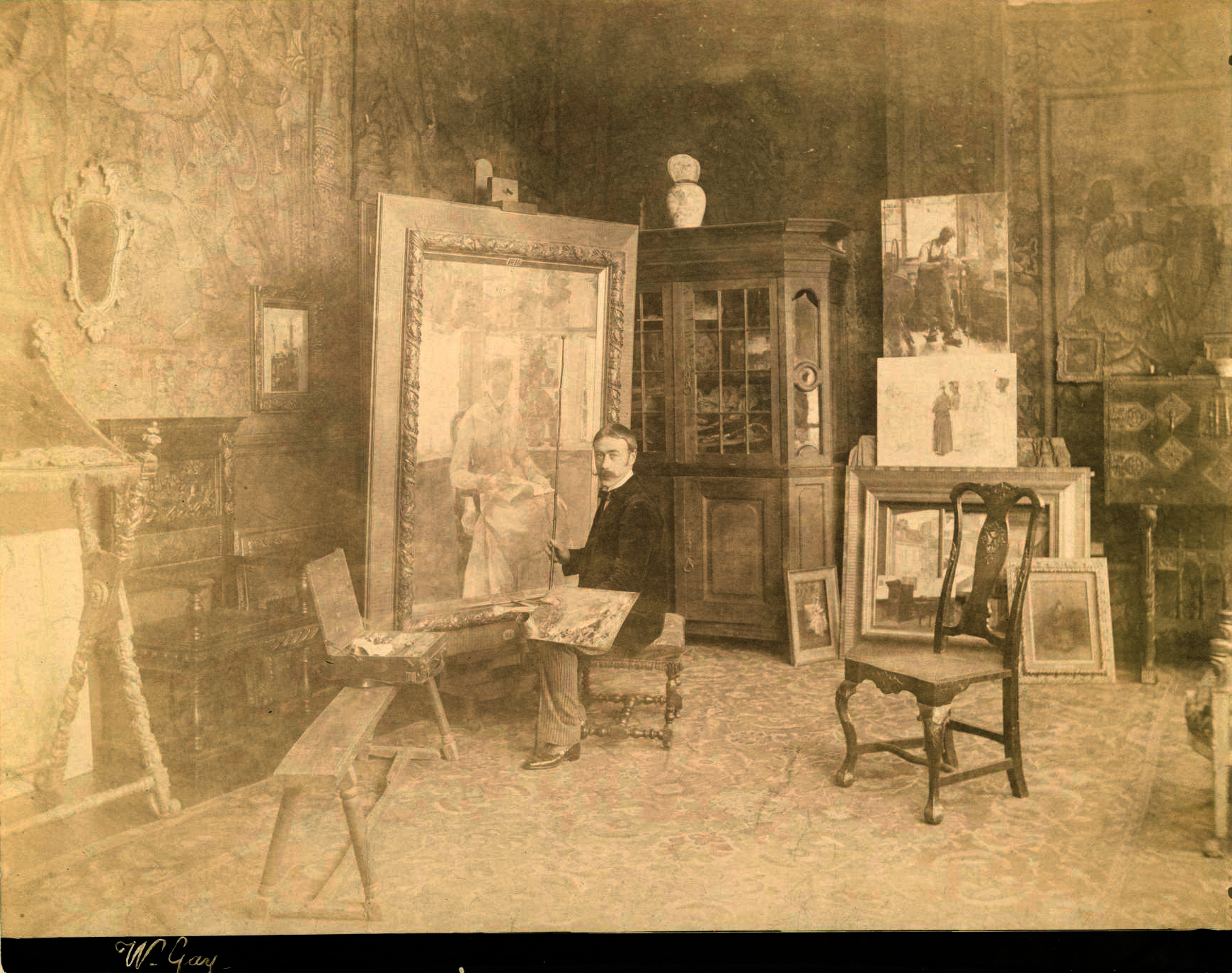
- Gay in his studio
- Born: January 22, 1856; Hingham, Massachusetts, United States
- Died: July 13, 1937 (aged 81); Le Bréu, Dammarys les Lys, near Fontainebleau, France
- Known for: Painting, Drawing, Art collector

Walter Gay (January 22, 1856 – July 13, 1937) was an American painter noted both for his genre paintings of French peasants, paintings of opulent interior scenes and as a notable art collector.

== Early life ==
Walter Gay was born on January 22, 1856, in Hingham, Massachusetts, into an established New England family. He was the son of Ebenezer and Ellen Blake (née Blood) Gay. His uncle was the Boston painter Winckworth Allan Gay, who encouraged his interest in art and studying in Paris.

== Career ==
In 1876, Gay sailed to Paris, France, where he became a pupil of Léon Bonnat. A fellow student during this period was John Singer Sargent with whom Gay developed a friendship. Bonnat encouraged the young artist to travel to Spain, where he studied and copied the work of Velázquez. He also encountered the work of Spanish artist, Mariano Fortuny. These artists became an important influences on Gay's brushwork, use of color and understanding of light.

Walter Gay received an honorable mention in the Paris Salon of 1885; a gold medal in 1888, and similar awards at Vienna (1894), Antwerp (1895), Berlin (1896) and Munich (1897). He was one of the few artists selected to represent the United States at the Exposition Universelle in Paris in 1889. He became an Officer of the Legion of Honor and a member of the Society of Secession, Munich.

During his lifetime, his work was exhibited in every major European city: Antwerp, Berlin, Budapest, Vienna and Paris. In 1904, he was elected into the National Academy of Design as an Associate Academician.

Many young American artists who arrived in Paris in the late 19th-century became Gay's pupils to the extent that the New York Times dubbed him the "Dean of American Artists in Paris." His students who went on to have illustrious careers include: Henry Bacon.

His first compositions were still lifes, followed by depictions of 18th-century French peasant life. Later he shifted to genre scenes of realistic depictions of peasants and factory workers.

However, beginning around 1895, he abandoned such simple peasant scenes, virtually creating a new genre with his depictions of luxurious interiors. He is most noted for these paintings of opulent interiors show-casing French chateaux and chic private homes. These painterly works display the luxurious detail of domestic interiors which included fine porcelain, furnishings, gilt mirrors, paintings and focused on the "spirit of an empty room" by avoiding the inclusion of figures.

Gay was also a notable art collector. Following his death in 1937, his widow donated some 200 works of Dutch, Italian, English and French paintings, drawings and illustrations to the Louvre, indicating something of the collection's importance.

== Personal life ==
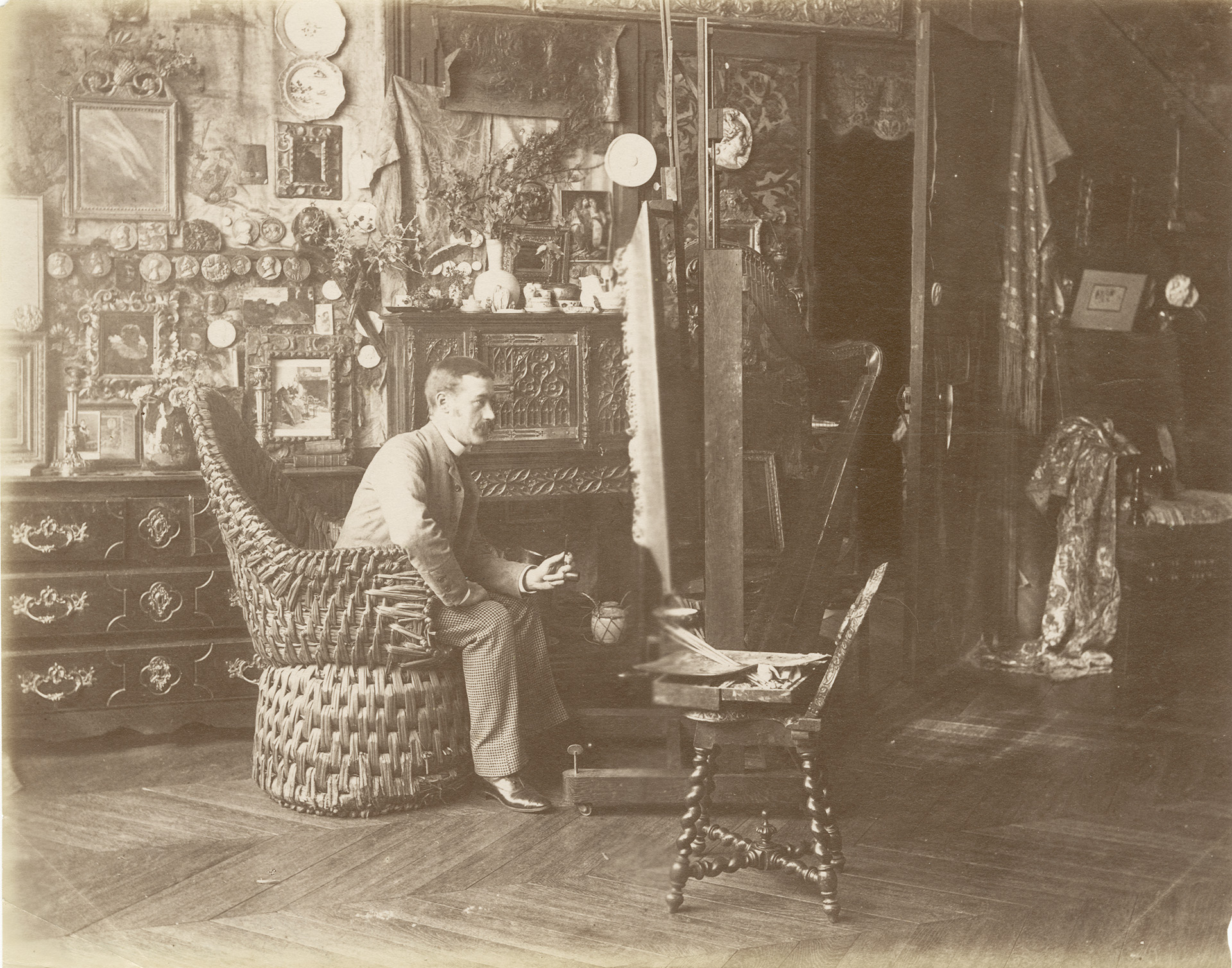
Gay in his Paris studio, c. 1884–1894, albumen print by Edmond Bénard, Department of Image Collections, National Gallery of Art Library, Washington, D.C.

In 1889, Gay married Matilda E. Travers, the heiress daughter of William R. Travers, a prominent New York City investor and co-founder of Saratoga Race Course. His wife's fortune allowed the couple to live very comfortably. They divided their time between their country homes and their Paris apartment. In Paris, Gay and his wife lived in an apartment on the Left Bank and, in 1907, purchased Chateau Le Bréau on a 300-acre (1.2 km^{2}) walled park near the Forest of Fontainebleau. His wife maintained a diary of the couple's time in Europe.

Walter Gay died at Le Bréau, Dammarys les Lys, near Fontainebleau on July 13, 1937.

His widow remained at their home in France which was taken over by German officers following the German occupation of France during World War II. A virtual prisoner in her own home, Matilda Travers Gay died there in 1943.

== Awards and recognition ==
Gay was created Chevalier Legion of Honor in 1894; Officer Legion of Honor in 1906 and a Commander of the Legion of Honor in 1927. He was also awarded the honor of Life Fellow Metropolitan Museum of Art, New York.

== Selected works ==
Works by Gay are represented in many of the world's most prestigious art museums, including: the Luxembourg Museum, the Tate Gallery (London), and the Boston Museum of Fine Arts, the Metropolitan (New York), the Art Institute, the Frick in Pittsburgh, the Carnegie Museum of Art, the Smithsonian American Art Museum, Museum of Brussels, Pinacotheca Museum, Munich, Pennsylvania Academy of the Fine Arts, Albright Art Gallery and the Musée d'Orsay in Paris, France.

- Geraniums, n.d., before 1890
- Hollyhocks, n.d. before 1890
- The Spinners, 1885
- Les Tisseuses (The Weavers), 1885
- Novembre, Etaples, c. 1885
- The Knife-grinder, c. 1888
- Charity, 1889
- Le Bénédicité (The Blessing), 1889, Museum de Picardie, Amiens, France.
- Las Cigarreras (Cigar Makers, Seville), n.d., c. 1890
- The Music Room and Dining Room of Eben Howard Gay's House, Boston, 1902
- La Commode, 1905
- La Chaise-Longue (Room in the Chateau de Bréau, near Paris), c. 1905
- The Chinese Screen, after 1909
- The Artist's Study, Rue de la Universite, 1910
- The Open Window - Le Breau, 1910
- The Green Salon, 1912
- Salon of Comptesse Robert de Fitz-James, 1913
- Blue and White [Dining room of Mrs Josiah Bradlee, Boston], 1913
- Le Grand Salon, Musée Jacquemart-André, c. 1913
- Feu de Cheminée dans un Intérieur, n.d.
- Boudoir, Chateau de Chaalis, 1914
- The "Ethan Frome Kitchen" Old Fairbanks House, Dedham, Mass, c.1890-1922
- The Living Hall: The Frick Collection, 1928

== Gallery ==
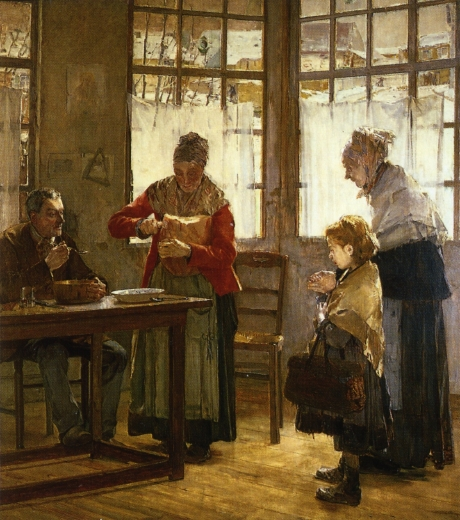
Charity, 1889, Private collection

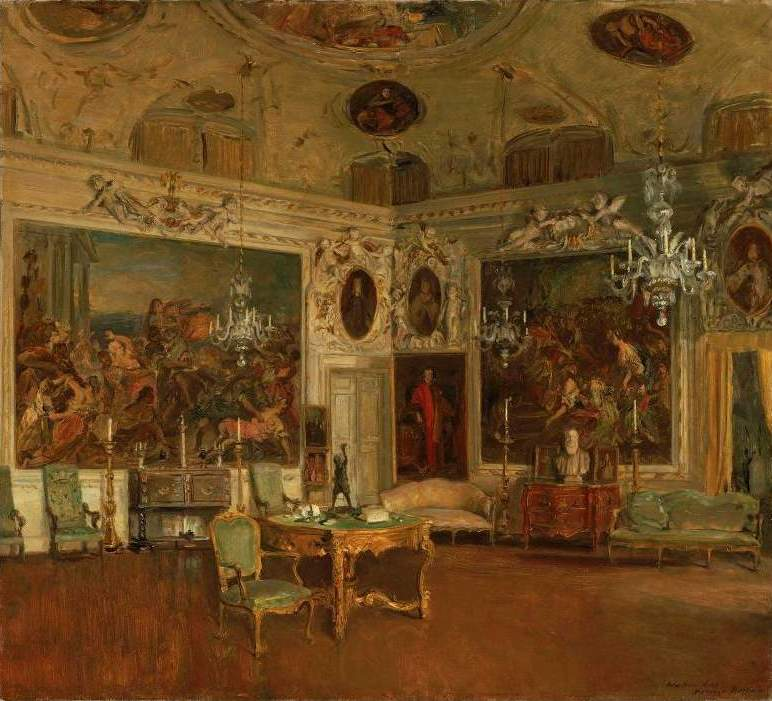
Interior of Palazzo Barbaro, Venice

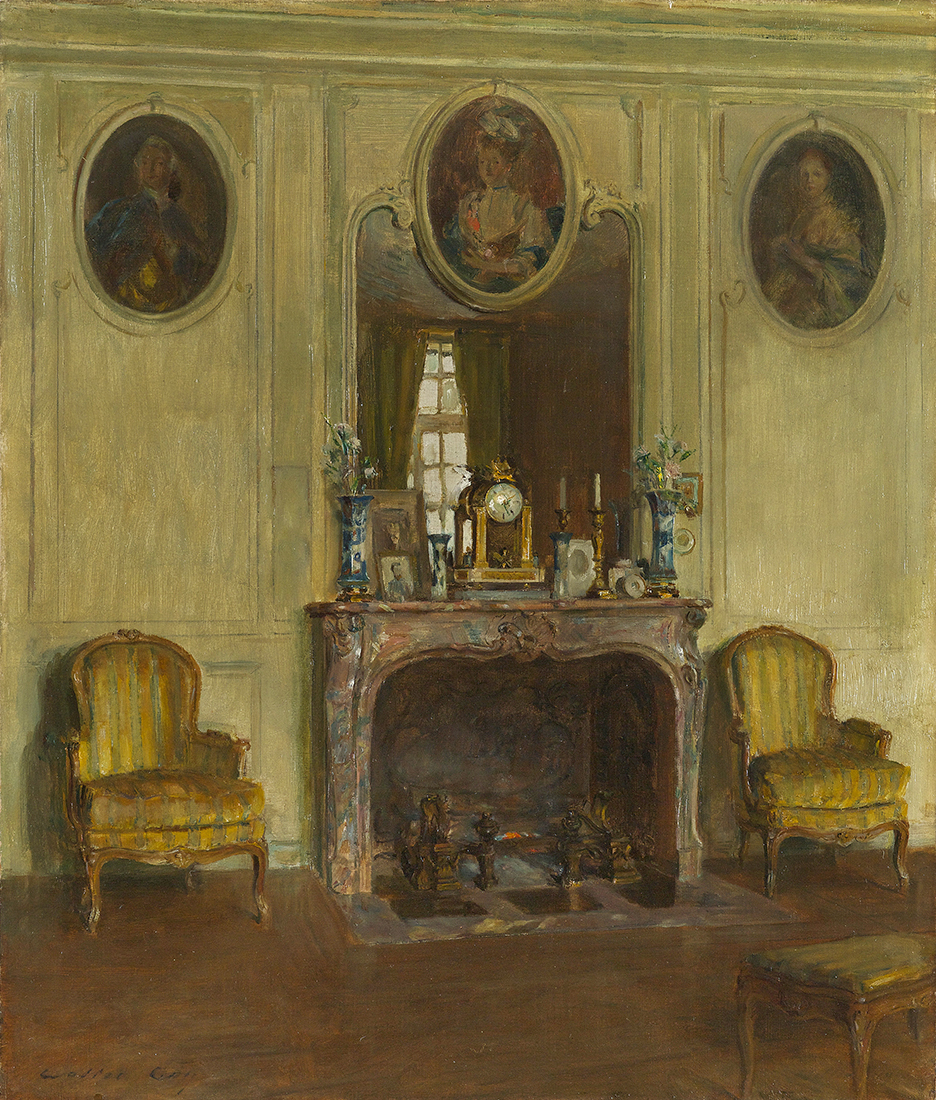
Interior at the Chateau du Breau

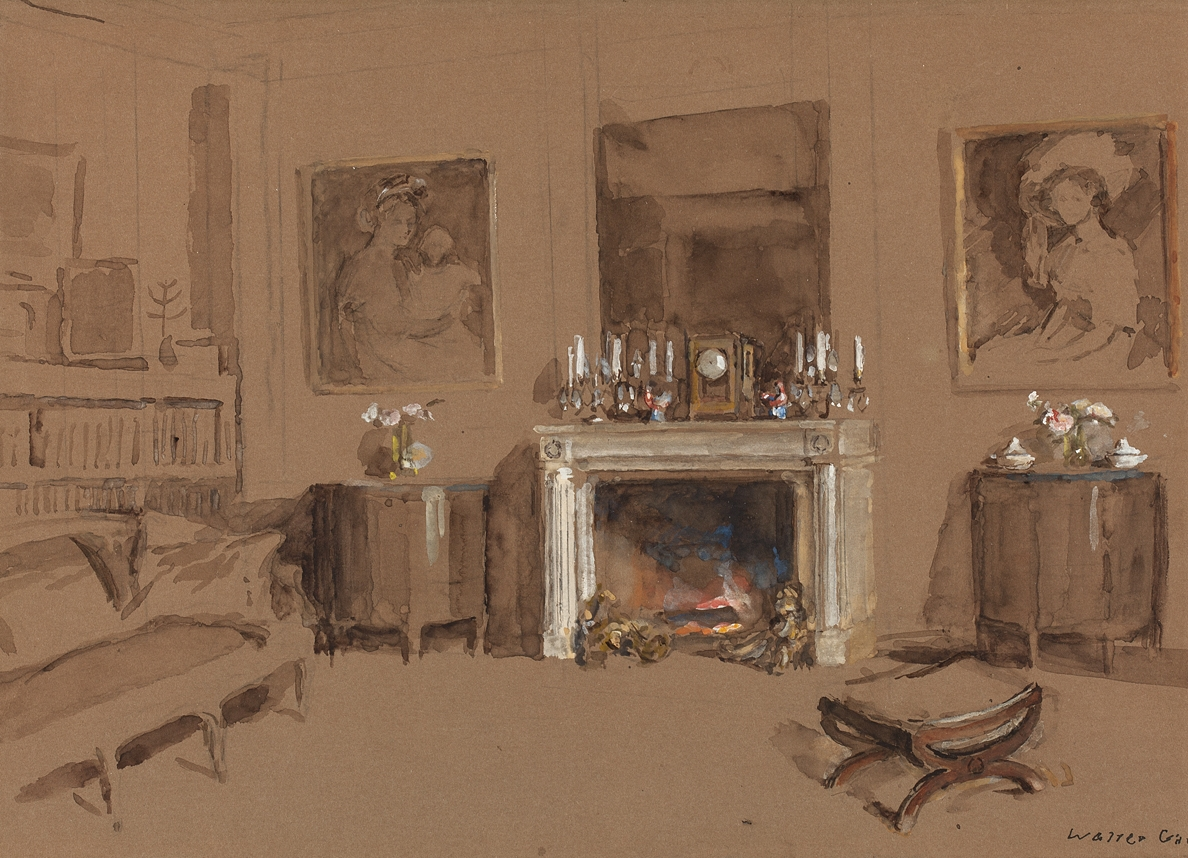
Interior with Fireplace

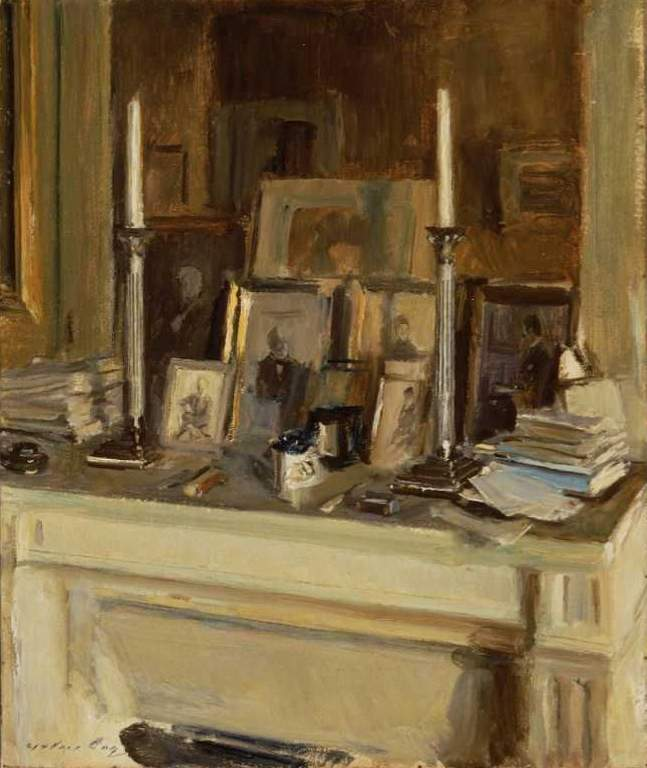
La Cheminée

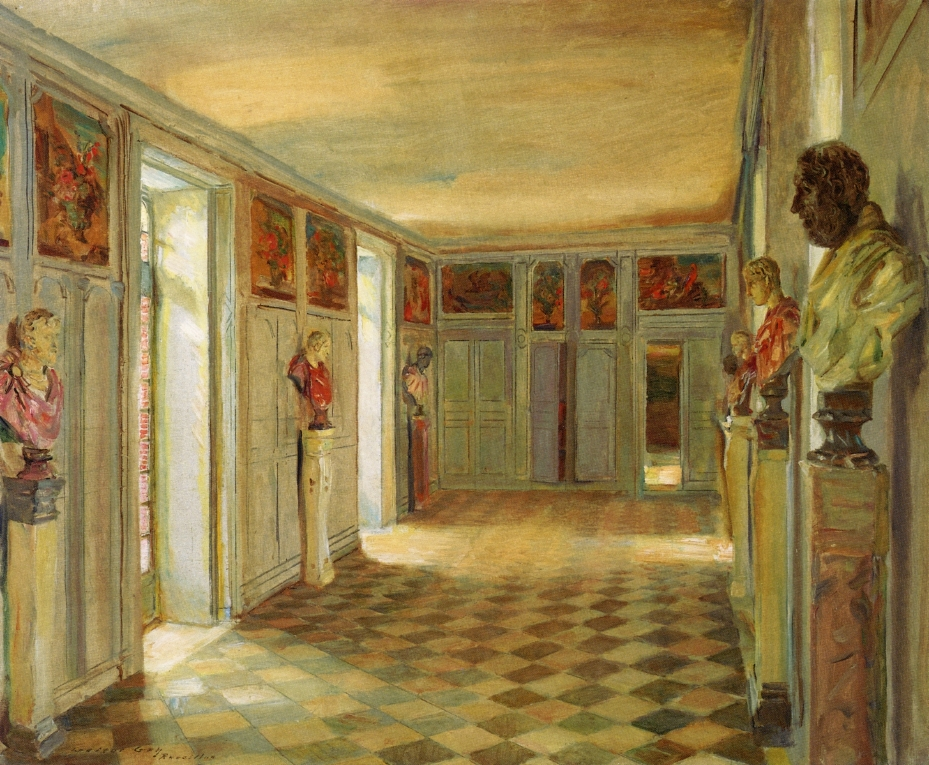
Galerie des Bustes, Chaeau du Reveillon

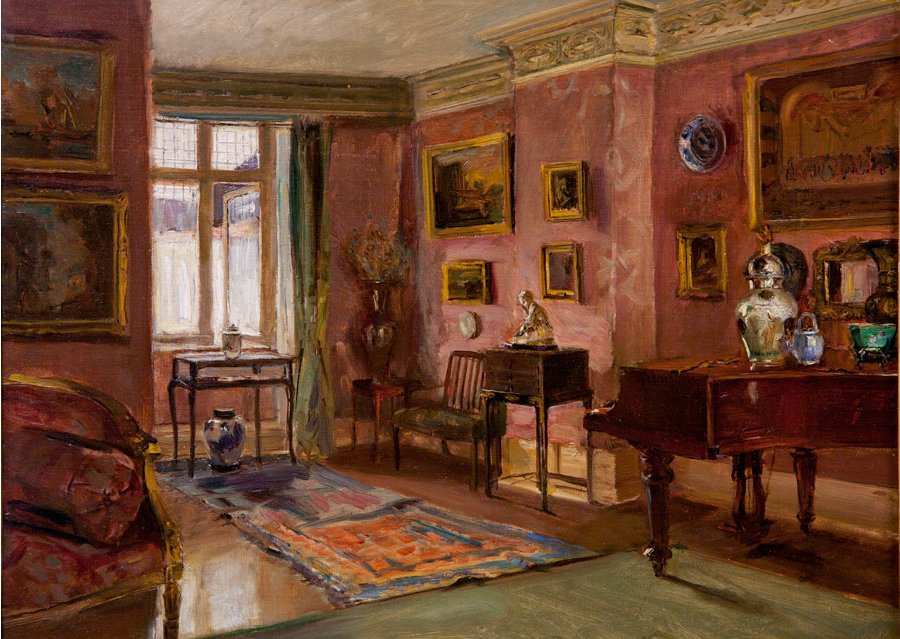
The Front Parlor, after 1909

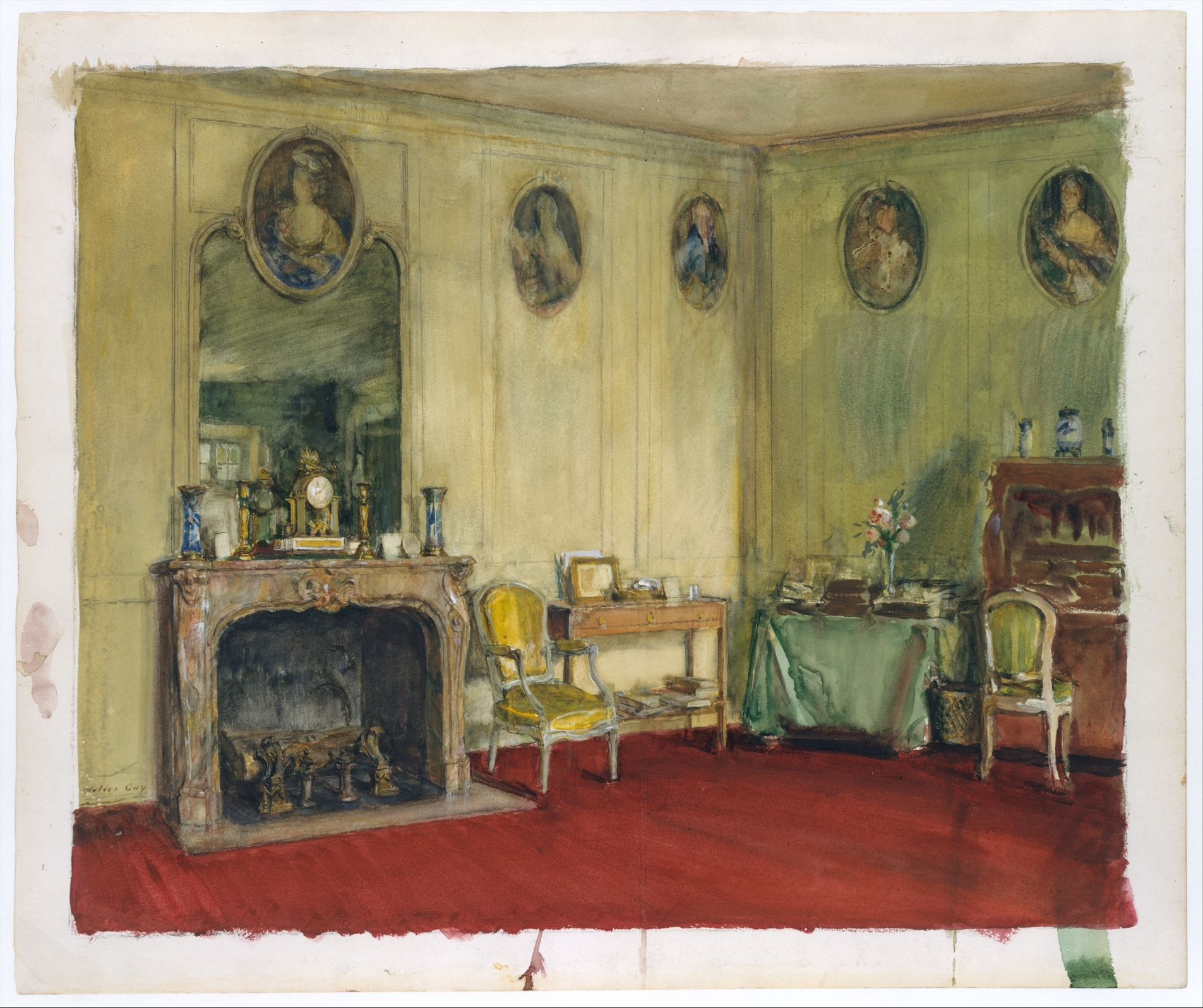
Interior, a watercolor, at the Metropolitan Museum of Art

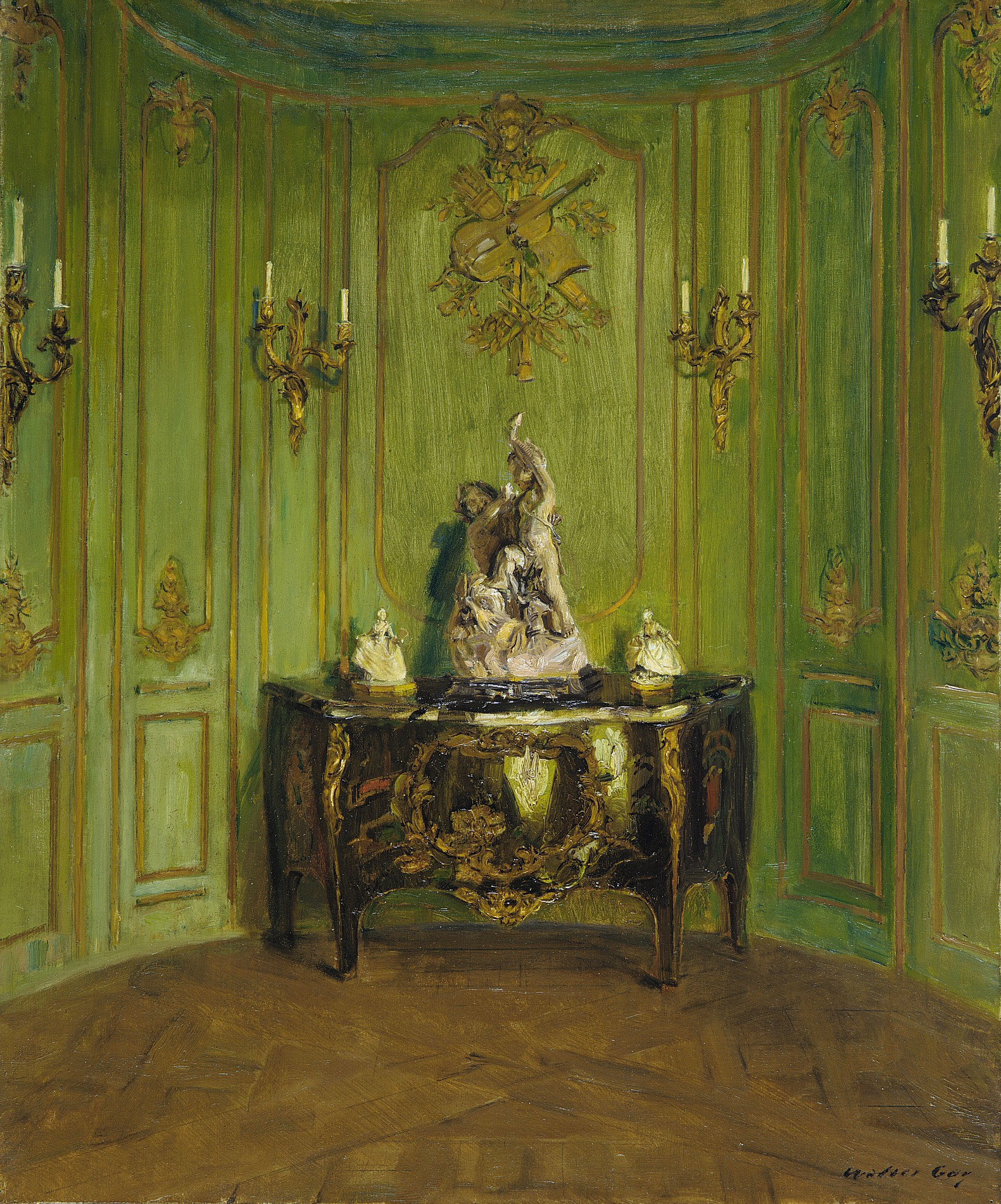
The Green Salon, 1912, at the Metropolitan Museum of Art

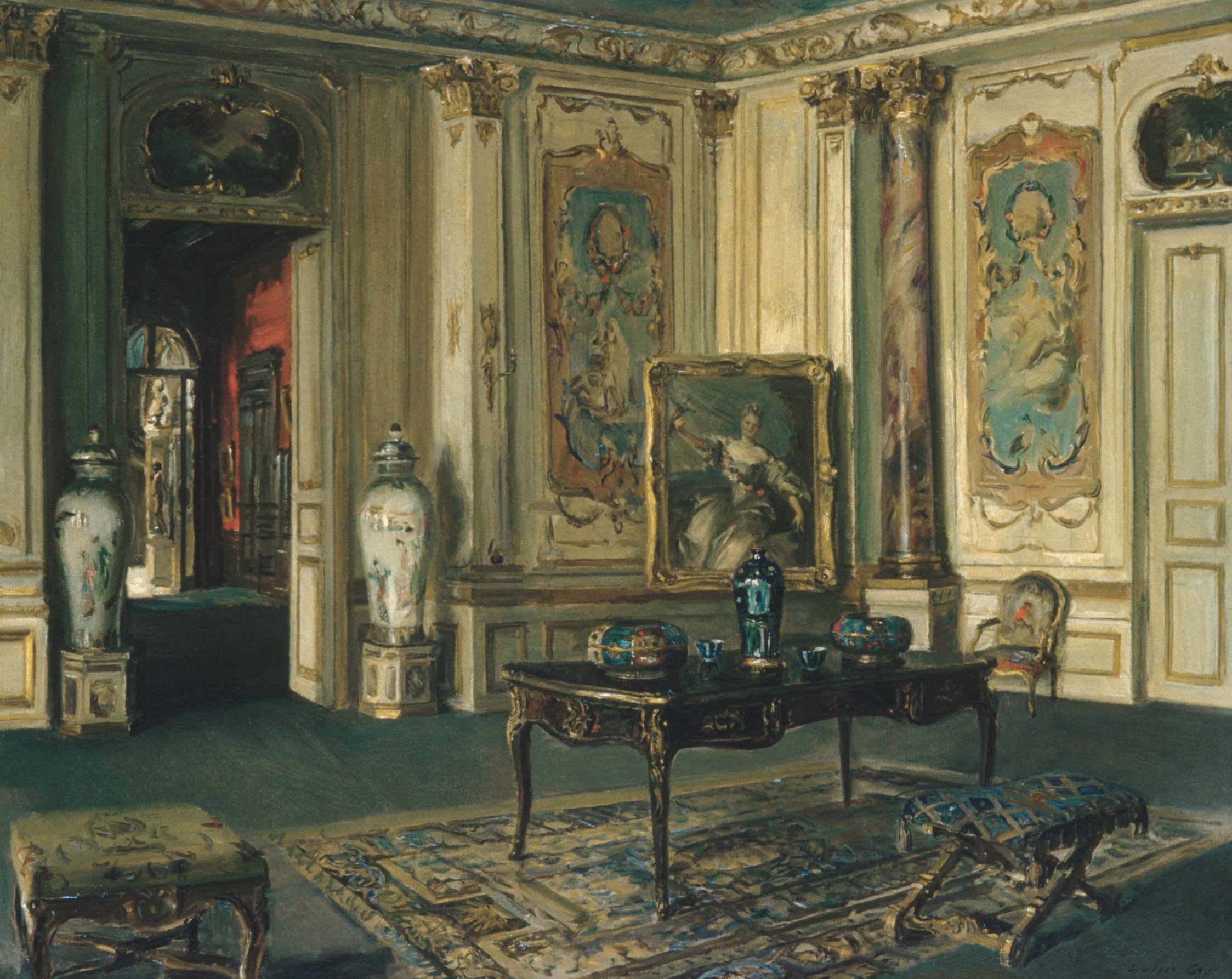
Le Grand Salon, Musée Jacquemart-André, 1913, at the Metropolitan Museum of Art
