= Robert Gay =

Robert Gay may refer to:

- Robert Gay (MP) (c. 1676–1738), English surgeon and politician
- Robert C. Gay (born 1951), general authority of The Church of Jesus Christ of Latter-day Saints
- Robert J. Gay, American palaeontologist
- Robert Marie Gay (1927–2016), Canadian-born Ugandan Roman Catholic prelate
