= John Gay (disambiguation) =

John Gay (1685–1732) was an English poet and dramatist.

John Gay may also refer to:

- John Gay (philosopher) (1699–1745), English philosopher
- John Gay (surgeon) (1813–1885), English surgeon
- John Gay (photographer) (1909–1999), British photographer
- John Gay (screenwriter) (1924–2017), American screenwriter
- John Gay (runner) (born 1996), Canadian runner

== See also ==
- Jonathan Gay (born 1967), American computer programmer and software entrepreneur
- John Gayer (disambiguation)
