= G. Pritchy Smith =

G. Pritchy Smith (born 1939) is a Professor Emeritus of Foundations and Secondary Education at the University of North Florida (UNF), Jacksonville, Florida where he taught courses in multicultural education. His writings and research concerned issues of multicultural education and social justice. He was one of the founders of the National Association for Multicultural Education (NAME). From 1996 to 2006, he coordinated UNF's M.Ed. Program in Belize, Central America. He is known for promoting and defining an expanded knowledge base about diversity for use in teacher training.

== Early life and education ==
Smith earned his B.A. in English at the University of Texas at Austin and his M.Ed. and Ed.D. at North Texas University.

== Career in education ==
Smith taught English at Central High School in San Angelo, Texas. He later taught at California State College, California, Pennsylvania, and served as Director of Teacher Education at two historically black institutions – Paul Quinn College, Waco, Texas and Jarvis Christian College in Hawkins, Texas. From 1985 to 1989, he served at the University of North Florida as Chairperson of the Division of Curriculum and Instruction.

== Affiliations ==
Smith is one of the founders and a past vice-president of the National Association for Multicultural Education (NAME), and he has served on NAME's board of directors and NAME's Publications Committee. For many years, he wrote a regular column, “Guide to New Resources,” in Multicultural Perspectives, NAME's official journal. He also prepared the conference programs for NAME's first two national meetings in New Orleans and Orlando. For several years, Smith was a faculty member of NAME's pre-conference Institute for Meeting the NCATE Diversity Standards.

== Publications ==
Smith is the author of several articles on multicultural education and has conducted research on the impact of testing on the racial and ethnic composition of the nation's teaching force. He is also the author of Common Sense about Uncommon Knowledge: The Knowledge Bases for Diversity in Teacher Education (1998) published by the American Association of Colleges for Teacher Education.. In addition, he has been a frequently invited lecturer and speaker at national conferences and consultant to school districts and colleges of education on preparing inservice and preservice teachers for culturally diverse student populations.

== Awards and accolades ==
In 1992 the Board of Directors of the National Association for Multicultural Education created in his honor the G. Pritchy Smith Multicultural Educator's Award for his contributions to founding and developing NAME as a national professional organization. He was selected by the faculty at the University of North Florida as the runner-up for the UNF Distinguished Professor Award in 1995, 1999 and 2000.

In 1998, he was selected as a recipient of the American Association of Colleges for Teacher Education's Advocate for Justice Award. In addition, he has received the Florida State University System's TIP Award and PEP Award for Excellence in Teaching. In 2002, he was selected as the recipient of the COBEC Service Award by the Consortium of Belize Education Cooperation, and in 2003 he was given the Outstanding Service Award for Educational Development of Belizeans by the Belize Association of Principals of Secondary Schools (BAPSS).

In 2004, the University of North Florida presented him with the Outstanding International Educator Award. He was selected as the William Allen Endowed Chair and Distinguished Professor of Education at Seattle University for the 2007–2008 academic year.

Dr. Smith delivered the keynote address to the Doctoral Research Symposium on May 21, 2011, at the University of North Florida. On June 30, 2011, G. Pritchy Smith retired from the University of North Florida. He presently lives part of the year on his ranch near Dublin, Texas and part of the year in his home in Neptune Beach, Florida. Even in retirement, Dr. Smith continues to work for the cause of social justice. On January 29, 2015, he delivered the keynote address, "Growing a Soul for Social Justice" for the Martin Luther King Luncheon at Kansas State University.
