= Antoine Gay =

Frenchman allegedly possessed by a demon (1790–1871)

Antoine Gay (31 May 1790 – 13 June 1871) was a Frenchman who was believed by some to have been possessed by a demon named Isacaron.

== Early life ==
Gay was born in Lantenay, Ain in 1790, the son of a public notary. He served in the First Empire's military and became a carpenter by trade, settling in Lyon. A very religious man, he desired to become a monk even during his youth. At the age of 46, he applied for entry into the Abbey of La Trappe d'Aiguebelle, and was accepted as a lay brother. He subsequently left the monastery due to a nervous disorder, which some claimed to be demon possession.

== Allegations of demon possession ==
Friar Burnoud, a former superior of the Missionaries of La Salette, wrote a letter to the then-Bishop of Grenoble in which he wrote that "We have examined Master Gay of Lyons three times, each session lasting from one to two hours. We consider it very probable that this man is possessed by a devil", citing various pieces of evidence including Gay disclosing "several secret things about which he had no means of knowing" and his apparent ability to understand Latin despite never having learned the language. A physician, one Dr. Pictet, expressed the view that Gay enjoyed "perfect health of body and mind" but was also "under the influence of some occult power, which we are naturally unable to detect by medical means" and that "we remain convinced that his extraordinary state can only be attributed to possession", citing as evidence "the fact that during our first interview with M. Gay, that extraordinary thing which speaks through his mouth revealed the inmost secrets of our heart, told us the story of our life from the age of twelve onwards, giving details that are known only to God, our confessor, and ourselves."

Following Pictet's observations, Gay's friends tried to have him readmitted to the Abbey of La Trappe, asking the abbot to perform an exorcism. The abbot refused because he was in the diocese of Valence, while Gay was from the diocese of Lyons. Antoine Gay lived in Lyons for the next few years, at one point being arrested as a lunatic and jailed for three months before being released.

== Fr. Chiron ==
Friar Marie-Joseph Chiron, who had founded a community that looked after the mentally disturbed, took an interest in Antoine Gay, believing him to be possessed. One day, Chiron brought Gay with him to the house of a woman nicknamed Chiquette, who was also allegedly possessed by a demon that Chiron referred to as "Madeste". Fr. Chiron claimed that when Gay met Chiquette, their demons began to argue with each other: "A remarkably violent dialogue arose between the two fallen angels. The two devils sounded like mad dogs. They spoke a totally unknown language, very softly and we understood nothing. I was later informed by Isacaron, who translated the dispute for me, that it was on a question of precedence, as to which was the greater of the two....the two possessed, it is needless to say, had never met each other, but the devils in possession knew each other well. Six times during the following days there occurred the same violent disputes, in the same unknown language, and in the presence of several witnesses." Friar Chiron claimed afterward that "Such facts are inexplicable except as cases of possession."

No exorcism was ever performed for Antoine Gay, and he died in June 1871 in Lyons.
