= Winckworth Allan Gay =

American painter

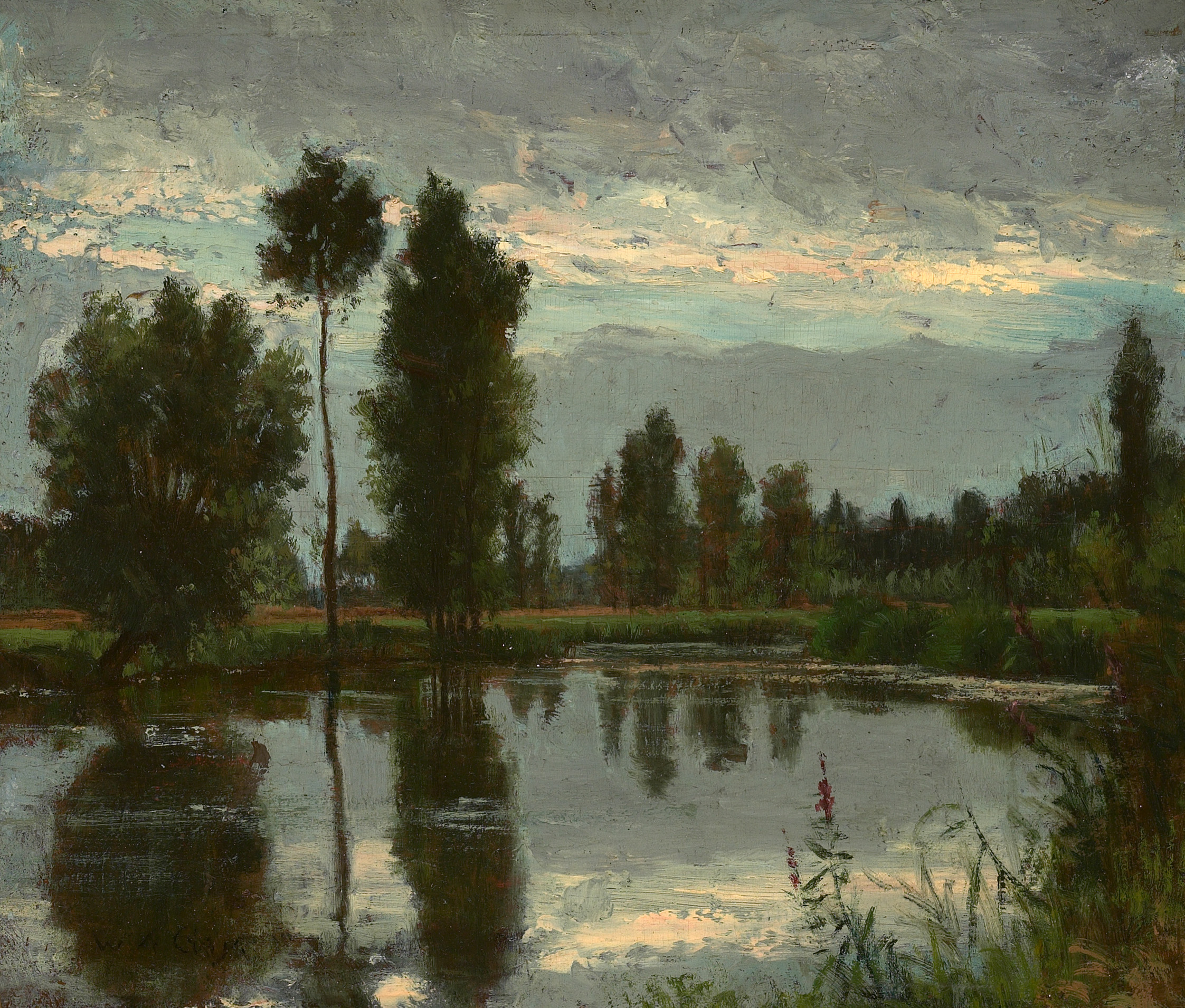
- Grez-sur-Loing painting by Winckworth Allan Gay
- Born: August 18, 1821; West Hingham, Massachusetts, U.S.
- Died: February 23, 1910 (aged 88); West Hingham, Massachusetts, U.S.
- Education: Robert Walter Weir, Westpoint, Mass.; Constant Troyon, Paris
- Known for: Painting
- Movement: Orientalist; Barbizon school Hudson River School

Winckworth Allan Gay (August 18, 1821 – February 23, 1910) was an American landscape artist and was one of the first American artists to promote the Barbizon style of pastoral landscape painting. He studied art in the United States, including West Point and then France and the far east, and came to produce many landscapes during his extended tours of these places. Gay produced many works during his lifetime, all the way up to his last few final years.

== Early life ==
Winckworth Allan Gay was born at Hingham, Massachusetts on August 18, 1821. After completing his common education in public schools, he received his early art education from Robert Walter Weir, at Westpoint, New York. Thereafter he spent four years in Europe, where he studied with Constant Troyon in Paris. He became one of the first Americans to espouse the Barbizon style of landscape painting. Gay's older brother was Sydney Howard Gay, an abolitionist and the editor of National Anti-Slavery Standard. At the age of seventeen Gay attended the United States Military Academy at West Point and studied under Robert Walter Weir, the resident professor of drawing, where Gay obtained a sound foundation in drawing and art. Winckworth had a nephew, Walter Gay, who was also a noted painter of French subjects and spent much time painting in France.

== Career ==
In 1847 Gay went to France and continued his studies under Constant Troyon in Paris, who influenced Gay's the formation his sober and personal style which became characteristic of Gay's work. While in Paris, he met Benjamin Champney, also from New England, and went on sketching trips together in much of Europe. After studying with Troyon at his Paris studio Gay visited Italy, Switzerland, and Holland. After returning to the United States he set up his studio in Boston. After he settled he often traveled to the White Mountains in New Hampshire, often visiting the artist's colony at West Compton. After twenty-four years of work, Gay auctioned off his entire collection of paintings in 1874 to fund a four-year visit to Japan, and was one of the first Americans to take up residence there.

Gay returned to Europe in 1874, and eventually visited Egypt, China and Japan. During his four-year tour in Japan, he produced a number of paintings with subjects that included canals, temples, and old castles, and which have been described as his Orientalist work.

In the 1850s Gay exhibited his paintings at the Boston Athenæum which were displayed alongside works by notable European masters such as William Holman Hunt, and Narcisse Virgilio Díaz and Jean-François Millet, serving as "proud reminders" that Boston artists were well-versed in the latest art trends in Europe.

His unique talent was to integrate the Barbizon style of painting with the more well-known Hudson River School style. His work was very popular with collectors. During his lifetime, his work appeared at the Boston Art Club, and the National Academy of Design.

In 1877, he traveled to the far East for an overall tour lasting five years. He spent a winter in China, working in and around Hong Kong, Canton, and Macao. He spent the following winter in India, with the remainder of his time visiting Japan, where he made lengthy sojourns at Tokio, Yokohama, and Kioto, along with time spent in various smaller towns. His return home was made by way of Europe, where he spent two years or in Paris. Gay set up an exhibition in Boston which contained over a hundred of his sketches and paintings, including landscapes he painted while in Egypt, Holland, Italy, the far east, and America.

His work is in the Smithsonian American Art Museum, the Brooklyn Museum of Art, and the Museum of Fine Arts.

During his career as a painter, Gay exhibited his works at the Brooklyn Art Association in 1872 and 1879, the Boston Art Club from 1873 to 1877, the Pennsylvania Academy of Fine Arts, and the National Academy of Design in 1869 and 1875. Today his works are on display at the Boston Athenaeum and the Hingham Historical Society. His sketchbook is held at the Archives of American Art.

=== Selected works ===
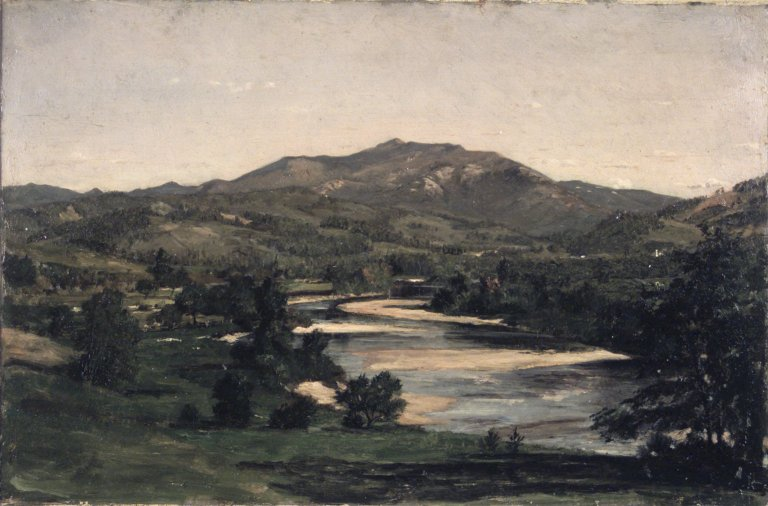
Study for Welch Mountain from West Compton, New Hampshire, c. 1856 (now in Brooklyn Museum)

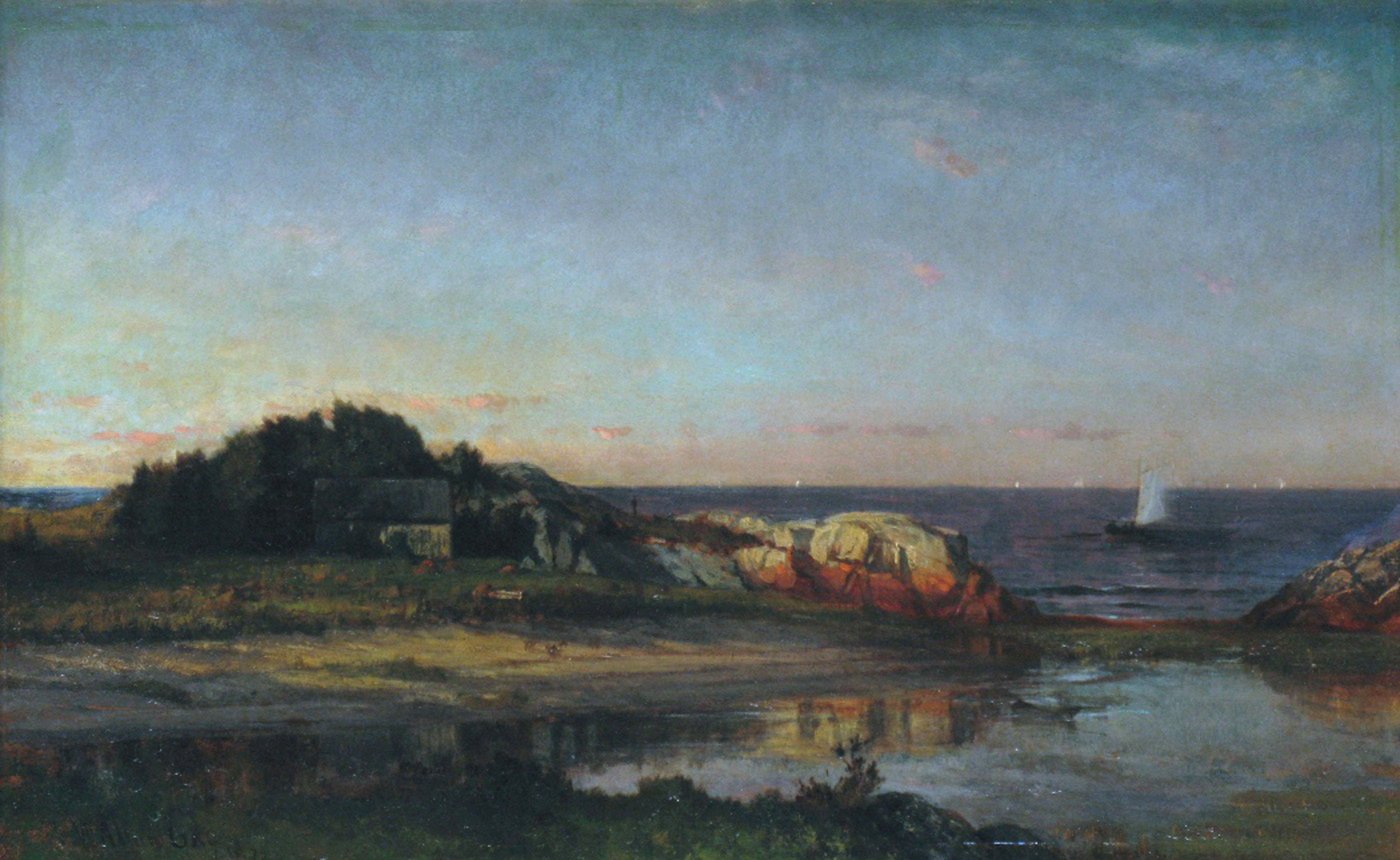
Sailing off the Seashore, Cohasset, 1872

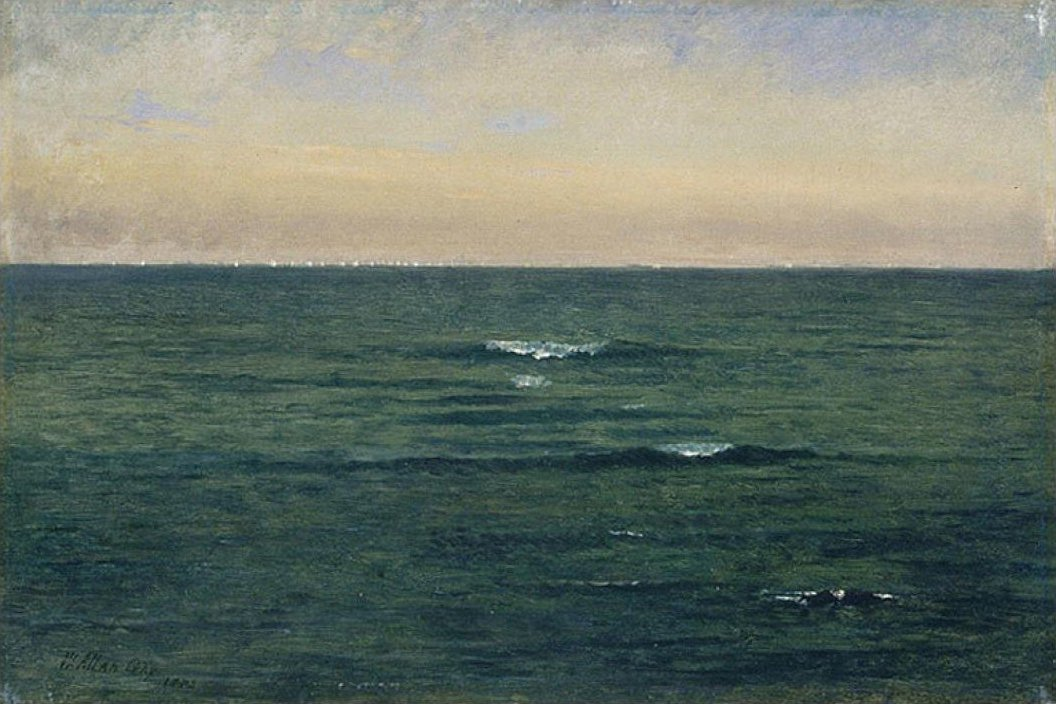
Mackerel Fleet, 1872

== Final days and legacy ==
Gay spent the last few years of his life in retirement at his hometown in West Hingham, where he died in 1910 at the age of eighty-nine, and is buried in Hingham Cemetery in Hingham, Plymouth County, Massachusetts. He was never married. In artist Samuel Isham's opinion, Gay did not achieve the measure of fame he deserved, maintaining that his paintings were characterized by "simplicity and truth".

== Sources ==
- Malone (1932). Dictionary of American biography. Vol. VII.
  New York: Charles Scribner's Sons.
- Johnson, Rossiter, ed. (1906). Biographical dictionary of America. Vol. IV. Boston, American Biographical Society. Rossiter (ed.), 1906, v. 4 (no page numbers, alphabetically listed)
- "Winckworth Allan Gay (1821-1910)". White Mountain Art & Artists. 1999–2022.
- Art, Archives of American. "Summary of the [Sketchbook] [graphic] / Winkworth Allan Gay, 1846 - Archives of American Art, Smithsonian Institution". Archives of American Art, Smithsonian Institution.
- "Winckworth Allan Gay [Biographical Notes]". Quest Royal Fine Art.
- "Winckworth Allan Gay". Questroyal Fine Art.
- "Winckworth Allan Gay". American Art News. 8 (20): 4. February 26, 1926. JSTOR 25590566.
- American Federation of Arts (1911). American Art Annual. MacMillan Company. p. 398.
- "Defining a Nation: Paintings of nineteenth Century America" (PDF). Vose Galleries of Boston.
