= Federico Gay =

Federico Gay may refer to:

- Federico Gay (cyclist) (born 1896), Italian road bicycle racer
- Federico Gay (footballer) (born 1991), Argentine defender
