= John Gayer =

John Gayer or Gayre may refer to:

- John Gayer (MP) (died 1571), English lawyer and MP
- John Gayer (Lord Mayor of London) (c. 1584–1639), English merchant, lord mayor of London in 1646
- Sir John Gayer (governor of Bombay) (died 1611), English governor of Bombay for the East India Company, nephew of the above

== See also ==
- John Gay (disambiguation)
