= Richard Gay =

Richard Gay may refer to:

- Richard Gay (MP for Portsmouth), Member of Parliament (MP) for Portsmouth,1388
- Richard Gay (MP for Bath) (died 1641), MP for Bath
- Richard Gay (rugby league) (born 1969), English rugby league footballer
- Richard Gay (skier) (born 1971), French Olympic freestyle skier
- Richard Gay (field hockey), Welsh field hockey player
