= Bill Gay =

American football player (1927–2008)

Billy Gay
No. 40
- Position: Defensive back

Personal information
- Born: November 12, 1927; Chicago, Illinois, U.S.
- Died: April 8, 2008 (aged 80); Chicago, Illinois, U.S.
- Listed height: 5 ft 11 in (1.80 m)
- Listed weight: 180 lb (82 kg)

Career information
- High school: Tilden (Chicago)
- College: Notre Dame
- NFL draft: 1950: 7th round, 85th overall pick

Career history
- Chicago Cardinals (1951)

Awards and highlights
- 2× National championship (1947, 1949)
- Stats at Pro Football Reference

William Theodore Gay (November 12, 1927 – August 8, 2008) was an American professional football player who was a defensive back for one season for the Chicago Cardinals.
