= Geneva Gay =

American educationalist

Geneva Gay is an American academic and author. She is an emerita professor at the University of Washington-Seattle.

== Biography ==
Gay is a consultant for the Teaching Diverse Students initiative through Learning For Justice, a project of the Southern Poverty Law Center. In 1994, Gay was the first recipient of The G. Pritchy Smith Multicultural Educator Award given by the National Association for Multicultural Education.

The American Educational Research Association awarded Gay the Distinguished Scholar Award in 1990.

== Selected publications ==
- Gay, Geneva (1994). At the Essence of Learning: Multicultural Education. Kappa Delta Pi.
- Gay, Geneva (2000). Culturally Responsive Teaching: Theory, Research, and Practice. Teachers College Press. ISBN 9780807750780. 2nd ed., 2010; 3rd ed., 2018.
- Gay, Geneva, ed. (2003). Becoming Multicultural Educators: Personal Journey Toward Professional Agency. Wiley. ISBN 978-0-7879-6514-3.
- Gay, Geneva; Baber, Willie L., eds. (1987). Expressively Black : the cultural basis of ethnic identity. New York: Praeger. ISBN 978-0275924652.

== See also ==
- Atwater, Mary M. (26 August 2010). "Dr. Geneva Gay: Multicultural Education for All Disciplines". Science Activities. 47 (4): 160–162. doi:10.1080/00368121003753902. ISSN 0036-8121. S2CID 143743447.
